= List of cities, towns and villages in Semnan province =

A list of cities, towns and villages in Semnan Province of north-eastern Iran:

== Alphabetical ==
Cities are in bold text; all others are villages.

=== A ===
Abarsij | Abbas Aba | Abbasabad | Abdal Samad | Abdia | Abdolabad | Abdollahabad | Abdollahabad | Abdollahabad-e Bala | Abeh-ye Now | Abirabad | Abkhvor | Abr | Abu ol Baq | Abu ol Hasani | Aftar | Agareh | Ahmadabad | Ahmadabad | Ahvanu | Ajarfajar Factory | Ala Industrial Zone | Ala | Ali Akbar Farm Company | Ali Kahi | Aliabad Industrial Estate | Aliabad | Aliabad | Aliabad | Aliabad-e Motalleb Khan | Alian | Allahabad | Aluak | Aminabad | Amirabad | Amiriyeh | Amiriyeh | Amravan | Aradan | Ardian | Armian | Artat | Arvaneh | Asad Aba | Asaran | Asb Keshan | Asr Mohammad Garrison | Astan | Avazabad | Azhgui

=== B ===
Badeleh Kuh | Baghcheh | Baghestan | Bahaabad | Bakhshabad | Bakran | Baq | Barkiyan | Barm | Bastam | Bedasht | Beheshtabad | Behvard | Beyarjomand | Bidestan | Biyabanak | Bon-e Kuh | Brickworks

=== C ===
Chahar Qeshlaq | Chahar Taq-e Bala | Chah-e Deh-e Inach | Chah-e Farsh | Chah-e Shirin | Chandab | Chashm | Cheshmeh Nadi | Cheshmeh Sefid | Cheshmeh Sefid | Cheshmeh-ye Sarhang | Cooperative Farm 1 | Cooperative Farm 2

=== D ===
Damghan | Damghan Jujeh Poultry Company | Darband | Darjazin | Darvar | Dasht Gonbad | Dasht-e Bu | Dasht-e Sefid | Dasht-e Shad | Dastjerd | Davarabad | Deh Kheyr | Deh Khoda | Deh Namak | Deh Soltan | Deh Sufian | Deh-e Qazi | Dehmolla | Dehraviyeh Poultry Company | Delazian | Deraz Ab | Dez Gereh-ye Afshar-e Pain | Dezian | Dibaj | Dizaj | Dowlatabad | Dowlatabad | Dowlatabad | Dowzahir | Duruan

=== E ===
Ebrahimabad-e Olya | Ebrahimabad-e Sofla | Emamabad | Emamzadeh Abdollah | Emamzadeh Abdollah | Emamzadeh Ali Akbar | Emamzadeh Esmail | Emamzadeh Zualfaqar | Eqbaliyeh | Eshqevan | Estar Khu | Estarband | Eyvanki | Eyvanki Industrial Estate

=== F ===
Fajr Industrial Estate | Fakhrabad | Fand | Farahabad | Faravan | Faridar | Farinu-ye Bala | Farvar | Fenesk | Firuzabad | Firuzabad | Firuzabad-e Bala | Firuzabad-e Pain | Forat | Forumad | Fulad Mahalleh

=== G ===
Garmab-e Bala | Garmab-e Pain | Garmsar | Gazeh | German | Ghaniabad | Ghazazan | Givar | Golestan | Gondeh Poli | Gorji

=== H ===
Haddadeh | Hajjaj | Hajjaji | Hajjiabad Industrial Estate | Hajjiabad-e Atashgah | Hajjiabad-e Bostijian | Hajjiabad-e Khvoriad | Hajjiabad-e Razveh | Hamidiyeh | Hamyard | Haq ol Khvajeh | Hasanabad | Hasanabad | Hashtabad | Hemmatabad | Heydarabad | Hiku | Hoseynabad Pol-e Abrish | Hoseynabad | Hoseynabad-e Dula | Hoseynabad-e Hajji Ali Naqi | Hoseynabad-e Kalpu | Hoseynabad-e Kordha | Hoseynabad-e Koru | Hoseynabad-e Saghar | Hoseynabad-e Zandeh | Hoseynan | Hunestan

=== I ===
Ich | Industrial Estate | Industrial Park

=== J ===
Jafarabad | Jafarabad | Jahanabad | Jalilabad | Jam | Jamaran Agro-Industry Company | Jannatabad Industrial Estate | Jannatabad | Jazan | Jehad Rural Industrial Company | Jilan | Jovin | Judaneh

=== K ===
Kahak | Kalagh Zili | Kalateh Khij | Kalateh Rudbar | Kalateh-ye Abdol | Kalateh-ye Asad | Kalateh-ye Khan | Kalateh-ye Mir Al | Kalateh-ye Molla | Kalateh-ye Molla | Kalateh-ye Motahhari | Kalateh-ye Rey | Kalateh-ye Sadat-e Bala | Kalateh-ye Sadat-e Pain | Kamardar | Kand-e Qoli Khan | Karand | Kardovan | Kariz | Kavard | Kela | Kelu | Khan Khvodi | Khaneh Goli | Khatirkuh | Kheyrabad | Khij | Khurian | Khurzan | Kohanabad | Kohanabad | Kolamu | Kolim | Korak | Korang | Kordabad | Korus-e Bala | Kowhan | Kuh Zar | Kushk-e Arbabi | Kushk-e Khaleseh-ye Bala | Kushk-e Khaleseh-ye Pain

=== L ===
Lajran | Lasjerd | Lerd

=== M ===
Mabad | Mahallah Bagh-e Hajj Sadeq | Mahallah Bagh-e Jadid | Mahmudabad | Mahmudabad-e Mowquf | Malijan-e Bala | Malijan-e Pain | Mandulak | Marri | Mart-e Haq Ali | Masihabad | Masumabad | Mayan | Mazaj | Mazraeh-ye Amirabad | Mazraeh-ye Labrud | Mazraeh-ye Mishi | Mazraeh-ye Sar Avar | Mazraeh-ye Shariat Panahi | Mazraeh-ye Siah Lak | Mehdiabad | Mehdiabad | Mehdiabad | Mehman Duyeh | Mehmandust | Meyami | Mianabad | Military Base | Miqan | Mirhajj | Moalleman | Moghan | Mohammadabad Pol-e Abrisham | Mohammadabad | Mohammadabad | Mohammadabad | Moinabad | Mojen | Molla Deh | Moradabad | Mowmenabad | Mowmenabad

=== N ===
Nahar | Naimabad | Namadmal | Namakeh | Nam-e Nik | Nardin | Narkan | Naruheh | Negarman | Nezami | Nova | Now Hesar | Nowdeh-e Arbabi | Nowdeh-e Khaleseh | Nowveh | Nukeh | Nur

=== P ===
Pa Deh | Pa Qaleh | Panj Hezari | Peru | Portaladasht Lary Cooperative | Poultry Company | Poultry Cooperative Number 7 | Puyeh

=== Q ===
Qaderabad | Qaderabad | Qahej-e Bala | Qahej-e Pain | Qaleh Abdollah | Qaleh Chek | Qaleh Hajji | Qaleh Kharabeh | Qaleh Now-e Khaleseh | Qaleh Now-e Kharaqan | Qaleh-ye Ahmad | Qaleh-ye Akbarabad | Qaleh-ye Aqa | Qaleh-ye Azodi | Qaleh-ye Bala Baram | Qaleh-ye Bala | Qaleh-ye Mirza Soleyman | Qaleh-ye Mohammad Aqa | Qaleh-ye Pain Baram | Qaleh-ye Seddiq | Qaleh-ye Showkat | Qali Baf | Qasemabad | Qasemabad-e Khanlar Khan | Qatul | Qeshlaq-e Aqa Esmail | Qeshlaq-e Nafar | Qodratabad | Qods | Qowsheh Degarman | Qusheh

=== R ===
Rahanjan | Railway Station | Ramazan Poultry Cooperative Number 4 | Rameh-ye Bala | Rameh-ye Pain | Rashm | Rasul Akram Scientific Centre | Raziabad | Reshmeh | Reyabad | Rezaabad | Rezvan | Rikan | Riz Poultry Company | Robat-e Zang | Roknabad | Rostamabad | Rudbar | Rudbarak-e Bala | Rudbarak-e Pain | Rumenan | Ruyan

=== S ===
Saba Poultry Company | Sadabad | Sadabad | Sah | Salam Rud | Salehabad | Salehabad | Salehabadu | Salmabad | Salman | Sangab | Sar Takht | Sartangeh | Saruzan-e Pain | Satveh | Sazaman-e Reza Ajdadi | Sazaman-e Saidi va Sherka | Sefid Shomareh Yek Meat Company | Seh Barar | Semnan New Poultry Cooperative | Semnan Slaughterhouse Company | Semnan | Seyang | Seydabad | Seyyed Abadu | Seyyedabad | Shah Bolagh-e Bala | Shah Sefid | Shahmirzad | Shahrak-e Afaghaneh | Shahrasazi Tazareh | Shahrud Cement Company | Shahrud Industrial Estate | Shahrud Integrated Farming Company | Shahrud | Shaman | Sharafabad | Sharifabad | Sharifiyeh | Sheli | Sherkat-e Nikan Namak | Shimi | Shir Ashian | Shur Qazi | Siah Pareh | Sobhan | Sodium Carbonate Company | Solhabad | Sorkh Deh | Sorkheh | Sudaghlan | Sufiabad | Susan Var

=== T ===
Taghmar | Tajur | Talajim | Talkhab | Tall | Talvin | Taq | Taqiabad | Tash-e Olya | Tash-e Sofla | Tazareh | Torud | Towchal | Tuchah | Tuyeh | Tuyeh

=== V ===
Vamarzan | Vashyeng Agricultural Company | Verkian

=== Y ===
Yateri-ye Bala | Yateri-ye Pain | Yazdanabad | Yazdu | Yunesabad

=== Z ===
Zamanabad | Zargar | Zargarabad | Zarki | Zarrinabad | Zereshkuh | Zivar |
