= 2010 Damghan earthquake =

Earthquake in Iran

- Location within Iran
- UTC time: 2010-08-27 19:23:49
- ISC event: 15131413
- USGS-ANSS: ComCat
- Local date: August 27, 2010
- Local time: 11:53:49
- Magnitude: 5.8 M_{w}
- Depth: 16.5 km (10.3 mi)
- Epicenter: 35.53°N 54.51°E
- Type: Strike-slip
- Areas affected: Semnan Province, Iran
- Max. intensity: MMI VII (Very strong)
- Peak acceleration: 0.55 g
- Casualties: 4 dead, 40 injured, 800 displaced

The 2010 Damghan earthquake (also known as the Kuh-Zar earthquake) occurred in northern Iran at 11:53:49 local time on August 27 with a moment magnitude of 5.8 and maximum Mercalli intensity of VII (Very strong). This strike-slip event damaged and destroyed a number of small villages in a sparsely populated region near the Alborz mountain range. It left four people dead, 40 injured, and about 800 without homes. The deaths and injuries in this moderate event were attributed to the low-quality construction styles that are typical of the area. The Iranian Strong Motion Network provided data by which seismologists determined the type and extent of the slip as well as the peak ground acceleration. Other large and destructive earthquakes have affected Semnan Province, including several events in 856 AD and 1953.

== Tectonic setting ==
The tectonics of Iran are dominated by the continental collision of the Arabian and Eurasian plates. The rate of convergence has been estimated at two centimeters per year for the past 10 million years; about half of that occurs across the Zagros fold and thrust belt. The northern Iran region near the Alborz mountains contains numerous reverse and left-lateral strike-slip faults that lie to the south of the Caspian Sea. The Astaneh strike-slip fault was a likely source of the 856 Damghan earthquake that caused the largest loss of life in the history of Iran—more than 200,000 deaths. A more recent damaging event that also occurred near the Alborz mountain range was the 1953 Torud earthquake, in which more than 900 perished.

== Earthquake ==
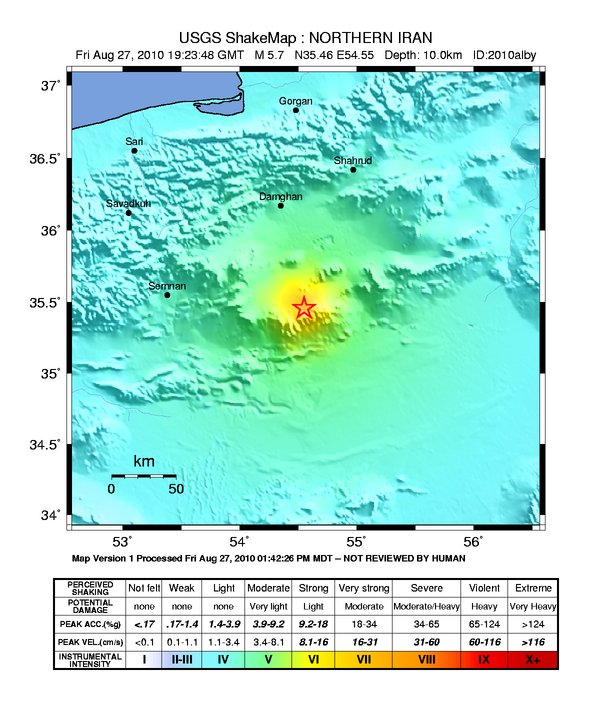
USGS ShakeMap for the event

Similar to the 1953 Torud earthquake, the 2010 Damghan event took place in a rural area that exposed relatively few villages to strong shaking. It occurred at 11:53 local time in the north-central desert region of Iran on a fault that dipped 78° to the northwest. Fault motion occurred on a NE–SW striking fault that was almost pure left-lateral strike-slip. A Mercalli intensity of VII (Very strong) was observed in Kuh Zar and the nearby villages of Tuchahi, Kelu, and Shimi. In Hoseynian, Moalleman, Satveh, and Torud, the intensity was VI (Strong). Some surface cracks and fissures were present near Tuchahi and Kelu villages, but no significant surface faulting occurred.

=== Damage ===
The affected area has a low population density and has an abundance of homes that are constructed with local clay material by unskilled workers. The unreinforced stone masonry or adobe homes are sometimes overloaded single story structures with flat wooden roofs with steel beams. Most of these types of homes suffered partial collapse and led to a number of roof collapses. Fifty homes were destroyed, 300 were damaged, including a roof cave-in that left two women dead. Overall, seven villages sustained damage and twelve were destroyed. Four people died, 40 were injured, and 800 were left homeless, but no major infrastructure (dams, bridges, or power stations) were impacted.

=== Strong motion ===
The first isoseismal map that was created in Iran was for the earlier 1953 Torud event. To focus on the association between the macroseismic effects and the instrumental intensity for the 2010 event, seismologists Mohammad P. Shahvar and Mehdi Zaré conducted a field investigation and interviews. An isoseismal map that was created using the data aligned with a ShakeMap that was created by the Tehran-based International Institute of Earthquake Engineering and Seismology. The closest strong motion station was about 7 kilometers (4.3 mi) to the east of the origin of faulting and showed a horizontal acceleration of 0.55 g. The peak ground acceleration and peak ground velocity that were attained from the Iranian Strong Motion Network were considered high for a moderate event.

== Aftermath ==
Seventy rescue personnel and ambulances arrived at Kuh Zar. People with minor injuries were treated by paramedics and discharged; others were taken to Damghan Hospital. Interior Minister, Mostafa Mohammad-Najjar, along with other government officials and members of the Iranian Red Crescent Society (IRCS), visited Kuh Zar the following day. A temporary camp with 50 tents was established in the village. Food, beds and other necessary items were supplied to the village by the IRCS.

== See also ==
- List of earthquakes in 2010
- List of earthquakes in Iran
