= Mandulak =

Mandulak مندولک
- Village
- Location within Iran
- Coordinates: 35°09′57″N 52°22′31″E
- Country: Iran
- Province: Semnan
- County: Garmsar
- Bakhsh: Central
- Rural District: Howmeh

Population (2006)
  - Total: 14
- Time zone: UTC+3:30 (IRST)
  - Summer (DST): UTC+4:30 (IRDT)

Mandulak (Persian: مندولک, also Romanized as Mandūlak; also known as Mandūlak-e Pā’īn) is a village in Howmeh Rural District, Central District, Garmsar County, Semnan Province, Iran. At the 2006 census, its population was 14, in 5 families.
