= Emamzadeh Esmail, Semnan =

Emamzadeh Esmail امامزاده اسماعيل
- Village
- Location within Iran
- Coordinates: 35°13′13″N 52°18′32″E
- Country: Iran
- Province: Semnan
- County: Garmsar
- Bakhsh: Central
- Rural District: Lajran

Population (2006)
  - Total: 28
- Time zone: UTC+3:30 (IRST)
  - Summer (DST): UTC+4:30 (IRDT)

Emamzadeh Esmail (Persian: امامزاده اسماعيل, also Romanized as Emāmzādeh Esmā‘īl) is a village in Lajran Rural District, in the Central District of Garmsar County, Semnan Province, Iran. At the 2006 census, its population was 28, in 4 families.
