= Hoseynabad-e Zandeh =

Hoseynabad-e Zandeh حسين ابادزنده
- Village
- Location within Iran
- Coordinates: 36°33′28″N 55°02′10″E
- Country: Iran
- Province: Semnan
- County: Shahrud
- Bakhsh: Bastam
- Rural District: Kharqan

Population (2006)
  - Total: 455
- Time zone: UTC+3:30 (IRST)
  - Summer (DST): UTC+4:30 (IRDT)

Hoseynabad-e Zandeh (Persian: حسين ابادزنده, also Romanized as Ḩoseynābād-e Zandeh; also known as Ḩoseynābād) is a village in Kharqan Rural District, Bastam District, Shahrud County, Semnan Province, Iran. At the 2006 census, its population was 455, in 129 families.
