= Deh-e Qazi, Damghan =

Deh-e Qazi ده قاضي
- Village
- Location within Iran
- Coordinates: 35°59′16″N 54°17′12″E
- Country: Iran
- Province: Semnan
- County: Damghan
- Bakhsh: Amirabad
- Rural District: Qohab-e Rastaq

Population (2006)
  - Total: 13
- Time zone: UTC+3:30 (IRST)
  - Summer (DST): UTC+4:30 (IRDT)

Deh-e Qazi (Persian: ده قاضي, also Romanized as Deh-e Qāẕī) is a village in Qohab-e Rastaq Rural District, Amirabad District, Damghan County, Semnan Province, Iran. At the 2006 census, its population was 13, in 5 families.
