= Mart-e Haq Ali =

Mart-e Haq Ali مرتع حق علي
- Village
- Location within Iran
- Coordinates: 36°36′36″N 54°40′42″E
- Country: Iran
- Province: Semnan
- County: Shahrud
- Bakhsh: Bastam
- Rural District: Kharqan

Population (2006)
  - Total: 32
- Time zone: UTC+3:30 (IRST)
  - Summer (DST): UTC+4:30 (IRDT)

Mart-e Haq Ali (Persian: مرتع حق علي, also Romanized as Mart-e Ḩaq ‘Alī; also known as Ḩaq ‘Alī and Ḩaqq ‘Alī) is a village in Kharqan Rural District, Bastam District, Shahrud County, Semnan Province, Iran. At the 2006 census, its population was 32, in 8 families.
