= Qeshlaq-e Nafar =

Qeshlaq-e Nafar قشلاق نفر
- Village
- Location within Iran
- Coordinates: 35°12′41″N 52°24′16″E
- Country: Iran
- Province: Semnan
- County: Garmsar
- Bakhsh: Central
- Rural District: Howmeh

Population (2006)
  - Total: 147
- Time zone: UTC+3:30 (IRST)
  - Summer (DST): UTC+4:30 (IRDT)

Qeshlaq-e Nafar (Persian: قشلاق نفر, also Romanized as Qeshlāq-e Nafar) is a village in Howmeh Rural District, in the Central District of Garmsar County, Semnan Province, Iran. At the 2006 census, its population was 147, in 43 families.
