= Sadabad, Garmsar =

Sadabad سعد آباد
- Village
- Location within Iran
- Coordinates: 35°08′55″N 52°24′56″E
- Country: Iran
- Province: Semnan
- County: Garmsar
- Bakhsh: Central
- Rural District: Howmeh

Population (2006)
  - Total: 57
- Time zone: UTC+3:30 (IRST)
  - Summer (DST): UTC+4:30 (IRDT)

Sadabad (Persian: سعد آباد, also Romanized as Sa‘dābād) is a village in Howmeh Rural District, in the Central District of Garmsar County, Semnan Province, Iran. At the 2006 census, its population was 57, in 18 families.
