= Peru, Iran =

Peru پرو
- village
- Location within Iran
- Coordinates: 36°36′07″N 55°06′01″E
- Country: Iran
- Province: Semnan
- County: Shahrud
- Bakhsh: Bastam
- Rural District: Kharqan

Population (2006)
  - Total: 2,171
- Time zone: UTC+3:30 (IRST)
  - Summer (DST): UTC+4:30 (IRDT)
- Area code: Circa

Peru (Persian: پرو, also Romanized as Perū, Paru, and Poroo) is a village in Kharqan Rural District, Bastam District, Shahrud County, Semnan Province, Iran. At the 2006 census, its population was 2,171, in 606 families. It is less known due to the village namesake is similar to South American country Peru.
