= Salman, Semnan =

Salman سلمان
- Village
- Location within Iran
- Coordinates: 35°10′52″N 52°25′54″E
- Country: Iran
- Province: Semnan
- County: Garmsar
- Bakhsh: Central
- Rural District: Howmeh

Population (2006)
  - Total: 150
- Time zone: UTC+3:30 (IRST)
  - Summer (DST): UTC+4:30 (IRDT)

Salman (Persian: سلمان, also Romanized as Salmān) is a village in Howmeh Rural District, in the Central District of Garmsar County, Semnan Province, Iran. At the 2006 census, its population was 150, in 42 families.
