= Qasemabad-e Khanlar Khan =

Qasemabad-e Khanlar Khan قاسم ابادخانلرخان
- Village
- Location within Iran
- Coordinates: 36°35′56″N 55°04′48″E
- Country: Iran
- Province: Semnan
- County: Shahrud
- Bakhsh: Bastam
- Rural District: Kharqan

Population (2006)
  - Total: 398
- Time zone: UTC+3:30 (IRST)
  - Summer (DST): UTC+4:30 (IRDT)

Qasemabad-e Khanlar Khan (Persian: قاسم ابادخانلرخان, also Romanized as Qāsemābād-e Khānlar Khān) is a village in Kharqan Rural District, Bastam District, Shahrud County, Semnan Province, Iran. At the 2006 census, its population was 398, in 118 families.
