= Kushk-e Arbabi =

Kushk-e Arbabi كوشك اربابي
- Village
- Location within Iran
- Coordinates: 35°11′32″N 52°21′24″E
- Country: Iran
- Province: Semnan
- County: Garmsar
- Bakhsh: Central
- Rural District: Lajran

Population (2006)
  - Total: 76
- Time zone: UTC+3:30 (IRST)
  - Summer (DST): UTC+4:30 (IRDT)

Kushk-e Arbabi (Persian: كوشك اربابي, also Romanized as Kūshk-e Arbābī) is a village in Lajran Rural District, in the Central District of Garmsar County, Semnan Province, Iran. At the 2006 census, its population was 76, in 21 families.
