= Seh Barar =

Seh Barar سه برار
- Village
- Location within Iran
- Coordinates: 35°12′54″N 52°22′10″E
- Country: Iran
- Province: Semnan
- County: Garmsar
- Bakhsh: Central
- Rural District: Lajran

Population (2006)
  - Total: 131
- Time zone: UTC+3:30 (IRST)
  - Summer (DST): UTC+4:30 (IRDT)

Seh Barar (Persian: سه برار, also Romanized as Seh Barār; also known as Seh Barādar) is a village in Lajran Rural District, in the Central District of Garmsar County, Semnan Province, Iran. At the 2006 census, its population was 131, in 39 families.
