= Abeh-ye Now =

Abeh-ye Now ابه نو
- Village
- Country: Iran
- Province: Semnan
- County: Garmsar
- Bakhsh: Central
- Rural District: Lajran

Population (2006)
  - Total: 65
- Time zone: UTC+3:30 (IRST)
  - Summer (DST): UTC+4:30 (IRDT)

Abeh-ye Now (Persian: ابه نو, also Romanized as Ābeh-ye Now) is a village in Lajran Rural District, in the Central District of Garmsar County, Semnan Province, Iran. At the 2006 census, its population was 65, in 10 families.
