= Bon-e Kuh, Semnan =

Bon-e Kuh بنكوه
- Village
- Location within Iran
- Coordinates: 35°17′00″N 52°24′00″E
- Country: Iran
- Province: Semnan
- County: Garmsar
- Bakhsh: Central
- Rural District: Lajran

Population (2006)
  - Total: 20
- Time zone: UTC+3:30 (IRST)
  - Summer (DST): UTC+4:30 (IRDT)

Bon-e Kuh (Persian: بنكوه, also Romanized as Bon-e Kūh, Bonkūh, and Bun-i-Kūh; also known as Boneh Kūh) is a village in Lajran Rural District, in the Central District of Garmsar County, Semnan Province, Iran. At the 2006 census, its population was 20, in 7 families.
