= Deh Kheyr, Semnan =

Deh Kheyr ده خير
- Village
- Location within Iran
- Coordinates: 36°32′08″N 54°58′55″E
- Country: Iran
- Province: Semnan
- County: Shahrud
- Bakhsh: Bastam
- Rural District: Kharqan

Population (2006)
  - Total: 182
- Time zone: UTC+3:30 (IRST)
  - Summer (DST): UTC+4:30 (IRDT)

Deh Kheyr (Persian: ده خير; also known as Dakhi) is a village in Kharqan Rural District, Bastam District, Shahrud County, Semnan province, Iran. At the 2006 census, its population was 182, in 39 families.

It is located in Shahrud Plain, about 4 km (2.5 mi) north of Bastam, and 15 kilometers (9.3 mi) from the city of Shahrud.

== Archaeology ==
In 2006, traces of a prehistoric, 8,000-year-old settlements were found here. The discoveries included ovens, craft workshops, and other evidence of settlements.

Archeological excavations in different parts of Shahrud Plain indicate the existence of villages in this area during 7-5 millennium BC.

== Sang-i Chakmak ==
Sang-i Chakmak (Tappeh Sang-e Chakhmaq, Sange Chaxmaq, Chakhmagh) is the most famous Neolithic site of Shahrud plain. It is located only 4 km (2.5 mi) from Deh Kheyr, and was excavated by Japanese archaeologist, Masuda, in 1972–1973.

The Sang-e Chakhmaq West Mound is believed to be the earliest known settlement of the Neolithic in the north-east region of Iran, dating to the late eighth to early seventh millennium BC.

Levels 2-5 represent the aceramic Neolithic phase. Large mud-brick houses with plastered floors were built. There's also some imported obsidian. There are many zoomorphic and anthropomorphic figurines.

In the uppermost levels, a handful of sherds indicate the beginning of the Early Ceramic Neolithic. The date is about 6000 BC. There are many parallels with Jeitun culture sites.

Also, in Semnan Province, there is an important site of Tepe Hissar.
