= Masumabad, Semnan =

Masumabad معصوم اباد
- Village
- Location within Iran
- Coordinates: 36°01′00″N 54°16′40″E
- Country: Iran
- Province: Semnan
- County: Damghan
- Bakhsh: Amirabad
- Rural District: Qohab-e Rastaq

Population (2006)
  - Total: 20
- Time zone: UTC+3:30 (IRST)
  - Summer (DST): UTC+4:30 (IRDT)

Masumabad (Persian: معصوم اباد, also Romanized as Ma‘şūmābād) is a village in Qohab-e Rastaq Rural District, Amirabad District, Damghan County, Semnan Province, Iran. At the 2006 census, its population was 20, in 9 families.
