= Sobhan, Iran =

Sobhan سبحان
- Village
- Location within Iran
- Coordinates: 36°02′48″N 54°14′11″E
- Country: Iran
- Province: Semnan
- County: Damghan
- Bakhsh: Amirabad
- Rural District: Qohab-e Rastaq

Population (2006)
  - Total: 32
- Time zone: UTC+3:30 (IRST)
  - Summer (DST): UTC+4:30 (IRDT)

Sobhan (Persian: سبحان, also Romanized as Sobḩān; also known as Sobḩānābād) is a village in Qohab-e Rastaq Rural District, Amirabad District, Damghan County, Semnan Province, Iran. At the 2006 census, its population was 32, in 12 families.
