= Kela, Semnan =

Kela كلا
- Village
- Location within Iran
- Coordinates: 36°02′54″N 54°19′56″E
- Country: Iran
- Province: Semnan
- County: Damghan
- Bakhsh: Amirabad
- Rural District: Qohab-e Rastaq

Population (2006)
  - Total: 127
- Time zone: UTC+3:30 (IRST)
  - Summer (DST): UTC+4:30 (IRDT)

Kela (Persian: كلا, also Romanized as Kelā and Kalā) is a village in Qohab-e Rastaq Rural District, Amirabad District, Damghan County, Semnan Province, Iran. At the 2006 census, its population was 127, in 41 families.
