= Tash-e Sofla =

Tash-e Sofla تاش سفلي
- Village
- Location within Iran
- Coordinates: 36°33′32″N 54°40′30″E
- Country: Iran
- Province: Semnan
- County: Shahrud
- Bakhsh: Bastam
- Rural District: Kharqan

Population (2006)
  - Total: 149
- Time zone: UTC+3:30 (IRST)
  - Summer (DST): UTC+4:30 (IRDT)

Tash-e Sofla (Persian: تاش سفلي, also Romanized as Tāsh-e Soflá; also known as Tāsh-e Pā’īn) is a village in Kharqan Rural District, Bastam District, Shahrud County, Semnan Province, Iran. At the 2006 census, its population was 149, in 41 families.
