= Mahmudabad-e Mowquf =

Mahmudabad-e Mowquf محمود آباد موقوف
- Village
- Location within Iran
- Coordinates: 35°10′58″N 52°26′20″E
- Country: Iran
- Province: Semnan
- County: Garmsar
- Bakhsh: Central
- Rural District: Howmeh

Population (2006)
  - Total: 32
- Time zone: UTC+3:30 (IRST)
  - Summer (DST): UTC+4:30 (IRDT)

Mahmudabad-e Mowquf (Persian: محمود آباد موقوف, also Romanized as Maḩmūdābād-e Mowqūf; also known as Maḩmūdābād-e Mowqūfeh) is a village in Howmeh Rural District, in the Central District of Garmsar County, Semnan Province, Iran. At the 2006 census, its population was 32, in 11 families.
