= Tash-e Olya =

Tash-e Olya تاش عليا
- Village
- Location within Iran
- Coordinates: 36°33′57″N 54°40′47″E
- Country: Iran
- Province: Semnan
- County: Shahrud
- Bakhsh: Bastam
- Rural District: Kharqan

Population (2006)
  - Total: 138
- Time zone: UTC+3:30 (IRST)
  - Summer (DST): UTC+4:30 (IRDT)

Tash-e Olya (Persian: تاش عليا, also Romanized as Tāsh-e ‘Olyā; also known as Tāsh and Tāsh-e Bālā) is a village in Kharqan Rural District, Bastam District, Shahrud County, Semnan Province, Iran. At the 2006 census, its population was 138, in 40 families.
