= Gorji, Semnan =

Gorji گرجي
- Village
- Location within Iran
- Coordinates: 36°29′10″N 55°03′13″E
- Country: Iran
- Province: Semnan
- County: Shahrud
- Bakhsh: Bastam
- Rural District: Kharqan

Population (2006)
  - Total: 196
- Time zone: UTC+3:30 (IRST)
  - Summer (DST): UTC+4:30 (IRDT)

Gorji (Persian: گرجي, also Romanized as Gorjī) is a village in Kharqan Rural District, Bastam District, Shahrud County, Semnan Province, Iran. At the 2006 census, its population was 196, in 48 families.
