= Namadmal =

Namadmal نمدمال
- Village
- Location within Iran
- Coordinates: 36°35′25″N 55°03′19″E
- Country: Iran
- Province: Semnan
- County: Shahrud
- Bakhsh: Bastam
- Rural District: Kharqan

Population (2006)
  - Total: 244
- Time zone: UTC+3:30 (IRST)
  - Summer (DST): UTC+4:30 (IRDT)

Namadmal (Persian: نمدمال, also Romanized as Namadmāl) is a village in Kharqan Rural District, Bastam District, Shahrud County, Semnan Province, Iran. At the 2006 census, its population was 244, in 68 families.
