= Kushk-e Khaleseh =

Kushk-e Khaleseh (Persian: كوشك خالصه) may refer to:

- Kushk-e Khaleseh-ye Bala
- Kushk-e Khaleseh-ye Pain
