= Moinabad, Semnan =

Moinabad معين آباد
- Village
- Location within Iran
- Coordinates: 35°54′15″N 54°17′55″E
- Country: Iran
- Province: Semnan
- County: Damghan
- Bakhsh: Amirabad
- Rural District: Qohab-e Rastaq

Population (2006)
  - Total: 10
- Time zone: UTC+3:30 (IRST)
  - Summer (DST): UTC+4:30 (IRDT)

Moinabad (Persian: معين آباد, also Romanized as Mo‘īnābād) is a village in Qohab-e Rastaq Rural District, Amirabad District, Damghan County, Semnan Province, Iran. At the 2006 census, its population was 10, in 4 families.
