= Salmabad, Semnan =

Salmabad سلم اباد
- Village
- Location within Iran
- Coordinates: 35°26′05″N 54°34′43″E
- Country: Iran
- Province: Semnan
- County: Damghan
- Bakhsh: Amirabad
- Rural District: Qohab-e Rastaq

Population (2006)
  - Total: 53
- Time zone: UTC+3:30 (IRST)
  - Summer (DST): UTC+4:30 (IRDT)

Salmabad (Persian: سلم اباد, also Romanized as Salmābād) is a village in Qohab-e Rastaq Rural District, Amirabad District, Damghan County, Semnan Province, Iran. At the 2006 census, its population was 53, in 13 families.
