= German, Iran =

German گرمن
- Village
- Location within Iran
- Coordinates: 36°37′32″N 55°03′23″E
- Country: Iran
- Province: Semnan
- County: Shahrud
- Bakhsh: Bastam
- Rural District: Kharqan

Population (2006)
  - Total: 335
- Time zone: UTC+3:30 (IRST)

German (Persian: گرمن, also Romanized as Garman; also known as Gorgān, Kūrqān, and Qurghān) is a village in Kharqan Rural District, Bastam District, Shahrud County, Semnan Province, Iran. At the 2006 census, its population was 335, in 102 families.
