= Chahar Qeshlaq =

Chahar Qeshlaq چهارقشلاق
- Village
- Location within Iran
- Coordinates: 35°12′45″N 52°23′31″E
- Country: Iran
- Province: Semnan
- County: Garmsar
- Bakhsh: Central
- Rural District: Howmeh

Population (2006)
  - Total: 51
- Time zone: UTC+3:30 (IRST)
  - Summer (DST): UTC+4:30 (IRDT)

Chahar Qeshlaq (Persian: چهارقشلاق, also Romanized as Chahār Qeshlāq) is a village in Howmeh Rural District, in the Central District of Garmsar County, Semnan Province, Iran. At the 2006 census, its population was 51, in 16 families.
