= Naruheh =

Naruheh ناروهه
- Village
- Location within Iran
- Coordinates: 35°16′17″N 52°23′34″E
- Country: Iran
- Province: Semnan
- County: Garmsar
- Bakhsh: Central
- Rural District: Lajran

Population (2006)
  - Total: 16
- Time zone: UTC+3:30 (IRST)
  - Summer (DST): UTC+4:30 (IRDT)

Naruheh (Persian: ناروهه, also Romanized as Nārūheh; also known as Nārūneh) is a village in Lajran Rural District, in the Central District of Garmsar County, Semnan Province, Iran. At the 2006 census, its population was 16, in 4 families.
