= Qaleh-ye Mohammad Aqa =

Qaleh-ye Mohammad Aqa قلعه محمد آقا
- Village
- Location within Iran
- Coordinates: 36°37′25″N 55°03′00″E
- Country: Iran
- Province: Semnan
- County: Shahrud
- Bakhsh: Bastam
- Rural District: Kharqan

Population (2006)
  - Total: 182
- Time zone: UTC+3:30 (IRST)
  - Summer (DST): UTC+4:30 (IRDT)

Qaleh-ye Mohammad Aqa (Persian: قلعه محمد آقا, also Romanized as Qal‘eh-ye Moḩammad Āqā; also known as Kalāteh-ye Moḩammad Āqā) is a village in Kharqan Rural District, Bastam District, Shahrud County, Semnan Province, Iran. At the 2006 census, its population was 182, in 51 families.
