= Qahej =

Qahej (Persian: قهيج) may refer to:

- Qahej-e Bala, a village in Kharqan Rural District in Semnan Province, Iran
- Qahej-e Pain, a village in Kharqan Rural District, Semnan Province, Iran
