= Mahallah Bagh-e Jadid =

Mahallah Bagh-e Jadid محله باغ جديد
- Village
- Country: Iran
- Province: Semnan
- County: Garmsar
- Bakhsh: Central
- Rural District: Lajran

Population (2006)
  - Total: 163
- Time zone: UTC+3:30 (IRST)
  - Summer (DST): UTC+4:30 (IRDT)

Mahallah Bagh-e Jadid (Persian: محله باغ جديد, also Romanized as Maḩallah Bāgh-e Jadīd) is a village in Lajran Rural District, in the Central District of Garmsar County, Semnan Province, Iran. At the 2006 census, its population was 163, in 44 families.
