= Saruzan-e Pain =

Saruzan-e Pain ساروزن پايين
- Village
- Location within Iran
- Coordinates: 35°11′13″N 52°20′17″E
- Country: Iran
- Province: Semnan
- County: Garmsar
- Bakhsh: Central
- Rural District: Lajran

Population (2006)
  - Total: 24
- Time zone: UTC+3:30 (IRST)
  - Summer (DST): UTC+4:30 (IRDT)

Saruzan-e Pain (Persian: ساروزن پايين, also Romanized as Sārūzan-e Pā’īn and Sārūzan Pā’īn; also known as Sārzūn-e Pā’īn) is a village in Lajran Rural District, in the Central District of Garmsar County, Semnan Province, Iran. At the 2006 census, its population was 24 from 6 families.
