= Qaleh Abdollah, Semnan =

Qaleh Abdollah قلعه عبداله
- Village
- Location within Iran
- Coordinates: 36°36′26″N 55°05′02″E
- Country: Iran
- Province: Semnan
- County: Shahrud
- Bakhsh: Bastam
- Rural District: Kharqan

Population (2006)
  - Total: 116
- Time zone: UTC+3:30 (IRST)
  - Summer (DST): UTC+4:30 (IRDT)

Qaleh Abdollah (Persian: قلعه عبداله, also Romanized as Qal‘eh ‘Abdollāh) is a village in Kharqan Rural District, Bastam District, Shahrud County, Semnan Province, Iran. At the 2006 census, its population was 116, in 35 families.
