= Gondeh Poli =

Gondeh Poli گنده پلي
- Village
- Location within Iran
- Coordinates: 36°33′33″N 54°59′56″E
- Country: Iran
- Province: Semnan
- County: Shahrud
- Bakhsh: Bastam
- Rural District: Kharqan

Population (2006)
  - Total: 132
- Time zone: UTC+3:30 (IRST)
  - Summer (DST): UTC+4:30 (IRDT)

Gondeh Poli (Persian: گنده پلي, also Romanized as Gondeh Polī) is a village in Kharqan Rural District, Bastam District, Shahrud County, Semnan Province, Iran. At the 2006 census, its population was 132, in 32 families.
