= Kahak, Semnan =

Kahak کهک
- Village
- Location within Iran
- Coordinates: 35°08′35″N 52°19′53″E
- Country: Iran
- Province: Semnan
- County: Garmsar
- Bakhsh: Central
- Rural District: Howmeh

Population (2006)
  - Total: 26
- Time zone: UTC+3:30 (IRST)
  - Summer (DST): UTC+4:30 (IRDT)

Kahak (Persian: کهک) is a village in Howmeh Rural District, in the Central District of Garmsar County, Semnan Province, Iran. At the 2006 census, its population was 26, in 7 families.
