= Nova, Semnan =

Nova نوا
- Village
- Location within Iran
- Coordinates: 35°27′40″N 54°37′46″E
- Country: Iran
- Province: Semnan
- County: Damghan
- Bakhsh: Amirabad
- Rural District: Qohab-e Rastaq

Population (2006)
  - Total: 31
- Time zone: UTC+3:30 (IRST)
  - Summer (DST): UTC+4:30 (IRDT)

Nova (Persian: نوا, also romanized as Novā) is a village in Qohab-e Rastaq Rural District, Amirabad District, Damghan County, Semnan Province, Iran. In 2006, its population was 31, in 8 families.
