= Now Hesar =

Now Hesar نوحصار
- Village
- Location within Iran
- Coordinates: 35°12′13″N 52°22′13″E
- Country: Iran
- Province: Semnan
- County: Garmsar
- Bakhsh: Central
- Rural District: Lajran

Population (2006)
  - Total: 146
- Time zone: UTC+3:30 (IRST)
  - Summer (DST): UTC+4:30 (IRDT)

Now Hesar (Persian: نوحصار, also Romanized as Now Ḩeşār) is a village in Lajran Rural District, in the Central District of Garmsar County, Semnan Province, Iran. At the 2006 census, its population was 146, in 31 families.
