= Negarman =

Negarman نگارمن
- Village
- Location within Iran
- Coordinates: 36°32′04″N 54°50′27″E
- Country: Iran
- Province: Semnan
- County: Shahrud
- Bakhsh: Bastam
- Rural District: Kharqan

Population (2006)
  - Total: 69
- Time zone: UTC+3:30 (IRST)
  - Summer (DST): UTC+4:30 (IRDT)

Negarman (Persian: نگارمن, also Romanized as Negārman, Nekārman, Nigārman, Nogārīmān, Nogārman, and Nokārman) is a village in Kharqan Rural District, Bastam District, Shahrud County, Semnan Province, Iran. At the 2006 census, its population was 69, in 23 families.
