= Qaleh-ye Mirza Soleyman =

Qaleh-ye Mirza Soleyman قلعه ميرزاسليمان
- Village
- Location within Iran
- Coordinates: 36°35′24″N 55°06′33″E
- Country: Iran
- Province: Semnan
- County: Shahrud
- Bakhsh: Bastam
- Rural District: Kharqan

Population (2006)
  - Total: 415
- Time zone: UTC+3:30 (IRST)
  - Summer (DST): UTC+4:30 (IRDT)

Qaleh-ye Mirza Soleyman (Persian: قلعه ميرزاسليمان, also Romanized as Qal‘eh-ye Mīrzā Soleymān; also known as Qal‘eh-ye Soleymān Mīrzā) is a village in Kharqan Rural District, Bastam District, Shahrud County, Semnan Province, Iran. At the 2006 census, its population was 415, in 98 families.
