= Qeshlaq-e Aqa Esmail =

Qeshlaq-e Aqa Esmail قشلاق اقااسماعيل
- Village
- Country: Iran
- Province: Semnan
- County: Garmsar
- Bakhsh: Central
- Rural District: Howmeh

Population (2006)
  - Total: 17
- Time zone: UTC+3:30 (IRST)
  - Summer (DST): UTC+4:30 (IRDT)

Qeshlaq-e Aqa Esmail (Persian: قشلاق اقااسماعيل, also Romanized as Qeshlāq-e Āqā Esmāʿīl) is a village in Howmeh Rural District, in the Central District of Garmsar County, Semnan Province, Iran. At the 2006 census, its population was 17, in 6 families.
