= Susan Var =

Susan Var سوسن وار
- Village
- Location within Iran
- Coordinates: 35°17′24″N 54°32′56″E
- Country: Iran
- Province: Semnan
- County: Damghan
- Bakhsh: Amirabad
- Rural District: Qohab-e Rastaq

Population (2006)
  - Total: 18
- Time zone: UTC+3:30 (IRST)
  - Summer (DST): UTC+4:30 (IRDT)

Susan Var (Persian: سوسن وار, also Romanized as Sūsan Vār) is a village in Qohab-e Rastaq Rural District, Amirabad District, Damghan County, Semnan Province, Iran. At the 2006 census, its population was 18, in 4 families.
