= Rumenan =

Rumenan رومنان
- Village
- Location within Iran
- Coordinates: 36°00′08″N 54°14′38″E
- Country: Iran
- Province: Semnan
- County: Damghan
- Bakhsh: Amirabad
- Rural District: Qohab-e Rastaq

Population (2006)
  - Total: 14
- Time zone: UTC+3:30 (IRST)
  - Summer (DST): UTC+4:30 (IRDT)

Rumenan (Persian: رومنان, also Romanized as Rūmenān) is a village in Qohab-e Rastaq Rural District, Amirabad District, Damghan County, Semnan Province, Iran. At the 2006 census, its population was 14, in 5 families.
