= Malijan =

Malijan (Persian: مليجان) may refer to:

- Malijan-e Bala
- Malijan-e Pain
