= Sharafabad, Semnan =

Sharafabad شرف اباد
- Village
- Location within Iran
- Coordinates: 36°29′35″N 55°02′39″E
- Country: Iran
- Province: Semnan
- County: Shahrud
- Bakhsh: Bastam
- Rural District: Kharqan

Population (2006)
  - Total: 15
- Time zone: UTC+3:30 (IRST)
  - Summer (DST): UTC+4:30 (IRDT)

Sharafabad (Persian: شرف اباد, also Romanized as Sharafābād; also known as Sharīfābād) is a village in Kharqan Rural District, Bastam District, Shahrud County, Semnan Province, Iran. At the 2006 census, its population was 15, in 6 families.
