= Mehrnegar Castle =

Castle in Semnan Province, Iran

Mehrnegar castle
- قلعه مهرنگار
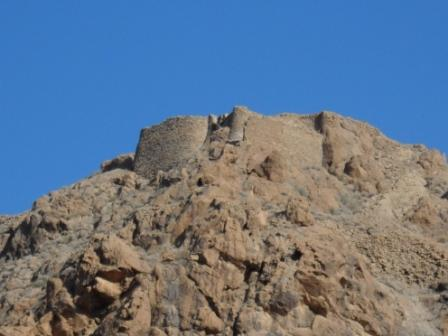
- Interactive map of the Mehrnegar castle area
- Former names: Mehrin (مهرین)

General information
- Type: Castle
- Location: Damghan County, Iran
- Coordinates: 36.2562°N 54.1529°E

Mehrnegar castle (Persian: قلعه مهرنگار) is a historical castle located in Damghan County in Semnan Province, The longevity of this fortress dates back to the Historical periods after Islam.
