= Keshan =

Keshan may refer to:

- Keshan County, in Heilongjiang, China
  - Keshan, Heilongjiang, seat of said county
- Keshan, Iraq
- Keşan, town in Eastern Thrace, Turkey
- Asb Keshan, village in Kharturan Rural District, Semnan, Iran
- Mordar Keshan, village in Central District, Khorasan, Iran
- Keshan disease, congestive cardiomyopathy caused by dietary deficiency in the mineral selenium

== See also ==
- Kashan
  - Kashan rug
- Qashan
