= Miqan, Semnan =

Village in Semnan province, Iran

Miqan Persian: ميقان
- Village
- Location within Iran
- Coordinates: 36°36′16″N 55°01′34″E
- Country: Iran
- Province: Semnan
- County: Shahrud
- District: Bastam
- Rural District: Kharqan

Population (2016)
  - Total: 4,264
- Time zone: UTC+3:30 (IRST)

Miqan (Persian: ميقان) (Note: Also romanized as Mīqān; also known as Meyghān and Mīghān) is a village in Kharqan Rural District (Note: Formerly Bastam Rural District) of Bastam District in Shahrud County, Semnan province, Iran.

== Demographics ==
=== Population ===
At the time of the 2006 National Census, the village's population was 2,207 in 587 households. The following census in 2011 counted 1,967 people in 645 households. The 2016 census measured the population of the village as 4,264 people in 1,461 households, the most populous in its rural district.
