= Kafar Castle =

Castle in Semnan Province, Iran

Kafar castle
- قلعه کافر

General information
- Type: Castle
- Location: Garmsar County, Iran

Kafar castle (Persian: قلعه کافر) is a historical castle located in Garmsar County in Semnan Province, The longevity of this fortress dates back to the Middle Ages and Late Historical Periods of Islam.
