= Nur, Semnan =

Nur نور
- Village
- Location within Iran
- Coordinates: 35°29′51″N 56°41′06″E
- Country: Iran
- Province: Semnan
- County: Shahrud
- Bakhsh: Beyarjomand
- Rural District: Kharturan

Population (2006)
  - Total: 92
- Time zone: UTC+3:30 (IRST)
  - Summer (DST): UTC+4:30 (IRDT)

Nur (Persian: نور, also Romanized as Nūr) is a village in Kharturan Rural District, Beyarjomand District, Shahrud County, Semnan Province, Iran. At the 2006 census, its population was 92, in 22 families.
