= Shah Bolagh-e Bala =

Village in Semnan province, Iran

Shah Bolagh-e Bala Persian: شاهبلاغ بالا
- Village
- Location within Iran
- Country: Iran
- Province: Semnan
- County: Garmsar
- District: Central
- Rural District: Lajran

Population (2016)
  - Total: 346
- Time zone: UTC+3:30 (IRST)

Shah Bolagh-e Bala (Persian: شاهبلاغ بالا) (Note: Also romanized as Shāh Bolāgh-e Bālā; also known as Shāh Bodāgh (شاهبداغ)) is a village in Lajran Rural District of the Central District in Garmsar County, Semnan province, Iran.

== Demographics ==
=== Population ===
At the time of the 2006 National Census, the village's population was 1,671 in 415 households. The following census in 2011 counted 44 people in 15 households. The 2016 census measured the population of the village as 346 people in 103 households.
