= Mohammadabad, Garmsar =

Village in Semnan province, Iran

Mohammadabad Persian: محمد آباد
- Village
- Location within Iran
- Coordinates: 35°12′53″N 52°25′39″E
- Country: Iran
- Province: Semnan
- County: Garmsar
- District: Central
- Rural District: Howmeh

Population (2016)
  - Total: 342
- Time zone: UTC+3:30 (IRST)

Mohammadabad (Persian: محمد آباد) (Note: Also romanized as Moḩammadābād) is a village in Howmeh Rural District of the Central District in Garmsar County, Semnan province, Iran.

== Demographics ==
=== Population ===
At the time of the 2006 National Census, the village's population was 381 in 107 households. The following census in 2011 counted 362 people in 114 households. The 2016 census measured the population of the village as 342 people in 117 households.
