= Ghiasabad, Semnan =

Village in Semnan province, Iran

Ghiasabad Persian: غياث آباد
- Village
- Location within Iran
- Coordinates: 35°12′26″N 52°18′18″E
- Country: Iran
- Province: Semnan
- County: Garmsar
- District: Central
- Rural District: Lajran

Population (2016)
  - Total: 862
- Time zone: UTC+3:30 (IRST)

Ghiasabad (Persian: غياث آباد) (Note: Also romanized as Gheyāsābād and Ghīās̄ābād; formerly known as Nowdeh-e Khaleseh (نوده خالصه), also romanized as Nowdeh-e Khāleşeh) is a village in Lajran Rural District of the Central District in Garmsar County, Semnan province, Iran.

== Demographics ==
=== Population ===
At the time of the 2006 National Census, the village's population, as Nowdeh-e Khaleseh, was 814 in 238 households. The following census in 2011 counted 914 people in 289 households. The 2016 census measured the population of the village as 862 people in 290 households, by which time it was listed as Ghiasabad.
