= Kariz, Semnan =

Kariz كاريز
- Village
- Location within Iran
- Coordinates: 35°35′11″N 56°48′39″E
- Country: Iran
- Province: Semnan
- County: Shahrud
- Bakhsh: Beyarjomand
- Rural District: Kharturan

Population (2006)
  - Total: 90
- Time zone: UTC+3:30 (IRST)
  - Summer (DST): UTC+4:30 (IRDT)

Kariz (Persian: كاريز, also Romanized as Kārīz) is a village in Kharturan Rural District, Beyarjomand District, Shahrud County, Semnan Province, Iran. At the 2006 census, its population was 90, in 21 families.
