= Barm, Semnan =

Village in Semnan province, Iran

Barm Persian: برم
- Village
- Location within Iran
- Coordinates: 35°34′34″N 56°45′20″E
- Country: Iran
- Province: Semnan
- County: Shahrud
- District: Beyarjomand
- Rural District: Kharturan

Population (2016)
  - Total: 133
- Time zone: UTC+3:30 (IRST)

Barm (Persian: برم) (Note: Also romanized as Beram) is a village in Kharturan Rural District of Beyarjomand District in Shahrud County, Semnan province, Iran.

== Demographics ==
=== Population ===
At the time of the 2006 National Census, the village's population was 131 in 38 households. The following census in 2011 counted 119 people in 39 households. The 2016 census measured the population of the village as 133 people in 47 households.
