= Qaleh Kuchek =

Qaleh Kuchek or Qaleh-ye Kuchek (Persian: قلعه كوچك) may refer to:

- Qaleh Kuchek, Semnan
- Qaleh Kuchek, West Azerbaijan
