= Shah Sefid =

Village in Semnan province, Iran

Shah Sefid Persian: شه سفيد
- Village
- Location within Iran
- Coordinates: 35°10′57″N 52°26′23″E
- Country: Iran
- Province: Semnan
- County: Garmsar
- District: Central
- Rural District: Howmeh

Population (2016)
  - Total: 586
- Time zone: UTC+3:30 (IRST)

Shah Sefid (Persian: شه سفيد) (Note: Also romanized as Shah Sefīd) is a village in Howmeh Rural District of the Central District in Garmsar County, Semnan province, Iran.

== Demographics ==
=== Population ===
At the time of the 2006 National Census, the village's population was 583 in 163 households. The following census in 2011 counted 679 people in 207 households. The 2016 census measured the population of the village as 586 people in 201 households, the most populous in its rural district.
