= Kalateh-ye Rey =

Village in Semnan province, Iran

Kalateh-ye Rey Persian: كلاته ري
- Village
- Location within Iran
- Coordinates: 35°39′32″N 56°36′27″E
- Country: Iran
- Province: Semnan
- County: Shahrud
- District: Beyarjomand
- Rural District: Kharturan

Population (2016)
  - Total: 103
- Time zone: UTC+3:30 (IRST)

Kalateh-ye Rey (Persian: كلاته ري) (Note: Also romanized as Kalāteh-ye Rey) is a village in Kharturan Rural District of Beyarjomand District in Shahrud County, Semnan province, Iran.

== Demographics ==
=== Population ===
At the time of the 2006 National Census, the village's population was 90 in 23 households. The following census in 2011 counted 92 people in 30 households. The 2016 census measured the population of the village as 103 people in 36 households.
