= Kalagh Zili =

Kalagh Zili كلاغ زيلي
- Village
- Location within Iran
- Coordinates: 35°28′18″N 56°45′51″E
- Country: Iran
- Province: Semnan
- County: Shahrud
- Bakhsh: Beyarjomand
- Rural District: Kharturan

Population (2006)
  - Total: 16
- Time zone: UTC+3:30 (IRST)
  - Summer (DST): UTC+4:30 (IRDT)

Kalagh Zili (Persian: كلاغ زيلي, also Romanized as Kalāgh Zīlī; also known as Kalāgh Zīrī) is a village in Kharturan Rural District, Beyarjomand District, Shahrud County, Semnan Province, Iran. At the 2006 census, its population was 16, in 5 families.
