= Qahej-e Bala =

Qahej-e Bala قهيج بالا
- Village
- Location within Iran
- Coordinates: 36°34′21″N 55°04′55″E
- Country: Iran
- Province: Semnan
- County: Shahrud
- Bakhsh: Bastam
- Rural District: Kharqan

Population (2006)
  - Total: 204
- Time zone: UTC+3:30 (IRST)
  - Summer (DST): UTC+4:30 (IRDT)

Qahej-e Bala (Persian: قهيج بالا, also Romanized as Qahej-e Bālā) is a village in Kharqan Rural District, Bastam District, Shahrud County, Semnan Province, Iran. At the 2006 census, its population was 204, in 57 families.
