= Hajjiabad-e Razveh =

Hajjiabad-e Razveh حاجي آباد رضوه
- Village
- Location within Iran
- Coordinates: 36°06′48″N 54°11′42″E
- Country: Iran
- Province: Semnan
- County: Damghan
- Bakhsh: Amirabad
- Rural District: Qohab-e Sarsar

Population (2006)
  - Total: 25
- Time zone: UTC+3:30 (IRST)
  - Summer (DST): UTC+4:30 (IRDT)

Hajjiabad-e Razveh (Persian: حاجی آباد رضوه, also Romanized as Ḩājjīābād-e Raẕveh) is a village in Qohab-e Sarsar Rural District, Amirabad District, Damghan County, Semnan Province, Iran. At the 2006 census, its population was 25, in 7 families.

The Ismaili castle of Gerdkuh is located nearby.
