= Robat-e Zang =

Robat-e Zang رباطزنگ
- Village
- Location within Iran
- Coordinates: 35°32′01″N 56°48′54″E
- Country: Iran
- Province: Semnan
- County: Shahrud
- Bakhsh: Beyarjomand
- Rural District: Kharturan

Population (2006)
  - Total: 47
- Time zone: UTC+3:30 (IRST)
  - Summer (DST): UTC+4:30 (IRDT)

Robat-e Zang (Persian: رباطزنگ, also Romanized as Robāţ-e Zang) is a village in Kharturan Rural District, Beyarjomand District, Shahrud County, Semnan Province, Iran. At the 2006 census, its population was 47, in 13 families.
