= Tajur =

Tajur تجور
- Village
- Country: Iran
- Province: Semnan
- County: Shahrud
- Bakhsh: Beyarjomand
- Rural District: Kharturan

Population (2006)
  - Total: 14
- Time zone: UTC+3:30 (IRST)
  - Summer (DST): UTC+4:30 (IRDT)

Tajur (Persian: تجور, also Romanized as Tajūr) is a village in the Kharturan Rural District, Beyarjomand District, Shahrud County, Semnan Province, Iran. At the 2006 census, its population was 14, in 5 families.
