= Deraz Ab, Semnan =

Deraz Ab درازآب
- Village
- Location within Iran
- Coordinates: 35°25′16″N 56°51′39″E
- Country: Iran
- Province: Semnan
- County: Shahrud
- Bakhsh: Beyarjomand
- Rural District: Kharturan

Population (2006)
  - Total: 102
- Time zone: UTC+3:30 (IRST)
  - Summer (DST): UTC+4:30 (IRDT)

Deraz Ab (Persian: درازآب, also Romanized as Derāz Āb; also known as Derāz and Derazū) is a village in Kharturan Rural District, Beyarjomand District, Shahrud County, Semnan Province, Iran. At the 2006 census, its population was 102, in 25 families.
