= Fand, Iran =

Village in Semnan province, Iran

Fand Persian: فند
- Village
- Location within Iran
- Coordinates: 35°11′03″N 52°27′19″E
- Country: Iran
- Province: Semnan
- County: Garmsar
- District: Central
- Rural District: Howmeh

Population (2016)
  - Total: 366
- Time zone: UTC+3:30 (IRST)

Fand (Persian: فند) is a village in Howmeh Rural District of the Central District in Garmsar County, Semnan province, Iran.

== Demographics ==
=== Population ===
At the time of the 2006 National Census, the village's population was 394 in 100 households. The following census in 2011 counted 444 people in 133 households. The 2016 census measured the population of the village as 366 people in 144 households.
