= Sharifiyeh, Semnan =

Sharifiyeh شريفيه
- Village
- Location within Iran
- Coordinates: 35°59′14″N 54°15′18″E
- Country: Iran
- Province: Semnan
- County: Damghan
- Bakhsh: Amirabad
- Rural District: Qohab-e Rastaq

Population (2006)
  - Total: 24
- Time zone: UTC+3:30 (IRST)
  - Summer (DST): UTC+4:30 (IRDT)

Sharifiyeh (Persian: شريفيه, also Romanized as Sharīfīyeh) is a village in Qohab-e Rastaq Rural District, Amirabad District, Damghan County, Semnan Province, Iran. At the 2006 census, its population was 24, in 8 families.
