= Nahar, Iran =

Nahar (Persian: ناهر or نهار) in Iran may refer to:

- Nahar, East Azerbaijan (نهار - Nahār)
- Nahar, Semnan (ناهر - Nāhar)
