= Hajjiabad-e Atashgah =

Village in Semnan province, Iran

Hajjiabad-e Atashgah Persian: حاجي اباداتشگاه
- Village
- Location within Iran
- Coordinates: 35°14′29″N 52°24′10″E
- Country: Iran
- Province: Semnan
- County: Garmsar
- District: Central
- Rural District: Lajran

Population (2016)
  - Total: 791
- Time zone: UTC+3:30 (IRST)

Hajjiabad-e Atashgah (Persian: حاجي اباداتشگاه) (Note: Also romanized as Ḩājjīābād-e Ātashgāh; also known as Hājī Ābād and Ḩājjīābād) is a village in Lajran Rural District of the Central District in Garmsar County, Semnan province, Iran.

== Demographics ==
=== Population ===
At the time of the 2006 National Census, the village's population was 827 in 221 households. The following census in 2011 counted 576 people in 174 households. The 2016 census measured the population of the village as 791 people in 242 households.
