= Mianabad, Semnan =

Village in Semnan province, Iran

Mianabad Persian: ميان آباد
- Village
- Location within Iran
- Coordinates: 36°30′17″N 55°02′13″E
- Country: Iran
- Province: Semnan
- County: Shahrud
- District: Bastam
- Rural District: Kharqan

Population (2016)
  - Total: 574
- Time zone: UTC+3:30 (IRST)

Mianabad (Persian: ميان آباد) (Note: Also romanized as Mīānābād; also known as Mīnābād) is a village in Kharqan Rural District (Note: Formerly Bastam Rural District) of Bastam District in Shahrud County, Semnan province, Iran.

== Demographics ==
=== Population ===
At the time of the 2006 National Census, the village's population was 539 in 143 households. The following census in 2011 counted 489 people in 144 households. The 2016 census measured the population of the village as 574 people in 186 households.
