= Nowdeh-e Arbabi =

Village in Semnan province, Iran

Nowdeh-e Arbabi Persian: نوده اربابي
- Village
- Location within Iran
- Coordinates: 35°12′44″N 52°19′26″E
- Country: Iran
- Province: Semnan
- County: Garmsar
- District: Central
- Rural District: Lajran

Population (2016)
  - Total: 897
- Time zone: UTC+3:30 (IRST)

Nowdeh-e Arbabi (Persian: نوده اربابي) (Note: Also romanized as Nowdeh-e Arbābī) is a village in Lajran Rural District of the Central District in Garmsar County, Semnan province, Iran.

== Demographics ==
=== Population ===
At the time of the 2006 National Census, the village's population was 251 in 74 households. The following census in 2011 counted 464 people in 145 households. The 2016 census measured the population of the village as 897 people in 272 households.
