= Bakhshabad, Semnan =

Bakhshabad بخش آباد
- Village
- Location within Iran
- Coordinates: 36°05′09″N 54°10′54″E
- Country: Iran
- Province: Semnan
- County: Damghan
- Bakhsh: Amirabad
- Rural District: Qohab-e Sarsar

Population (2006)
  - Total: 84
- Time zone: UTC+3:30 (IRST)
  - Summer (DST): UTC+4:30 (IRDT)

Bakhshabad (Persian: بخش آباد, also Romanized as Bakhshābād and Bekahashābād) is a village in Qohab-e Sarsar Rural District, Amirabad District, Damghan County, Semnan Province, Iran. At the 2006 census, its population was 84, in 33 families.
