= Sharifiyeh =

Sharifiyeh (Persian: شريفيه) may refer to:

- Sharifiyeh, Khuzestan
- Sharifiyeh, Qazvin
- Sharifiyeh, Semnan
