= Karand, Semnan =

Village in Semnan province, Iran

Karand Persian: كرند
- Village
- Location within Iran
- Coordinates: 35°14′14″N 52°20′38″E
- Country: Iran
- Province: Semnan
- County: Garmsar
- District: Central
- Rural District: Lajran

Population (2016)
  - Total: 1,273
- Time zone: UTC+3:30 (IRST)

Karand (Persian: كرند) (Note: Also romanized as Kerand) is a village in Lajran Rural District of the Central District in Garmsar County, Semnan province, Iran.

== Demographics ==
=== Population ===
At the time of the 2006 National Census, the village's population was 777 in 205 households. The following census in 2011 counted 1,104 people in 322 households. The 2016 census measured the population of the village as 1,273 people in 386 households, the most populous in its rural district.
