= Aminabad, Semnan =

Aminabad امين آباد
- Village
- Location within Iran
- Coordinates: 35°24′33″N 56°53′53″E
- Country: Iran
- Province: Semnan
- County: Shahrud
- Bakhsh: Beyarjomand
- Rural District: Kharturan

Population (2006)
  - Total: 59
- Time zone: UTC+3:30 (IRST)
  - Summer (DST): UTC+4:30 (IRDT)

Aminabad (Persian: امين آباد, also Romanized as Amīnābād; also known as Kalāteh-ye Amīnābād and Kalāteh-ye Ḩājjī Bābā) is a village in Kharturan Rural District, Beyarjomand District, Shahrud County, Semnan Province, Iran. At the 2006 census, its population was 59, in 13 families.
