= Lajran =

Village in Semnan province, Iran

Lajran Persian: لجران
- Village
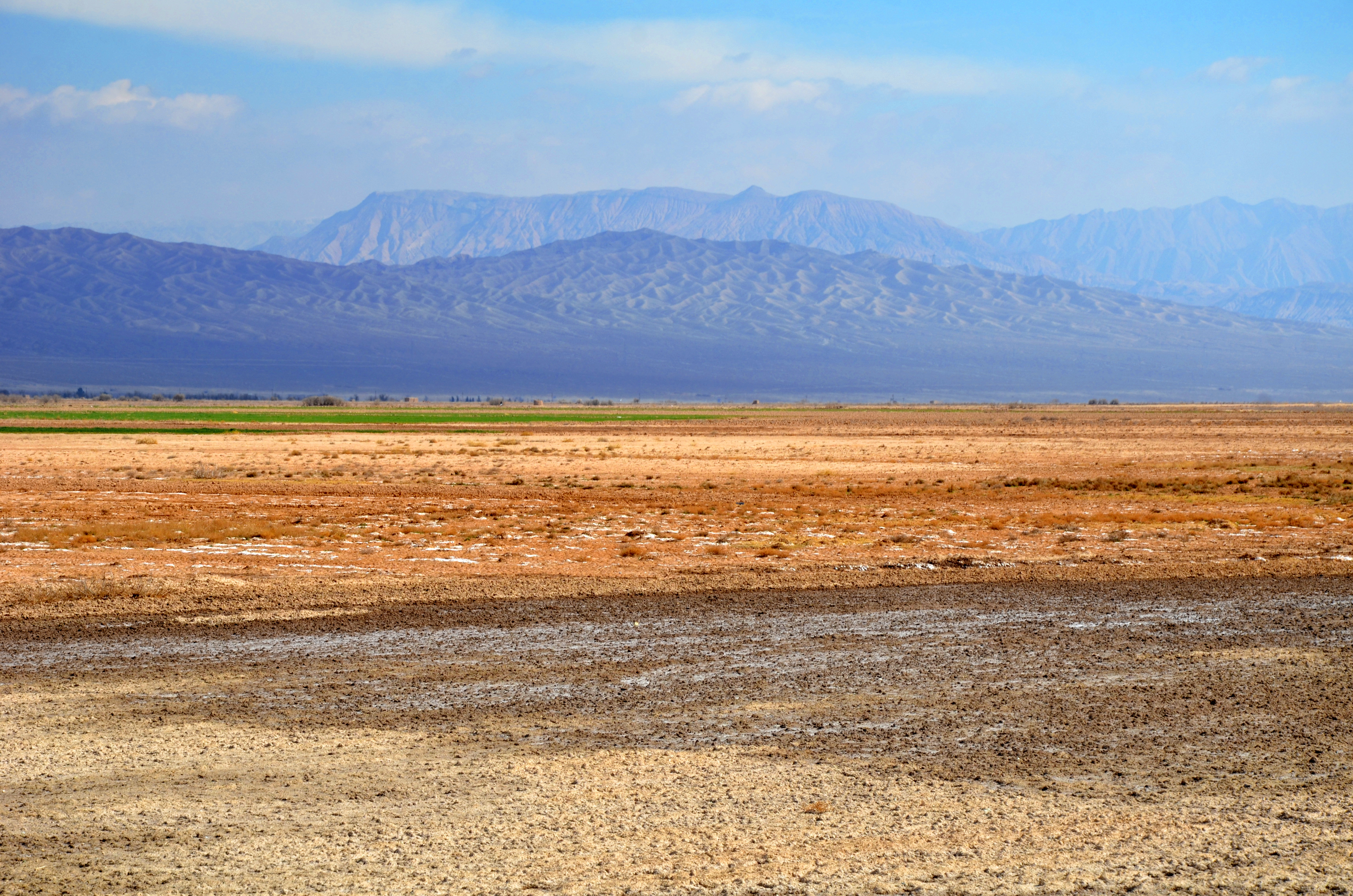
- The village of Lajran in the distance

- Location within Iran
- Coordinates: 35°11′49″N 52°19′37″E
- Country: Iran
- Province: Semnan
- County: Garmsar
- District: Central
- Rural District: Lajran

Population (2016)
  - Total: 787
- Time zone: UTC+3:30 (IRST)

Lajran (Persian: لجران) (Note: Also romanized as Lajrān) is a village in, and the capital of, Lajran Rural District in the Central District of Garmsar County, Semnan province, Iran.

== Demographics ==
=== Population ===
At the time of the 2006 National Census, the village's population was 382 in 102 households. The following census in 2011 counted 683 people in 159 households. The 2016 census measured the population of the village as 787 people in 160 households.
