= Kardovan =

Village in Semnan province, Iran

Kardovan Persian: کردوان
- Village
- Location within Iran
- Coordinates: 35°10′58″N 52°24′19″E
- Country: Iran
- Province: Semnan
- County: Garmsar
- District: Central
- Rural District: Howmeh

Population (2016)
  - Total: 306
- Time zone: UTC+3:30 (IRST)

Kardovan (Persian: کردوان) (Note: Also romanized as Kardavān, Kardovān, Kardvān, and Kardwān) is a village in, and the capital of, Howmeh Rural District in the Central District of Garmsar County, Semnan province, Iran.

== Demographics ==
=== Population ===
At the time of the 2006 National Census, the village's population was 240 in 63 households. The following census in 2011 counted 307 people in 101 households. The 2016 census measured the population of the village as 306 people in 108 households.
