= Avazabad, Semnan =

Avazabad عوض آباد
- Village
- Location within Iran
- Coordinates: 36°06′36″N 54°12′15″E
- Country: Iran
- Province: Semnan
- County: Damghan
- Bakhsh: Amirabad
- Rural District: Qohab-e Sarsar

Population (2006)
  - Total: 26
- Time zone: UTC+3:30 (IRST)
  - Summer (DST): UTC+4:30 (IRDT)

Avazabad (Persian: عوض آباد, also Romanized as ‘Avaẕābād) is a village in Qohab-e Sarsar Rural District, Amirabad District, Damghan County, Semnan Province, Iran. At the 2006 census, its population was 26, in 11 families.
