= Salehabad, Beyarjomand =

Village in Semnan province, Iran

Salehabad Persian: صالح آباد
- Village
- Location within Iran
- Coordinates: 35°33′27″N 56°48′17″E
- Country: Iran
- Province: Semnan
- County: Shahrud
- District: Beyarjomand
- Rural District: Kharturan

Population (2016)
  - Total: 168
- Time zone: UTC+3:30 (IRST)

Salehabad (Persian: صالح آباد) (Note: Also romanized as Şāleḩābād; also known as Şoleḩābād and Solh Ābād) is a village in Kharturan Rural District of Beyarjomand District in Shahrud County, Semnan province, Iran.

== Demographics ==
=== Population ===
At the time of the 2006 National Census, the village's population was 195 in 55 households. The following census in 2011 counted 159 people in 54 households. The 2016 census measured the population of the village as 168 people in 57 households.
