= Kushk-e Khaleseh-ye Pain =

Kushk-e Khaleseh-ye Pain كوشك خالصه پائين
- Village
- Location within Iran
- Coordinates: 35°10′47″N 52°21′20″E
- Country: Iran
- Province: Semnan
- County: Garmsar
- Bakhsh: Central
- Rural District: Lajran

Population (2006)
  - Total: 29
- Time zone: UTC+3:30 (IRST)
  - Summer (DST): UTC+4:30 (IRDT)

Kushk-e Khaleseh-ye Pain (Persian: كوشك خالصه پائين, also Romanized as Kūshk-e Khāleşeh-ye Pā’īn; also known as Kūshk-e Pā’īn) is a village in Lajran Rural District, in the Central District of Garmsar County, Semnan Province, Iran. At the 2006 census, its population was 29, in 7 families.
