= Reshmeh =

Village in Semnan province, Iran

Reshmeh Persian: رشمه
- Village
- Location within Iran
- Coordinates: 35°09′49″N 52°24′44″E
- Country: Iran
- Province: Semnan
- County: Garmsar
- District: Central
- Rural District: Howmeh

Population (2016)
  - Total: 284
- Time zone: UTC+3:30 (IRST)

Reshmeh (Persian: رشمه) (Note: Also romanized as Rashmeh; also known as Rishmeh) is a village in Howmeh Rural District of the Central District in Garmsar County, Semnan province, Iran.

== Demographics ==
=== Population ===
At the time of the 2006 National Census, the village's population was 189 in 57 households. The following census in 2011 counted 121 people in 37 households. The 2016 census measured the population of the village as 284 people in 92 households.
