= Abarsij =

Village in Semnan province, Iran

Abarsij Persian: ابرسيج
- Village
- Location within Iran
- Coordinates: 36°34′54″N 54°55′14″E
- Country: Iran
- Province: Semnan
- County: Shahrud
- District: Bastam
- Rural District: Kharqan

Population (2016)
  - Total: 1,004
- Time zone: UTC+3:30 (IRST)

Abarsij (Persian: ابرسيج) (Note: Also romanized as Abarsīj; also known as Abarsaj, Abarsej, and Abrsaj) is a village in Kharqan Rural District (Note: Formerly Bastam Rural District) of Bastam District in Shahrud County, Semnan province, Iran.

== Demographics ==
=== Population ===
At the time of the 2006 National Census, the village's population was 1,193 in 341 households. The following census in 2011 counted 1,064 people in 354 households. The 2016 census measured the population of the village as 1,004 people in 351 households.
