= Aliabad-e Motalleb Khan =

Aliabad-e Motalleb Khan علی‌آباد مطلب‌خان
- Village
- Location within Iran
- Coordinates: 36°05′53″N 54°11′56″E
- Country: Iran
- Province: Semnan
- County: Damghan
- Bakhsh: Amirabad
- Rural District: Qohab-e Sarsar

Population (2006)
  - Total: 81
- Time zone: UTC+3:30 (IRST)
  - Summer (DST): UTC+4:30 (IRDT)

Aliabad-e Motalleb Khan (Persian: علی‌آباد مطلب‌خان, also Romanized as ‘Alīābād-e Moţalleb Khān and ‘Alīābād-e Moţleb Khān; also known as ‘Alīābād) is a village in Qohab-e Sarsar Rural District, Amirabad District, Damghan County, Semnan Province, Iran. At the 2006 census, its population was 81, in 27 families.
