= Farinu-ye Bala =

Farinu-ye Bala فرينوبالا
- Village
- Location within Iran
- Coordinates: 35°26′21″N 56°49′40″E
- Country: Iran
- Province: Semnan
- County: Shahrud
- Bakhsh: Beyarjomand
- Rural District: Kharturan

Population (2006)
  - Total: 89
- Time zone: UTC+3:30 (IRST)
  - Summer (DST): UTC+4:30 (IRDT)

Farinu-ye Bala (Persian: فرينوبالا, also Romanized as Farīnū-ye Bālā) is a village in Kharturan Rural District, Beyarjomand District, Shahrud County, Semnan Province, Iran. At the 2006 census, its population was 89, in 23 families.
