= Jafarabad, Beyarjomand =

Jafarabad جعفراباد
- Village
- Location within Iran
- Coordinates: 35°33′59″N 56°45′03″E
- Country: Iran
- Province: Semnan
- County: Shahrud
- Bakhsh: Beyarjomand
- Rural District: Kharturan

Population (2006)
  - Total: 62
- Time zone: UTC+3:30 (IRST)
  - Summer (DST): UTC+4:30 (IRDT)

Jafarabad (Persian: جعفراباد, also Romanized as Ja‘farābād) is a village in Kharturan Rural District, Beyarjomand District, Shahrud County, Semnan Province, Iran. At the 2006 census, its population was 62, in 18 families.
