= Farvar =

Village in Semnan province, Iran

Farvar Persian: فرور
- Village
- Location within Iran
- Coordinates: 35°14′26″N 52°20′20″E
- Country: Iran
- Province: Semnan
- County: Garmsar
- District: Central
- Rural District: Lajran

Population (2016)
  - Total: 760
- Time zone: UTC+3:30 (IRST)

Farvar (Persian: فرور) (Note: Also romanized as Farvār) is a village in Lajran Rural District of the Central District in Garmsar County, Semnan province, Iran.

== Demographics ==
=== Population ===
At the time of the 2006 National Census, the village's population was 706 in 186 households. The following census in 2011 counted 1,037 people in 319 households. The 2016 census measured the population of the village as 760 people in 268 households.
