= Khurzan =

Village in Semnan province, Iran

Khurzan Persian: خورزان
- Village
- Location within Iran
- Coordinates: 35°56′45″N 54°20′27″E
- Country: Iran
- Province: Semnan
- County: Damghan
- District: Amirabad
- Rural District: Qohab-e Rastaq

Population (2016)
  - Total: 477
- Time zone: UTC+3:30 (IRST)

Khurzan (Persian: خورزان) (Note: Also romanized as Khowzrān and Khūrzān) is a village in Qohab-e Rastaq Rural District of Amirabad District in Damghan County, Semnan province, Iran.

== Demographics ==
=== Population ===
At the time of the 2006 National Census, the village's population was 398 in 106 households. The following census in 2011 counted 368 people in 103 households. The 2016 census measured the population of the village as 477 people in 151 households.
