= Qaleh-ye Aqa =

Village in Semnan province, Iran

Qaleh-ye Aqa Persian: قلعه آقا
- Village
- Location within Iran
- Coordinates: 36°35′47″N 55°03′26″E
- Country: Iran
- Province: Semnan
- County: Shahrud
- District: Bastam
- Rural District: Kharqan

Population (2016)
  - Total: 874
- Time zone: UTC+3:30 (IRST)

Qaleh-ye Aqa (Persian: قلعه آقا) (Note: Also romanized as Qal‘eh-ye Āqā; also known as Qal‘eh-ye Āqā ‘Abdollāh) is a village in Kharqan Rural District (Note: Formerly Bastam Rural District) of Bastam District in Shahrud County, Semnan province, Iran.

== Demographics ==
=== Population ===
At the time of the 2006 National Census, the village's population was 1,045 in 285 households. The following census in 2011 counted 983 people in 298 households. The 2016 census measured the population of the village as 874 people in 294 households.
