= Kalateh-ye Motahhari =

Kalateh-ye Motahhari كلاته مطهري
- Village
- Location within Iran
- Coordinates: 35°38′58″N 56°34′04″E
- Country: Iran
- Province: Semnan
- County: Shahrud
- Bakhsh: Beyarjomand
- Rural District: Kharturan

Population (2006)
  - Total: 72
- Time zone: UTC+3:30 (IRST)
  - Summer (DST): UTC+4:30 (IRDT)

Kalateh-ye Motahhari (Persian: كلاته مطهري, also Romanized as Kalāteh-ye Moţahharī; also known as Deh-e Moţahharī) is a village in Kharturan Rural District, Beyarjomand District, Shahrud County, Semnan Province, Iran. At the 2006 census, its population was 72, in 18 families.
