= Abu ol Hasani =

Abu ol Hasani ابوالحسني
- Village
- Location within Iran
- Coordinates: 35°24′32″N 56°53′55″E
- Country: Iran
- Province: Semnan
- County: Shahrud
- Bakhsh: Beyarjomand
- Rural District: Kharturan

Population (2006)
  - Total: 56
- Time zone: UTC+3:30 (IRST)
  - Summer (DST): UTC+4:30 (IRDT)

Abu ol Hasani (Persian: ابوالحسني, also Romanized as Abū ol Ḩasanī) is a village in Kharturan Rural District, Beyarjomand District, Shahrud County, Semnan Province, Iran. At the 2006 census, its population was 56, in 16 families.
