= Towchal =

Towchal (Persian: توچال) may refer to:

- Towchal, Semnan
- Towchal, Tehran
