= Faridar =

Faridar فريدر
- Village
- Location within Iran
- Coordinates: 35°34′40″N 56°45′39″E
- Country: Iran
- Province: Semnan
- County: Shahrud
- Bakhsh: Beyarjomand
- Rural District: Kharturan

Population (2006)
  - Total: 61
- Time zone: UTC+3:30 (IRST)
  - Summer (DST): UTC+4:30 (IRDT)

Faridar (Persian: فريدر, also Romanized as Farīdar) is a village in Kharturan Rural District, Beyarjomand District, Shahrud County, Semnan Province, Iran. At the 2006 census, its population was 61, in 20 families.
