= Garmab-e Bala =

Garmab-e Bala گرماب بالا
- Village
- Location within Iran
- Coordinates: 35°21′18″N 56°52′41″E
- Country: Iran
- Province: Semnan
- County: Shahrud
- Bakhsh: Beyarjomand
- Rural District: Kharturan

Population (2006)
  - Total: 39
- Time zone: UTC+3:30 (IRST)
  - Summer (DST): UTC+4:30 (IRDT)

Garmab-e Bala (Persian: گرماب بالا, also Romanized as Garmāb-e Bālā and Garmāb Bālā) is a village in Kharturan Rural District, Beyarjomand District, Shahrud County, Semnan Province, Iran. At the 2006 census, its population was 39, in 8 families.
