= Garmab-e Pain =

Garmab-e Pain گرماب پائين
- Village
- Location within Iran
- Coordinates: 35°20′49″N 56°53′40″E
- Country: Iran
- Province: Semnan
- County: Shahrud
- Bakhsh: Beyarjomand
- Rural District: Kharturan

Population (2006)
  - Total: 119
- Time zone: UTC+3:30 (IRST)
  - Summer (DST): UTC+4:30 (IRDT)

Garmab-e Pain (Persian: گرماب پائين, also Romanized as Garmāb-e Pā’īn and Garmāb Pā’īn; also known as Garmāb) is a village in Kharturan Rural District, Beyarjomand District, Shahrud County, Semnan Province, Iran. At the 2006 census, its population was 119, in 28 families.
