= Qaleh Chek =

Qaleh Chek قلعه چك
- Village
- Location within Iran
- Coordinates: 35°10′55″N 52°25′00″E
- Country: Iran
- Province: Semnan
- County: Garmsar
- Bakhsh: Central
- Rural District: Howmeh

Population (2006)
  - Total: 60
- Time zone: UTC+3:30 (IRST)
  - Summer (DST): UTC+4:30 (IRDT)

Qaleh Chek (Persian: قلعه چك, also Romanized as Qal‘eh Chek; also known as Qal‘eh Kūchek) is a village in Howmeh Rural District, in the Central District of Garmsar County, Semnan Province, Iran. At the 2006 census, its population was 60, in 18 families.
