= Eshqevan =

Village in Semnan province, Iran

Eshqevan Persian: عشقوان
- Village
- Location within Iran
- Coordinates: 35°32′59″N 56°45′39″E
- Country: Iran
- Province: Semnan
- County: Shahrud
- District: Beyarjomand
- Rural District: Kharturan

Population (2016)
  - Total: 114
- Time zone: UTC+3:30 (IRST)

Eshqevan (Persian: عشقوان) (Note: Also romanized as ‘Eshqevān) is a village in Kharturan Rural District of Beyarjomand District in Shahrud County, Semnan province, Iran.

== Demographics ==
=== Population ===
At the time of the 2006 National Census, the village's population was 133 in 37 households. The following census in 2011 counted 86 people in 31 households. The 2016 census measured the population of the village as 114 people in 42 households.
