= Malijan-e Pain =

Malijan-e Pain مليجان پائين
- Village
- Location within Iran
- Coordinates: 35°11′18″N 52°22′44″E
- Country: Iran
- Province: Semnan
- County: Garmsar
- Bakhsh: Central
- Rural District: Howmeh

Population (2006)
  - Total: 84
- Time zone: UTC+3:30 (IRST)
  - Summer (DST): UTC+4:30 (IRDT)

Malijan-e Pain (Persian: مليجان پائين, also Romanized as Malījān-e Pā’īn; also known as Malījān) is a village in Howmeh Rural District, in the Central District of Garmsar County, Semnan Province, Iran. At the 2006 census, its population was 84, in 21 families.
