= Rikan, Semnan =

Village in Semnan province, Iran

Rikan Persian: ريكان
- Village
- Location within Iran
- Coordinates: 35°11′20″N 52°23′26″E
- Country: Iran
- Province: Semnan
- County: Garmsar
- District: Central
- Rural District: Howmeh

Population (2016)
  - Total: 435
- Time zone: UTC+3:30 (IRST)

Rikan (Persian: ريكان) (Note: Also romanized as Rīkān) is a village in Howmeh Rural District of the Central District in Garmsar County, Semnan province, Iran.

== Demographics ==
=== Population ===
At the time of the 2006 National Census, the village's population was 354 in 100 households. The following census in 2011 counted 370 people in 106 households. The 2016 census measured the population of the village as 435 people in 153 households.
