= Hoseynan =

Hoseynan حسينان
- Village
- Location within Iran
- Coordinates: 35°13′24″N 54°33′31″E
- Country: Iran
- Province: Semnan
- County: Damghan
- Bakhsh: Amirabad
- Rural District: Qohab-e Rastaq

Population (2006)
  - Total: 178
- Time zone: UTC+3:30 (IRST)
  - Summer (DST): UTC+4:30 (IRDT)

Hoseynan (Persian: حسينان, also Romanized as Ḩoseynān and Ḩoseynān; also known as Ḩoseynīān, Hoseynīyān, Husain Nūd, Husain Nūn, and Husinan) is a village in Qohab-e Rastaq Rural District, Amirabad District, Damghan County, Semnan Province, Iran. At the 2006 census, its population was 178, in 50 families.
