= Hajjaj, Iran =

Hajjaj حجاج
- Village
- Location within Iran
- Coordinates: 35°33′30″N 56°58′35″E
- Country: Iran
- Province: Semnan
- County: Shahrud
- Bakhsh: Beyarjomand
- Rural District: Kharturan

Population (2006)
  - Total: 126
- Time zone: UTC+3:30 (IRST)
  - Summer (DST): UTC+4:30 (IRDT)

Hajjaj (Persian: حجاج, also Romanized as Ḩajjāj) is a village in Kharturan Rural District, Beyarjomand District, Shahrud County, Semnan Province, Iran. At the 2006 census, its population was 126, in 33 families.
