= Kolamu =

Village in Semnan province, Iran

Kolamu Persian: كلامو
- Village
- Location within Iran
- Coordinates: 36°36′12″N 55°03′47″E
- Country: Iran
- Province: Semnan
- County: Shahrud
- District: Bastam
- Rural District: Kharqan

Population (2016)
  - Total: 574
- Time zone: UTC+3:30 (IRST)

Kolamu (Persian: كلامو) (Note: Also romanized as Kolāmū) is a village in Kharqan Rural District (Note: Formerly Bastam Rural District) of Bastam District in Shahrud County, Semnan province, Iran.

== Demographics ==
=== Population ===
At the time of the 2006 National Census, the village's population was 737 in 197 households. The following census in 2011 counted 593 people in 188 households. The 2016 census measured the population of the village as 574 people in 193 households.
