= Qatul =

Village in Semnan province, Iran

Qatul Persian: قاطول
- Village
- Location within Iran
- Coordinates: 35°12′00″N 52°23′22″E
- Country: Iran
- Province: Semnan
- County: Garmsar
- District: Central
- Rural District: Howmeh

Population (2016)
  - Total: 219
- Time zone: UTC+3:30 (IRST)

Qatul (Persian: قاطول) (Note: Also romanized as Qāţūl; also known as Qāţūn) is a village in Howmeh Rural District of the Central District in Garmsar County, Semnan province, Iran.

== Demographics ==
=== Population ===
At the time of the 2006 National Census, the village's population was 164 in 42 households. The following census in 2011 counted 195 people in 61 households. The 2016 census measured the population of the village as 219 people in 78 households.
