= Moalleman =

Village in Semnan, Iran

Moalleman معلمان
- Village
- Location within Iran
- Coordinates: 35°13′05″N 54°34′09″E
- Country: Iran
- Province: Semnan
- County: Damghan
- Bakhsh: Amirabad
- Rural District: Qohab-e Rastaq

Population (2006)
  - Total: 190
- Time zone: UTC+3:30 (IRST)

Moalleman (Persian: معلمان, also Romanized as Mo‘allemān, Maluman, and Mu‘allaman) is a village in Qohab-e Rastaq Rural District, Amirabad District, Damghan County, Semnan Province, Iran. At the 2006 census, its population was 190, in 51 families.
