= Malijan-e Bala =

Village in Semnan province, Iran

Malijan-e Bala Persian: مليجان بالا
- Village
- Location within Iran
- Coordinates: 35°14′24″N 52°24′17″E
- Country: Iran
- Province: Semnan
- County: Garmsar
- District: Central
- Rural District: Howmeh

Population (2016)
  - Total: 357
- Time zone: UTC+3:30 (IRST)

Malijan-e Bala (Persian: مليجان بالا) (Note: Also romanized as Malījān-e Bālā) is a village in Howmeh Rural District of the Central District in Garmsar County, Semnan province, Iran.

== Demographics ==
=== Population ===
At the time of the 2006 National Census, the village's population was 298 in 88 households. The following census in 2011 counted 350 people in 102 households. The 2016 census measured the population of the village as 357 people in 98 households.
