= Sazaman-e Reza Ajdadi =

Sazaman-e Reza Ajdadi سازمان رضااجدادي
- Village
- Country: Iran
- Province: Semnan
- County: Shahrud
- Bakhsh: Meyami
- Rural District: Meyami

Population (2006)
  - Total: 19
- Time zone: UTC+3:30 (IRST)
  - Summer (DST): UTC+4:30 (IRDT)

Sazaman-e Reza Ajdadi (Persian: سازمان رضااجدادي, also Romanized as Sāzamān-e Rez̤ā Ājdādī) is a village in Meyami Rural District, Meyami District, Shahrud County, Semnan Province, Iran. At the 2006 census, its population was 19, in 5 families.
