= Abu ol Baq =

Abu ol Baq ابوالبق
- Village
- Location within Iran
- Coordinates: 36°13′10″N 54°22′48″E
- Country: Iran
- Province: Semnan
- County: Damghan
- Bakhsh: Central
- Rural District: Howmeh

Population (2006)
  - Total: 70
- Time zone: UTC+3:30 (IRST)
  - Summer (DST): UTC+4:30 (IRDT)

Abu ol Baq (Persian: ابوالبق, also Romanized as Abū ol Baq; also known as Abol Beq) is a village in Howmeh Rural District, in the Central District of Damghan County, Semnan Province, Iran. At the 2006 census, its population was 70, in 23 families.
