= Sazaman-e Saidi va Sherka =

Sazaman-e Saidi va Sherka سازمان سعيدي وشركا
- Village
- Country: Iran
- Province: Semnan
- County: Shahrud
- Bakhsh: Meyami
- Rural District: Meyami

Population (2006)
  - Total: 61
- Time zone: UTC+3:30 (IRST)
  - Summer (DST): UTC+4:30 (IRDT)

Sazaman-e Saidi va Sherka (Persian: سازمان سعيدي وشركا, also Romanized as Sāzamān-e Saʿīdī va Sherḵā) is a village in Meyami Rural District, Meyami District, Shahrud County, Semnan Province, Iran. At the 2006 census, its population was 61, in 14 families.
