= Rasul Akram Scientific Centre =

Rasul Akram Scientific Centre مركزاموزش علمي كاربردئ رسول اكرم
- Village/scientific centre
- Country: Iran
- Province: Semnan
- County: Damghan
- Bakhsh: Central
- Rural District: Rudbar

Population (2006)
  - Total: 12
- Time zone: UTC+3:30 (IRST)
  - Summer (DST): UTC+4:30 (IRDT)

Rasul Akram Scientific Centre (Persian: مركزاموزش علمي كاربردئ رسول اكرم – Marḵazāmūzash ʿAlmī Kārbardy Rasūl Āḵram) is a village and scientific centre in Rudbar Rural District, in the Central District of Damghan County, Semnan Province, Iran. At the 2006 census, its population was 12, in 4 families.
