= Towchal, Semnan =

Towchal توچال
- Village
- Location within Iran
- Coordinates: 35°38′30″N 56°39′10″E
- Country: Iran
- Province: Semnan
- County: Shahrud
- Bakhsh: Beyarjomand
- Rural District: Kharturan

Population (2006)
  - Total: 26
- Time zone: UTC+3:30 (IRST)
  - Summer (DST): UTC+4:30 (IRDT)

Towchal (Persian: توچال, also Romanized as Towchāl; also known as Tow Chāh, Tū Chāh, and Tu-i-Chāh) is a village in Kharturan Rural District, Beyarjomand District, Shahrud County, Semnan Province, Iran. At the 2006 census, its population was 26, in 8 families.
