= Qaleh-ye Bala Baram =

Qaleh-ye Bala Baram قلعه بالابرم
- Village
- Country: Iran
- Province: Semnan
- County: Damghan
- Bakhsh: Central
- Rural District: Howmeh

Population (2006)
  - Total: 115
- Time zone: UTC+3:30 (IRST)
  - Summer (DST): UTC+4:30 (IRDT)

Qaleh-ye Bala Baram (Persian: قلعه بالابرم, also Romanized as Qal‘eh-ye Bālā Baram) is a village in Howmeh Rural District, in the Central District of Damghan County, Semnan Province, Iran. At the 2006 census, its population was 115, in 32 families.
