= Behvard =

Behvard بهورد
- Village
- Location within Iran
- Coordinates: 35°27′26″N 51°57′23″E
- Country: Iran
- Province: Semnan
- County: Garmsar
- Bakhsh: Eyvanki
- Rural District: Eyvanki

Population (2006)
  - Total: 21
- Time zone: UTC+3:30 (IRST)
  - Summer (DST): UTC+4:30 (IRDT)

Behvard (Persian: بهورد) is a village in Eyvanki Rural District, Eyvanki District, Garmsar County, Semnan Province, Iran. At the 2006 census, its population was 21, in 6 families.
