= Shaman, Iran =

Shaman شامان
- Village
- Location within Iran
- Coordinates: 36°06′36″N 54°24′38″E
- Country: Iran
- Province: Semnan
- County: Damghan
- Bakhsh: Central
- Rural District: Howmeh

Population (2006)
  - Total: 27
- Time zone: UTC+3:30 (IRST)
  - Summer (DST): UTC+4:30 (IRDT)

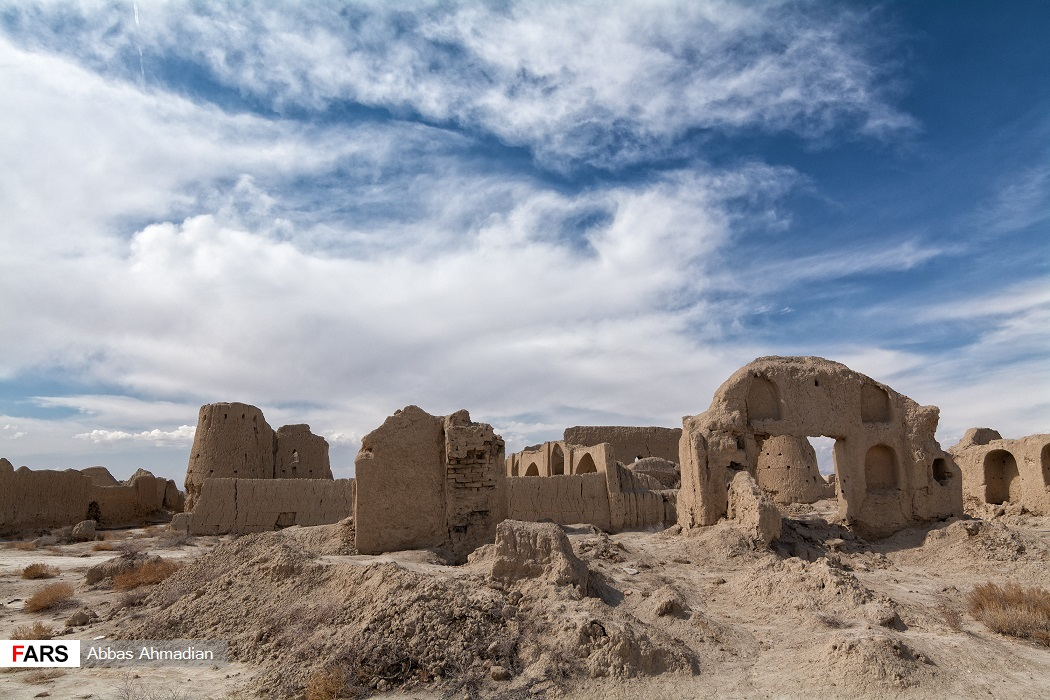
Shaman Castle of Dagman

Shaman (Persian: شامان, also Romanized as Shāmān) is a village in Howmeh Rural District, in the Central District of Damghan County, Semnan Province, Iran. At the 2006 census, its population was 27, in 6 families.
