= Mehdiabad, Damghan =

Mehdiabad مهدي آباد
- Village
- Location within Iran
- Coordinates: 36°08′09″N 54°25′44″E
- Country: Iran
- Province: Semnan
- County: Damghan
- Bakhsh: Central
- Rural District: Howmeh

Population (2006)
  - Total: 90
- Time zone: UTC+3:30 (IRST)
  - Summer (DST): UTC+4:30 (IRDT)

Mehdiabad (Persian: مهدي آباد, also Romanized as Mehdīābād) is a village in Howmeh Rural District, in the Central District of Damghan County, Semnan Province, Iran. At the 2006 census, its population was 90, in 20 families.
