= Zargarabad =

Zargarabad زرگر آباد
- Village
- Location within Iran
- Coordinates: 36°05′08″N 54°24′14″E
- Country: Iran
- Province: Semnan
- County: Damghan
- Bakhsh: Central
- Rural District: Howmeh

Population (2006)
  - Total: 46
- Time zone: UTC+3:30 (IRST)
  - Summer (DST): UTC+4:30 (IRDT)

Zargarabad (Persian: زرگر آباد, also Romanized as Zargarābād) is a village in Howmeh Rural District, in the Central District of Damghan County, Semnan Province, Iran. At the 2006 census, its population was 46, in 16 families.
