= Kushk-e Khaleseh-ye Bala =

Village in Semnan province, Iran

Kushk-e Khaleseh-ye Bala Persian: كوشك خالصه بالا
- Village
- Location within Iran
- Coordinates: 35°11′43″N 52°21′35″E
- Country: Iran
- Province: Semnan
- County: Garmsar
- District: Central
- Rural District: Lajran

Population (2016)
  - Total: 709
- Time zone: UTC+3:30 (IRST)

Kushk-e Khaleseh-ye Bala (Persian: كوشك خالصه بالا) (Note: Also romanized as Kūshk-e Khāleşeh Bālā and Kūshk-e Khāleseh-ye Bālā; also known as Kūshk-e Bālā) is a village in Lajran Rural District of the Central District in Garmsar County, Semnan province, Iran.

== Demographics ==
=== Population ===
At the time of the 2006 National Census, the village's population was 692 in 200 households. The following census in 2011 counted 729 people in 221 households. The 2016 census measured the population of the village as 709 people in 232 households.
