= Asb Keshan =

Asb Keshan اسبكشان
- Village
- Location within Iran
- Coordinates: 35°20′55″N 56°55′35″E
- Country: Iran
- Province: Semnan
- County: Shahrud
- Bakhsh: Beyarjomand
- Rural District: Kharturan

Population (2006)
  - Total: 31
- Time zone: UTC+3:30 (IRST)
  - Summer (DST): UTC+4:30 (IRDT)

Asb Keshan (Persian: اسبكشان, also Romanized as Asb Keshān, Asb Kashān, and Asb Koshān) is a village in Kharturan Rural District, Beyarjomand District, Shahrud County, Semnan Province, Iran. At the 2006 census, its population was 31, in 9 families.
