= Abdollahabad, Damghan =

Abdollahabad عبداله آباد
- Village
- Location within Iran
- Coordinates: 36.501°N 52.129°E
- Country: Iran
- Province: Semnan
- County: Damghan
- Bakhsh: Central
- Rural District: Howmeh

Population (2006)
  - Total: 22
- Time zone: UTC+3:30 (IRST)
  - Summer (DST): UTC+4:30 (IRDT)

Abdollahabad (Persian: عبداله آباد, also Romanized as ‘Abdollāhābād) is a village in Howmeh Rural District, in the Central District of Damghan County, Semnan Province, Iran. At the 2006 census, its population was 22, in 6 families.
