= Mohammadabad, Damghan =

Mohammadabad محمد آباد
- Village
- Location within Iran
- Coordinates: 36°00′46″N 54°18′08″E
- Country: Iran
- Province: Semnan
- County: Damghan
- Bakhsh: Central
- Rural District: Howmeh

Population (2006)
  - Total: 119
- Time zone: UTC+3:30 (IRST)
  - Summer (DST): UTC+4:30 (IRDT)

Mohammadabad (Persian: محمد آباد, also Romanized as Moḩammadābād) is a village in Howmeh Rural District, in the Central District of Damghan County, Semnan Province, Iran. At the 2006 census, its population was 119, in 31 families.
