= Cheshmeh-ye Sarhang =

Cheshmeh-ye Sarhang چشمه سرهنگ
- Village
- Location within Iran
- Coordinates: 35°28′45″N 53°24′58″E
- Country: Iran
- Province: Semnan
- County: Semnan
- Bakhsh: Central
- Rural District: Howmeh

Population (2006)
  - Total: 11
- Time zone: UTC+3:30 (IRST)
  - Summer (DST): UTC+4:30 (IRDT)

Cheshmeh-ye Sarhang (Persian: چشمه سرهنگ) is a village in Howmeh Rural District, in the Central District of Semnan County, Semnan Province, Iran. At the 2006 census, its population was 11, in 4 families.
