= Dez Gereh-ye Afshar-e Pain =

Dez Gereh-ye Afshar-e Pain دزگره افشارپايين
- Village
- Location within Iran
- Coordinates: 35°54′35″N 53°25′17″E
- Country: Iran
- Province: Semnan
- County: Mehdishahr
- Bakhsh: Shahmirzad
- Rural District: Chashm

Population (2016)
  - Total: 0
- Time zone: UTC+3:30 (IRST)

Dez Gereh-ye Afshar-e Pain (Persian: دزگره افشارپايين, also Romanized as Dez Gereh-ye Āfshār-e Pā’īn; also known as Dez Gereh) is a village in Chashm Rural District, Shahmirzad District, Mehdishahr County, Semnan Province, Iran.

At the 2006 census, its population was 79, in 27 families, when it was in the former Mehdishahr District of Semnan County. The following census in 2011 recorded a permanent population of zero, stating that villagers reside there from June to October, by which time the district had been separated from the county in the establishment of Mehdishahr County. The rural district was transferred to the new Shahmirzad District. The 2016 census measured a permanent population of zero.
