= Khaneh Goli =

Khaneh Goli خانه گلي
- Village
- Location within Iran
- Coordinates: 36°31′37″N 56°22′39″E
- Country: Iran
- Province: Semnan
- County: Meyami
- Bakhsh: Central
- Rural District: Kalat-e Hay-ye Sharqi

Population (2006)
  - Total: 36
- Time zone: UTC+3:30 (IRST)
  - Summer (DST): UTC+4:30 (IRDT)

Khaneh Goli (Persian: خانه گلي, also Romanized as Khāneh Golī) is a village in Kalat-e Hay-ye Sharqi Rural District, in the Central District of Meyami County, Semnan Province, Iran. At the 2006 census, its population was 36, in 10 families.
