= Mehdiabad, Meyami =

Mehdiabad مهدي آباد
- Village
- Location within Iran
- Coordinates: 36°31′17″N 55°49′35″E
- Country: Iran
- Province: Semnan
- County: Meyami
- Bakhsh: Central
- Rural District: Kalat-e Hay-ye Sharqi

Population (2006)
  - Total: 233
- Time zone: UTC+3:30 (IRST)
  - Summer (DST): UTC+4:30 (IRDT)

Mehdiabad (Persian: مهدي آباد, also Romanized as Mehdīābād) is a village in Kalat-e Hay-ye Sharqi Rural District, in the Central District of Meyami County, Semnan Province, Iran. At the 2006 census, its population was 233, in 54 families.
