= Hamyard =

Hamyard هميرد
- Village
- Location within Iran
- Coordinates: 35°43′58″N 53°50′13″E
- Country: Iran
- Province: Semnan
- County: Semnan
- Bakhsh: Central
- Rural District: Howmeh

Population (2006)
  - Total: 13
- Time zone: UTC+3:30 (IRST)
  - Summer (DST): UTC+4:30 (IRDT)

Hamyard (Persian: هميرد) is a village in Howmeh Rural District, in the Central District of Semnan County, Semnan Province, Iran. At the 2006 census, its population was 13, in 8 families.
