= Mojen =

City in Semnan province, Iran

Mojen Persian: مجن
- City
- Location within Iran
- Coordinates: 36°28′50″N 54°38′51″E
- Country: Iran
- Province: Semnan
- County: Shahrud
- District: Bastam

Population (2016)
  - Total: 5,932
- Time zone: UTC+3:30 (IRST)

Mojen (Persian: مجن) is a city in Bastam District of Shahrud County, Semnan province, Iran.

== Demographics ==
=== Population ===
At the time of the 2006 National Census, the city's population was 5,526 in 1,554 households. The following census in 2011 counted 5,456 people in 1,751 households. The 2016 census measured the population of the city as 5,932 people in 2,127 households.
