= Cooperative Farm 1 =

Cooperative Farm 1 مزرعه تعاوني انقلاب شماره 1
- Village/cooperative farm
- Country: Iran
- Province: Semnan
- County: Semnan
- Bakhsh: Central
- Rural District: Howmeh

Population (2006)
  - Total: 28
- Time zone: UTC+3:30 (IRST)
  - Summer (DST): UTC+4:30 (IRDT)

Cooperative Farm 1 (Persian: مزرعه تعاوني انقلاب شماره 1 – Mazra‘eh-ye Tʿāvanī Ānqolāb Shomāreh-ye Yek) is a village and cooperative farm in Howmeh Rural District, in the Central District of Semnan County, Semnan province, Iran. At the 2006 census, its population was 28, in 6 families.
