= Asaran =

Asaran آساران
- Village
- Location within Iran
- Coordinates: 35°52′00″N 53°23′00″E
- Country: Iran
- Province: Semnan
- County: Mehdishahr
- Bakhsh: Shahmirzad
- Rural District: Chashm

Population (2016)
  - Total: 0
- Time zone: UTC+3:30 (IRST)

Asaran (Persian: آساران, also Romanized as Āsārān; also known as Anāsarān) is a village in Chashm Rural District, Shahmirzad District, Mehdishahr County, Semnan Province, Iran.

At the time of the 2006 census, the village's population was 34 in 9 households, when it was in the former Mehdishahr District of Semnan County. The following census in 2011 recorded a permanent population of zero, stating that villagers reside there from May to September, by which time the district had been separated from the county in the establishment of Mehdishahr County. The rural district was transferred to the new Shahmirzad District. The 2016 census measured a permanent population of zero.
