= Mohammadabad Pol-e Abrisham =

Mohammadabad Pol-e Abrisham محمد آباد پل ابريشم
- Village
- Location within Iran
- Coordinates: 36°34′47″N 56°19′47″E
- Country: Iran
- Province: Semnan
- County: Meyami
- Bakhsh: Central
- Rural District: Kalat-e Hay-ye Sharqi

Population (2006)
  - Total: 181
- Time zone: UTC+3:30 (IRST)
  - Summer (DST): UTC+4:30 (IRDT)

Mohammadabad Pol-e Abrisham (Persian: محمد آباد پل ابريشم, also Romanized as Moḩammadābād Pol-e Abrīsham; also known as Moḩammadābād) is a village in Kalat-e Hay-ye Sharqi Rural District, in the Central District of Meyami County, Semnan Province, Iran. At the 2006 census, its population was 181, in 43 families.
