= Sharifabad, Meyami =

Sharifabad شريف آباد
- Village
- Location within Iran
- Coordinates: 36°35′36″N 55°52′43″E
- Country: Iran
- Province: Semnan
- County: Meyami
- Bakhsh: Central
- Rural District: Kalat-e Hay-ye Sharqi

Population (2006)
  - Total: 210
- Time zone: UTC+3:30 (IRST)
  - Summer (DST): UTC+4:30 (IRDT)

Sharifabad (Persian: شريف آباد, also Romanized as Sharīfābād) is a village in the Kalat-e Hay-ye Sharqi Rural District in the Central District of Meyami County, Semnan Province, Iran. According to the 2006 census, its population was 210 people from 47 families.
