= Puyeh =

Puyeh پويه
- Village
- Location within Iran
- Coordinates: 36°38′36″N 55°50′46″E
- Country: Iran
- Province: Semnan
- County: Meyami
- Bakhsh: Central
- Rural District: Kalat-e Hay-ye Sharqi

Population (2006)
  - Total: 246
- Time zone: UTC+3:30 (IRST)
  - Summer (DST): UTC+4:30 (IRDT)

Puyeh (Persian: پويه, also Romanized as Pūyeh) is a village in Kalat-e Hay-ye Sharqi Rural District, in the Central District of Meyami County, Semnan Province, Iran. At the 2006 census, its population was 246, in 59 families.
