= Cooperative Farm 2 =

Cooperative Farm 2 مزرعه تعاوني انقلاب شماره 2
- Village/cooperative farm
- Country: Iran
- Province: Semnan
- County: Semnan
- Bakhsh: Central
- Rural District: Howmeh

Population (2006)
  - Total: 56
- Time zone: UTC+3:30 (IRST)
  - Summer (DST): UTC+4:30 (IRDT)

Cooperative Farm 2 (Persian: مزرعه تعاوني انقلاب شماره 2 – Mazra‘eh-ye Tʿāvanī Ānqolāb Shomāreh-ye Do) is a village and cooperative farm in Howmeh Rural District, in the Central District of Semnan County, Semnan province, Iran. At the 2006 census, its population was 56, in 18 families.
