= Amiriyeh =

City in Semnan province, Iran

Amiriyeh Persian: اميريه
- City
- Location within Iran
- Coordinates: 36°01′37″N 54°08′26″E
- Country: Iran
- Province: Semnan
- County: Damghan
- District: Amirabad
- Established as a city: 1996

Population (2016)
  - Total: 3,561
- Time zone: UTC+3:30 (IRST)

Amiriyeh (Persian: اميريه) (Note: Also romanized as Amīrīyeh; formerly the village of Amirabad (امير آباد),) is a city in, and the capital of, Amirabad District in Damghan County, Semnan province, Iran. The village of Amirabad was converted to the city of Amiriyeh in 1996.

== Demographics ==
=== Population ===
At the time of the 2006 National Census, the city's population was 1,541 in 455 households. The following census in 2011 counted 2,402 people in 622 households. The 2016 census measured the population of the city as 3,561 people in 1,152 households.
