= Zereshkuh =

Zereshkuh زرشكوه
- Village
- Country: Iran
- Province: Semnan
- County: Semnan
- Bakhsh: Central
- Rural District: Howmeh

Population (2006)
  - Total: 11
- Time zone: UTC+3:30 (IRST)
  - Summer (DST): UTC+4:30 (IRDT)

Zereshkuh (Persian: زرشكوه, also Romanized as Zereshḵūh) is a village in Howmeh Rural District, in the Central District of Semnan County, Semnan Province, Iran. At the 2006 census, its population was 11, in four families.
