= Dasht Gonbad =

Dasht Gonbad دشت گنبد
- Village
- Location within Iran
- Coordinates: 35°47′56″N 53°12′31″E
- Country: Iran
- Province: Semnan
- County: Mehdishahr
- Bakhsh: Shahmirzad
- Rural District: Chashm

Population (2016)
  - Total: 0
- Time zone: UTC+3:30 (IRST)

Dasht Gonbad (Persian: دشت گنبد, also Romanized as Dasht-e Gonbad) is a village in Chashm Rural District, Shahmirzad District, Mehdishahr County, Semnan Province, Iran.

At the time of the 2006 census, the village's population was 45 in 13 households, when it was in the former Mehdishahr District of Semnan County. The following census in 2011 recorded less than 4 permanent households, by which time the district had been separated from the county in the establishment of Mehdishahr County. The rural district was transferred to the new Shahmirzad District. The 2016 census measured a permanent population of zero.
