= Howmeh Rural District (Garmsar County) =

Rural district in Semnan province, Iran

Howmeh Rural District Persian: دهستان حومه
- Rural District
- Location within Iran
- Coordinates: 34°50′N 52°22′E
- Country: Iran
- Province: Semnan
- County: Garmsar
- District: Central
- Established: 1987
- Capital: Kardovan

Population (2016)
  - Total: 4,072
- Time zone: UTC+3:30 (IRST)

Howmeh Rural District (Persian: دهستان حومه) is in the Central District of Garmsar County, Semnan province, Iran. Its capital is the village of Kardovan.

== Demographics ==
=== Population ===
At the time of the 2006 National Census, the rural district's population was 3,285 in 918 households. There were 3,554 inhabitants in 1,091 households at the following census of 2011. The 2016 census measured the population of the rural district as 4,072 in 1,435 households. The most populous of its 46 villages was Shah Sefid, with 586 people.

=== Other villages in the rural district ===
- Fand
- Malijan-e Bala
- Mohammadabad
- Qatul
- Reshmeh
- Rikan
