= Lajran Rural District =

Rural district in Semnan province, Iran

Lajran Rural District Persian: دهستان لجران
- Rural District
- Location within Iran
- Coordinates: 34°55′N 52°11′E
- Country: Iran
- Province: Semnan
- County: Garmsar
- District: Central
- Established: 1991
- Capital: Lajran

Population (2016)
  - Total: 7,514
- Time zone: UTC+3:30 (IRST)

Lajran Rural District (Persian: دهستان لجران) is in the Central District of Garmsar County, Semnan province, Iran. Its capital is the village of Lajran.

== Demographics ==
=== Population ===
At the time of the 2006 National Census, the rural district's population was 6,895 in 1,845 households. There were 6,353 inhabitants in 1,893 households at the following census of 2011. The 2016 census measured the population of the rural district as 7,514 in 2,258 households. The most populous of its 100 villages was Karand, with 1,273 people.

=== Other villages in the rural district ===
- Farvar
- Ghiasabad
- Hajjiabad-e Atashgah
- Kushk-e Khaleseh-ye Bala
- Nowdeh-e Arbabi
- Shah Bolagh-e Bala
