= Qohab-e Rastaq Rural District =

Rural district in Semnan province, Iran

Qohab-e Rastaq Rural District Persian: دهستان قهاب رستاق
- Rural District
- Location within Iran
- Coordinates: 35°11′N 54°23′E
- Country: Iran
- Province: Semnan
- County: Damghan
- District: Amirabad
- Established: 1987
- Capital: Forat

Population (2016)
  - Total: 5,235
- Time zone: UTC+3:30 (IRST)

Qohab-e Rastaq Rural District (Persian: دهستان قهاب رستاق) is in Amirabad District of Damghan County, Semnan province, Iran. Its capital is the village of Forat.

== Demographics ==
=== Population ===
At the time of the 2006 National Census, the rural district's population was 4,363 in 1,189 households. There were 4,662 inhabitants in 1,317 households at the following census of 2011. The 2016 census measured the population of the rural district as 5,235 in 1,676 households. The most populous of its 139 villages was Hasanabad, with 1,067 people.

=== Other villages in the rural district ===
- Alian
- Kelu
- Khurzan
- Kuh Zar
- Rashm
- Shimi
