= Kharqan Rural District (Shahrud County) =

Rural district in Semnan province, Iran

Kharqan Rural District Persian: دهستان خرقان
- Rural District
- Location within Iran
- Coordinates: 36°35′N 54°55′E
- Country: Iran
- Province: Semnan
- County: Shahrud
- District: Bastam
- Established: 1987
- Capital: Qaleh Now-e Kharaqan

Population (2016)
  - Total: 18,877
- Time zone: UTC+3:30 (IRST)

Kharqan Rural District (Persian: دهستان خرقان) (Note: Formerly Bastam Rural District (دهستان بسطام)) is in Bastam District of Shahrud County, Semnan province, Iran. Its capital is the village of Qaleh Now-e Kharaqan.

== Demographics ==
=== Population ===
At the time of the 2006 National Census, the rural district's population was 15,936 in 4,406 households. There were 16,308 inhabitants in 5,148 households at the following census of 2011. The 2016 census measured the population of the rural district as 18,877 in 6,438 households. The most populous of its 120 villages was Miqan, with 4,264 people.

=== Other villages in the rural district ===
- Abarsij
- Abr
- Kolamu
- Mianabad
- Qaleh-ye Aqa

== Notable people ==
- Abu al-Hassan al-Kharaqani
