= Amirabad District =

District in Semnan province, Iran

Amirabad District Persian: بخش امیرآباد
- District
- Location within Iran
- Coordinates: 35°14′N 54°23′E
- Country: Iran
- Province: Semnan
- County: Damghan
- Capital: Amiriyeh

Population (2016)
  - Total: 12,296
- Time zone: UTC+3:30 (IRST)

Amirabad District (Persian: بخش امیرآباد) is in Damghan County, Semnan province, Iran. Its capital is the city of Amiriyeh. (Note: Formerly the village of Amirabad)

== Demographics ==
=== Population ===
At the time of the 2006 National Census, the district's population was 9,026 in 2,717 households. The following census in 2011 counted 10,413 people in 3,150 households. The 2016 census measured the population of the district as 12,296 inhabitants in 4,122 households.

=== Administrative divisions ===
Amirabad District Population
Administrative Divisions	2006	2011	2016
Qohab-e Rastaq RD	4,363	4,662	5,235
Qohab-e Sarsar RD	1,559	1,429	1,863
Tuyehdarvar RD	1,563	1,920	1,637
Amiriyeh (city)	1,541	2,402	3,561
Total	9,026	10,413	12,296
RD = Rural District
