= Beyarjomand District =

District in Semnan province, Iran

Beyarjomand District Persian: بخش بیارجمند
- District
- Location within Iran
- Coordinates: 35°19′N 56°16′E
- Country: Iran
- Province: Semnan
- County: Shahrud
- Capital: Beyarjomand

Population (2016)
  - Total: 7,613
- Time zone: UTC+3:30 (IRST)

Beyarjomand District (Persian: بخش بیارجمند) is in Shahrud County, Semnan province, Iran. Its capital is the city of Beyarjomand.

== Demographics ==
=== Population ===
At the time of the 2006 National Census, the district's population was 7,885 in 2,428 households. The following census in 2011 counted 7,145 people in 2,369 households. The 2016 census measured the population of the district as 7,613 inhabitants in 2,734 households.

=== Administrative divisions ===
Beyarjomand District Population
Administrative Divisions	2006	2011	2016
Beyarjomand RD	2,023	1,643	2,018
Kharturan RD	3,616	3,061	3,067
Beyarjomand (city)	2,246	2,441	2,528
Total	7,885	7,145	7,613
RD = Rural District
