= Bastam District =

District in Semnan province, Iran

Bastam District Persian: بخش بسطام
- District
- Location within Iran
- Coordinates: 36°39′N 55°07′E
- Country: Iran
- Province: Semnan
- County: Shahrud
- Capital: Bastam

Population (2016)
  - Total: 44,052
- Time zone: UTC+3:30 (IRST)

Bastam District (Persian: بخش بسطام) is in Shahrud County, Semnan province, Iran. Its capital is the city of Bastam.

== Demographics ==
=== Population ===
At the time of the 2006 National Census, the district's population was 37,635 in 10,380 households. The following census in 2011 counted 39,101 people in 11,762 households. The 2016 census measured the population of the district as 44,052 inhabitants in 14,295 households.

=== Administrative divisions ===
Bastam District Population
Administrative Divisions	2006	2011	2016
Kalateh Hay-ye Gharbi RD	3,456	4,568	4,983
Kharqan RD (Note: Formerly Bastam Rural District)	15,936	16,308	18,877
Bastam (city)	7,382	7,712	8,609
Kalateh-ye Khij (city)	5,335	5,057	5,651
Mojen (city)	5,526	5,456	5,932
Total	37,635	39,101	44,052
RD = Rural District
