= Damghan County =

County in Semnan province, Iran

Damghan County Persian: شهرستان دامغان
- County
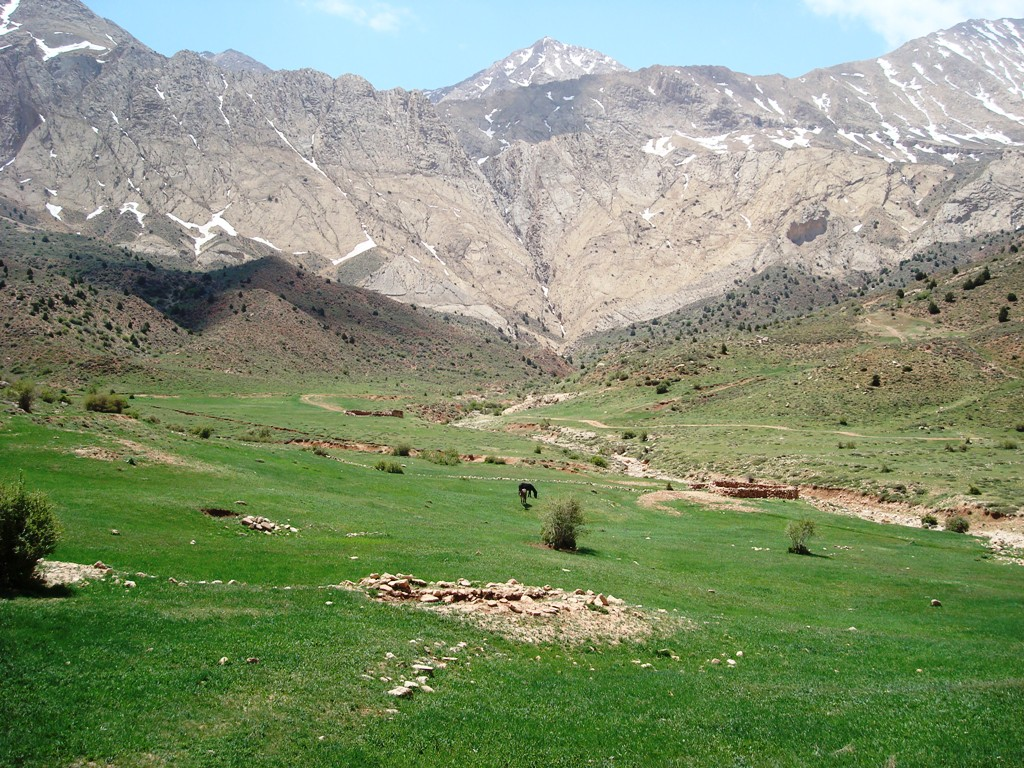

- Location of Damghan County in Semnan Province (center, yellow)

- Location of Semnan province in Iran
- Coordinates: 35°23′N 54°24′E
- Country: Iran
- Province: Semnan
- Capital: Damghan
- Districts: Central, Amirabad

Population (2016)
  - Total: 94,190
- Time zone: UTC+3:30 (IRST)

Damghan County (Persian: شهرستان دامغان) is in Semnan province, Iran. Its capital is the city of Damghan.

== History ==
The area suffered damage in the 856 Damghan earthquake.

The village of Kalateh was converted to a city in 2011.

== Demographics ==
=== Population ===
At the time of the 2006 National Census, the county's population was 81,993 in 23,020 households. The following census in 2011 counted 86,908 people in 25,554 households. The 2016 census measured the population of the county as 94,190 in 30,296 households.

=== Administrative divisions ===
Damghan County's population history and administrative structure over three consecutive censuses are shown in the following table.

Damghan County Population
Administrative Divisions	2006	2011	2016
Central District	72,967	76,495	81,894
Damankuh RD	4,278	4,045	4,590
Howmeh RD	4,318	3,854	5,162
Rudbar RD	4,536	6,052	2,778
Damghan (city)	57,331	58,770	59,106
Dibaj (city)	2,504	3,774	5,647
Kalateh (city)			4,611
Amirabad District	9,026	10,413	12,296
Qohab-e Rastaq RD	4,363	4,662	5,235
Qohab-e Sarsar RD	1,559	1,429	1,863
Tuyehdarvar RD	1,563	1,920	1,637
Amiriyeh (city) (Note: Formerly the village of Amirabad)	1,541	2,402	3,561
Total	81,993	86,908	94,190
RD = Rural District

== Geography ==
The Ali Spring (Cheshmeh-ye Ali) is in Damghan County (not be confused with the Cheshmeh-ye Ali in Ray, southern Tehran). Amirabad District forms the major part of the county. The three cities are Damghan, Dibaj and Amiriyeh.

Other important villages in the county are: Mehmandust, Naimabad, Tazareh, Tuyeh, and Darvar, Qusheh, Hasanabad, and Rashm.

== Transportation ==
Main Tehran-Mashhad railway is 5 km south of Damghan. Damghan is alongside of Tehran-Mashhad Highway. From south there is main road to Isfahan and Yazd, and northward from Ali Spring (Cheshmeh Ali) & Tuyeh Darvar to Sari and through Dibaj to Behshahr & Gorgan.

== Tourist attractions ==
Damghan city itself has many ancient and historical places. However outside the city also there are some attractions like:

- Toghrol Tower in Mehmandust
- Ali Spring (Cheshmeh Ali) and its fort
- Dibaj, Sarcheshmeh and Imamzadeh
- Abbasi Carvansaray
- Gerd Kuh
- Mansurkuh and Mehrnegar
- Cheshmeh & Tom of Baba Ali in north of Naim Abad
- Dam on Damghan River
- Dasht-e Kavir

== See also ==
- Amiriyeh
- Battle of Damghan (1447)
- Battle of Damghan (1729)
- Damghan
- Dibaj
- Hecatompylos (Shahr-e Qumis)
- Semnan Province

== See also ==
Media related to Damghan County at Wikimedia Commons
