= Central District (Garmsar County) =

District in Semnan province, Iran

Central District (Garmsar County) Persian: بخش مرکزی شهرستان گرمسار
- District
- Location within Iran
- Coordinates: 34°55′N 52°11′E
- Country: Iran
- Province: Semnan
- County: Garmsar
- Capital: Garmsar

Population (2016)
  - Total: 60,258
- Time zone: UTC+3:30 (IRST)

The Central District of Garmsar County (Persian: بخش مرکزی شهرستان گرمسار) is in Semnan province, Iran. Its capital is the city of Garmsar.

== Demographics ==
=== Population ===
At the time of the 2006 National Census, the district's population was 49,071 in 13,714 households. The following census in 2011 counted 50,892 people in 15,523 households. The 2016 census measured the population of the district as 60,258 inhabitants in 19,768 households.

=== Administrative divisions ===
Central District (Garmsar County) Population
| Administrative Divisions | 2006 | 2011 | 2016 |
|---|---|---|---|
| Howmeh RD | 3,285 | 3,554 | 4,072 |
| Lajran RD | 6,895 | 6,353 | 7,514 |
| Garmsar (city) | 38,891 | 40,985 | 48,672 |
| Total | 49,071 | 50,892 | 60,258 |
RD = Rural District
