= Garmsar County =

County in Semnan province, Iran

Garmsar County Persian: شهرستان گرمسار
- County
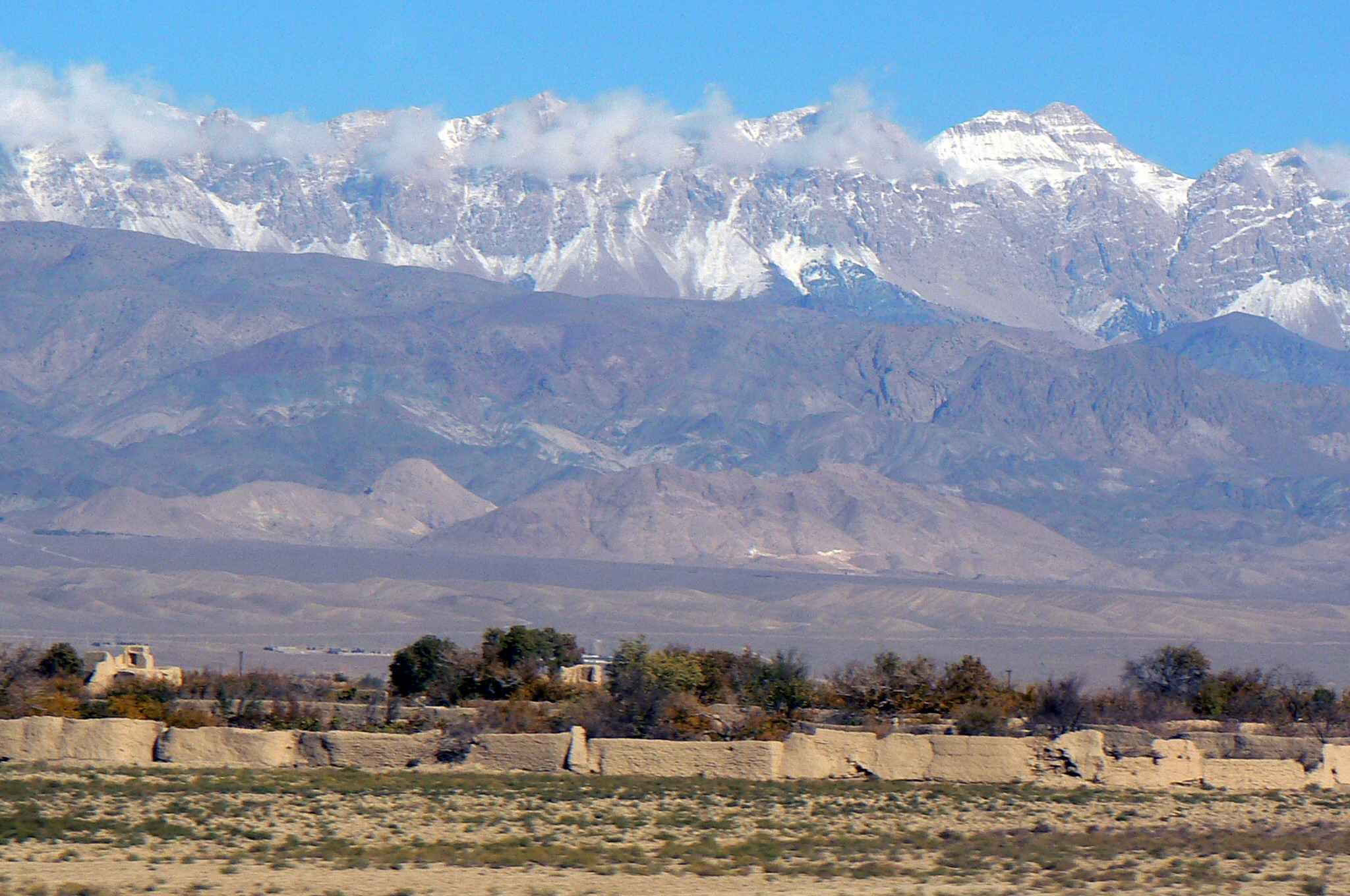
- Alborz Mountains

- Location of Garmsar County in Semnan Province (left, yellow)

- Location of Semnan province in Iran
- Coordinates: 35°00′N 52°11′E
- Country: Iran
- Province: Semnan
- Capital: Garmsar
- Districts: Central, Eyvanki

Population (2016)
  - Total: 77,421
- Time zone: UTC+3:30 (IRST)

Garmsar County (Persian: شهرستان گرمسار) is in Semnan province, Iran. Its capital is the city of Garmsar.

== History ==
In 2011, Aradan District was separated from the county in the establishment of Aradan County.

== Demographics ==
=== Languages ===
The main languages of the county are Persian (Central District) and Tati (Eyvanki District).

=== Population ===
At the time of the 2006 National Census, the county's population was 77,676 in 21,706 households. The following census in 2011 counted 81,324 people in 24,858 households. The 2016 census measured the population of the county as 77,421 in 25,585 households.

=== Administrative divisions ===
Garmsar County's population history and administrative structure over three consecutive censuses are shown in the following table.

Garmsar County Population
Administrative Divisions	2006	2011	2016
Central District	49,071	50,892	60,258
Howmeh RD	3,285	3,554	4,072
Lajran RD	6,895	6,353	7,514
Garmsar (city)	38,891	40,985	48,672
Aradan District (Note: Transferred to Aradan County)	15,418	15,575	
Kohanabad RD	4,745	3,768	
Yateri RD	5,714	6,181	
Aradan (city)	4,959	5,626	
Eyvanki District	13,187	14,857	17,163
Eyvanki RD	2,791	2,862	3,645
Eyvanki (city)	10,396	11,995	13,518
Total	77,676	81,324	77,421
RD = Rural District

== See also ==
Media related to Garmsar County at Wikimedia Commons
