= Shahrud County =

County in Semnan province, Iran

Shahrud County Persian: شهرستان شاهرود
- County
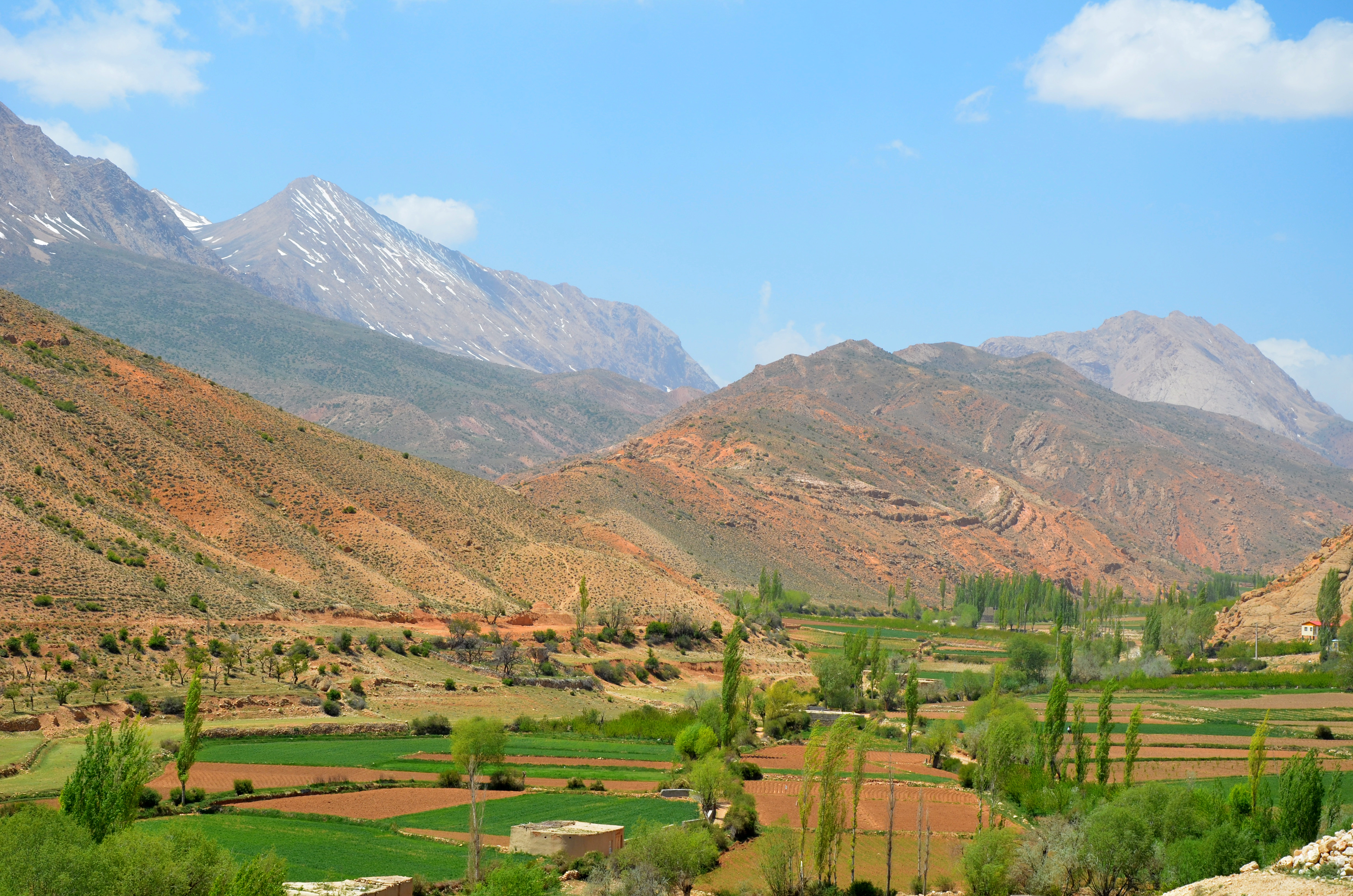
- Landscape near Mojen

- Location of Shahrud County in Semnan province (right, green)

- Location of Semnan province in Iran
- Coordinates: 35°35′N 55°48′E
- Country: Iran
- Province: Semnan
- Capital: Shahrud
- Districts: Central, Bastam, Beyarjomand

Population (2016)
  - Total: 218,628
- Time zone: UTC+3:30 (IRST)

Shahrud County (Persian: شهرستان شاهرود) is in Semnan province, Iran. Its capital is the city of Shahrud.

== History ==
In 2011, Meyami District was separated from the county in the establishment of Meyami County. The village of Ruyan was converted to a city as Rudiyan in 2016, and was renamed Ruyan again in 2021.

== Demographics ==
=== Population ===
At the time of the 2006 census, the county's population was 225,007 in 62,196 households. The following census in 2011 counted 238,830 people in 70,598 households. The 2016 census measured the population of the county as 218,628 in 69,723 households.

=== Administrative divisions ===
Shahrud County's population history and administrative structure over three consecutive censuses are shown in the following table.

Shahrud County Population
Administrative Divisions	2006	2011	2016
Central District	142,663	155,326	166,963
Dehmolla RD	2,197	1,797	2,317
Howmeh RD	10,008	9,555	7,366
Torud RD	3,542	3,500	3,381
Ruyan (city) (Note: Became the city of Rudiyan after the 2016 census; renamed Ruyan again)			3,770
Shahrud (city)	126,916	140,474	150,129
Bastam District	37,635	39,101	44,052
Kalateh Hay-ye Gharbi RD	3,456	4,568	4,983
Kharqan RD (Note: Formerly Bastam Rural District)	15,936	16,308	18,877
Bastam (city)	7,382	7,712	8,609
Kalateh-ye Khij (city)	5,335	5,057	5,651
Mojen (city)	5,526	5,456	5,932
Beyarjomand District	7,885	7,145	7,613
Beyarjomand RD	2,023	1,643	2,018
Kharturan RD	3,616	3,061	3,067
Beyarjomand (city)	2,246	2,441	2,528
Meyami District (Note: Transferred to Meyami County)	36,824	37,258	
Farumad RD	3,472	2,575	
Kalateh Hay-ye Sharqi RD	6,420	5,837	
Meyami RD	6,524	5,358	
Nardin RD	5,514	6,630	
Rezvan RD (Note: Formerly Nardin Rural District)	10,837	12,296	
Meyami (city)	4,057	4,562	
Total	225,007	238,830	218,628
RD = Rural District

== Notable people ==
- Bayazid Bastami, 9th century Sufi
- Abu al-Hassan al-Kharaqani (963-1033), Sufi
- Abbas Foroughi Bastami (1798-1857), poet

== See also ==
Media related to Shahrud County at Wikimedia Commons
