= Kalateh-ye Molla =

Kalateh-ye Molla (Persian: كلاته ملا) may refer to:

- Kalateh-ye Molla, Gonabad, Razavi Khorasan Province
- Kalateh-ye Molla, Zaveh, Razavi Khorasan Province
- Kalateh-ye Molla, Damghan, Semnan Province
- Kalateh-ye Molla, Meyami, Semnan Province
- Kalateh-ye Molla, alternate name of Dehmolla, Semnan Province
- Kalateh-ye Molla, South Khorasan

== See also ==
- Kalateh-ye Molla Aziz
- Kalateh-ye Molla Gholamhoseyn
- Kalateh-ye Molla Khodadad
- Kalateh-ye Molla Mohammad
- Kalateh-ye Molla Veys
