= Moghan =

Moghan (Persian: مغان) may refer to:

- Moghan, Ardebil
- Moghan, Hormozgan
- Moghan, Isfahan
- Moghan, Chenaran, Razavi Khorasan Province
- Moghan, Kashmar, Razavi Khorasan Province
- Moghan, Torqabeh and Shandiz, Razavi Khorasan Province
- Moghan, Semnan

== See also ==
- Moghan, County Tyrone, a townland in County Tyrone, Northern Ireland
