= Satveh =

Village in Semnan province, Iran

Satveh Persian: سطوه
- Village
- Location within Iran
- Coordinates: 35°16′16″N 54°41′30″E
- Country: Iran
- Province: Semnan
- County: Shahrud
- District: Central
- Rural District: Torud

Population (2016)
  - Total: 996
- Time zone: UTC+3:30 (IRST)

Satveh (Persian: سطوه) (Note: Also romanized as Saţveh; also known as Sadfeh, Satfar, and Satva) is a village in Torud Rural District of the Central District in Shahrud County, Semnan province, Iran.

== Demographics ==
=== Population ===
At the time of the 2006 National Census, the village's population was 1,009 in 219 households. The following census in 2011 counted 1,071 people in 252 households. The 2016 census measured the population of the village as 996 people in 255 households.

== See also ==
- Mehdiabad, Shahrud
