= Yunesabad =

Yunesabad or Yunosabad (Persian: يونس اباد) may refer to:

- Yunesabad, Kurdistan
- Yunesabad, Qazvin
- Yunesabad, Semnan
- Yunesabad, Sistan and Baluchestan
