= Farahabad, Semnan =

Village in Semnan province, Iran

Farahabad Persian: فرح آباد
- Village
- Location within Iran
- Coordinates: 36°18′36″N 54°54′21″E
- Country: Iran
- Province: Semnan
- County: Shahrud
- District: Central
- Rural District: Howmeh

Population (2016)
  - Total: 48
- Time zone: UTC+3:30 (IRST)

Farahabad (Persian: فرح آباد) (Note: Also romanized as Faraḩābād) is a village in Howmeh Rural District of the Central District in Shahrud County, Semnan province, Iran.

== Demographics ==
=== Population ===
At the time of the 2006 National Census, the village's population was 143 in 37 households. The following census in 2011 counted 101 people in 32 households. The 2016 census measured the population of the village as 48 people in 17 households.
