= Dizaj, Semnan =

Village in Semnan province, Iran

Dizaj Persian: ديزج
- Village
- Location within Iran
- Coordinates: 36°21′40″N 55°01′02″E
- Country: Iran
- Province: Semnan
- County: Shahrud
- District: Central
- Rural District: Howmeh

Population (2016)
  - Total: 1,838
- Time zone: UTC+3:30 (IRST)

Dizaj (Persian: ديزج) (Note: Also romanized as Dīzaj and Dīzej; also known as Deh Sīb, Deh-e Sīq, Deh-i-Siq, and Dezej) is a village in Howmeh Rural District of the Central District in Shahrud County, Semnan province, Iran.

== Demographics ==
=== Population ===
At the time of the 2006 National Census, the village's population was 1,879 in 554 households. The following census in 2011 counted 1,739 people in 561 households. The 2016 census measured the population of the village as 1,838 people in 607 households, the most populous in its rural district.
