= Qaleh-ye Azodi =

Village in Semnan province, Iran

Qaleh-ye Azodi Persian: قلعه عضدي
- Village
- Location within Iran
- Country: Iran
- Province: Semnan
- County: Shahrud
- District: Central
- Rural District: Howmeh

Population (2016)
  - Total: 53
- Time zone: UTC+3:30 (IRST)

Qaleh-ye Azodi (Persian: قلعه عضدي) (Note: Also romanized as Qal‘eh-ye ‘Aẕodī) is a village in Howmeh Rural District of the Central District in Shahrud County, Semnan province, Iran.

== Demographics ==
=== Population ===
At the time of the 2006 National Census, the village's population was 43 in 11 households. The following census in 2011 counted 23 people in six households. The 2016 census measured the population of the village as 53 people in 17 households.
