= Torud =

Torud (Persian: طرود) may refer to:

- Torud, Semnan
- Torud, Tehran
- Torud Rural District, Semnan Province

== See also ==
- 1953 Torud earthquake, which struck Semnan Province
