= Jafarabad, Semnan =

Village in Semnan province, Iran

Jafarabad Persian: جعفر آباد
- Village
- Location within Iran
- Coordinates: 36°20′58″N 55°00′38″E
- Country: Iran
- Province: Semnan
- County: Shahrud
- District: Central
- Rural District: Howmeh

Population (2016)
  - Total: 103
- Time zone: UTC+3:30 (IRST)

Jafarabad (Persian: جعفر آباد) (Note: Also romanized as Ja‘farābād) is a village in Howmeh Rural District of the Central District in Shahrud County, Semnan province, Iran.

== Demographics ==
=== Population ===
At the time of the 2006 National Census, the village's population was 80 in 28 households. The following census in 2011 counted 66 people in 29 households. The 2016 census measured the population of the village as 103 people in 38 households.
