= Kalateh-ye Khan, Semnan =

Village in Semnan province, Iran

Kalateh-ye Khan Persian: كلاته خان
- Village
- Location within Iran
- Coordinates: 36°17′59″N 54°51′59″E
- Country: Iran
- Province: Semnan
- County: Shahrud
- District: Central
- Rural District: Dehmolla

Population (2016)
  - Total: 40
- Time zone: UTC+3:30 (IRST)

Kalateh-ye Khan (Persian: كلاته خان) (Note: Also romanized as Kalāteh Khān and Kalāteh-ye Khān; also known as Kalāt Khān and Qalāteh-ye Khān) is a village in Dehmolla Rural District of the Central District in Shahrud County, Semnan province, Iran.

== Demographics ==
=== Population ===
At the time of the 2006 National Census, the village's population was 160 in 24 households. The following census in 2011 counted 74 people in 34 households. The 2016 census measured the population of the village as 40 people in 14 households.
