= Tall, Semnan =

Village in Semnan province, Iran

Tall Persian: تل
- Village
- Location within Iran
- Coordinates: 36°18′26″N 54°57′38″E
- Country: Iran
- Province: Semnan
- County: Shahrud
- District: Central
- Rural District: Howmeh

Population (2016)
  - Total: 88
- Time zone: UTC+3:30 (IRST)

Tall (Persian: تل) (Note: Also romanized as Tal) is a village in Howmeh Rural District of the Central District in Shahrud County, Semnan province, Iran.

== Demographics ==
=== Population ===
At the time of the 2006 National Census, the village's population was 193 in 69 households. The following census in 2011 counted 81 people in 29 households. The 2016 census measured the population of the village as 88 people in 33 households.
