= Aliabad, Dehmolla =

Village in Semnan province, Iran

Aliabad Persian: علي آباد
- Village
- Location within Iran
- Coordinates: 36°15′40″N 54°48′46″E
- Country: Iran
- Province: Semnan
- County: Shahrud
- District: Central
- Rural District: Dehmolla

Population (2016)
  - Total: 265
- Time zone: UTC+3:30 (IRST)

Aliabad (Persian: علی‌آباد) (Note: Also romanized as ‘Alīābād) is a village in Dehmolla Rural District of the Central District in Shahrud County, Semnan province, Iran.

== Demographics ==
=== Population ===
At the time of the 2006 National Census, the village's population was 166 in 64 households. The following census in 2011 counted 127 people in 52 households. The 2016 census measured the population of the village as 265 people in 95 households.
