= Qaleh Hajji =

Village in Semnan province, Iran

Qaleh Hajji Persian: قلعه حاجي
- Village
- Location within Iran
- Coordinates: 36°15′58″N 54°44′47″E
- Country: Iran
- Province: Semnan
- County: Shahrud
- District: Central
- Rural District: Dehmolla

Population (2016)
  - Total: 182
- Time zone: UTC+3:30 (IRST)

Qaleh Hajji (Persian: قلعه حاجي) (Note: Also romanized as Qal‘eh Ḩājjī) is a village in Dehmolla Rural District of the Central District in Shahrud County, Semnan province, Iran.

== Demographics ==
=== Population ===
At the time of the 2006 National Census, the village's population was 160 in 53 households. The following census in 2011 counted 178 people in 68 households. The 2016 census measured the population of the village as 182 people in 82 households.
