= Sar Takht, Semnan =

Village in Semnan province, Iran

Sar Takht Persian: سرتخت
- Village
- Location within Iran
- Coordinates: 35°24′51″N 54°47′03″E
- Country: Iran
- Province: Semnan
- County: Shahrud
- District: Central
- Rural District: Torud

Population (2016)
  - Total: 117
- Time zone: UTC+3:30 (IRST)

Sar Takht (Persian: سرتخت) is a village in Torud Rural District of the Central District in Shahrud County, Semnan province, Iran.

== Demographics ==
=== Population ===
At the time of the 2006 National Census, the village's population was 83 in 17 households. The following census in 2011 counted 77 people in 15 households. The 2016 census measured the population of the village as 117 people in 31 households.
