= Bedasht =

Village in Semnan province, Iran

Bedasht Persian: بدشت
- Village
- Location within Iran
- Coordinates: 36°25′17″N 55°03′10″E
- Country: Iran
- Province: Semnan
- County: Shahrud
- District: Central
- Rural District: Howmeh

Population (2016)
  - Total: 288
- Time zone: UTC+3:30 (IRST)

Bedasht (Persian: بدشت) (Note: Also romanized as Badasht) is a village in Howmeh Rural District of the Central District in Shahrud County, Semnan province, Iran.

== Demographics ==
=== Population ===
At the time of the 2006 National Census, the village's population was 466 in 143 households. The following census in 2011 counted 268 people in 99 households. The 2016 census measured the population of the village as 288 people in 105 households.
