= Hoseynabad-e Saghar =

Village in Semnan province, Iran

Hoseynabad-e Saghar Persian: حسين آباد ساغر
- Village
- Location within Iran
- Coordinates: 36°19′41″N 55°00′38″E
- Country: Iran
- Province: Semnan
- County: Shahrud
- District: Central
- Rural District: Howmeh

Population (2016)
  - Total: 51
- Time zone: UTC+3:30 (IRST)

Hoseynabad-e Saghar (Persian: حسين آباد ساغر) (Note: Also romanized as Ḩoseynābād-e Sāghar; also known as Ḩoseynābād Sāgharī) is a village in Howmeh Rural District of the Central District in Shahrud County, Semnan province, Iran.

== Demographics ==
=== Population ===
At the time of the 2006 National Census, the village's population was 53 in 14 households. The following census in 2011 counted 83 people in 30 households. The 2016 census measured the population of the village as 51 people in 16 households.
