= Touroud =

Touroud can refer to

- The Dervish Touroud, a character in Osman's Dream
- Touroud or Torud, village in Iran
