= Qaleh Now-e Khaleseh, Semnan =

Village in Semnan province, Iran

Qaleh Now-e Khaleseh Persian: قلعه نوخالصه
- Village
- Location within Iran
- Coordinates: 36°19′40″N 54°57′05″E
- Country: Iran
- Province: Semnan
- County: Shahrud
- District: Central
- Rural District: Howmeh

Population (2016)
  - Total: 273
- Time zone: UTC+3:30 (IRST)

Qaleh Now-e Khaleseh (Persian: قلعه نوخالصه) (Note: Also romanized as Qal‘eh Now-e Khāleşeh) is a village in Howmeh Rural District of the Central District in Shahrud County, Semnan province, Iran.

== Demographics ==
=== Population ===
At the time of the 2006 National Census, the village's population was 267 in 77 households. The following census in 2011 counted 185 people in 42 households. The 2016 census measured the population of the village as 273 people in 83 households.
