= Ardian, Iran =

Village in Semnan province, Iran

Ardian Persian: ارديان
- Village
- Location within Iran
- Coordinates: 36°22′43″N 54°57′58″E
- Country: Iran
- Province: Semnan
- County: Shahrud
- District: Central
- Rural District: Howmeh

Population (2016)
  - Total: 405
- Time zone: UTC+3:30 (IRST)

Ardian (Persian: ارديان) (Note: Also romanized as Ardīān) is a village in Howmeh Rural District of the Central District in Shahrud County, Semnan province, Iran.

== Demographics ==
=== Population ===
At the time of the 2006 National Census, the village's population was 329 in 94 households. The following census in 2011 counted 461 people in 129 households. The 2016 census measured the population of the village as 405 people in 136 households.
