= Qaleh-ye Showkat =

Village in Semnan province, Iran

Qaleh-ye Showkat Persian: قلعه شوكت
- Village
- Location within Iran
- Coordinates: 36°20′47″N 54°54′48″E
- Country: Iran
- Province: Semnan
- County: Shahrud
- District: Central
- Rural District: Howmeh

Population (2016)
  - Total: 235
- Time zone: UTC+3:30 (IRST)

Qaleh-ye Showkat (Persian: قلعه شوكت) (Note: Also romanized as Qal‘eh-ye Showkat; also known as Qal‘eh-ye Showkat Nez̧ām) is a village in Howmeh Rural District of the Central District in Shahrud County, Semnan province, Iran.

== Demographics ==
=== Population ===
At the time of the 2006 National Census, the village's population was 332 in 91 households. The following census in 2011 counted 342 people in 108 households. The 2016 census measured the population of the village as 235 people in 82 households.
