= Kharian, Iran =

Kharian (Persian: خريان) may refer to:

- Kharian, Markazi
- Kharian, Semnan
