= Zarki =

Village in Semnan province, Iran

Zarki Persian: زركي
- Village
- Location within Iran
- Coordinates: 35°24′58″N 54°41′24″E
- Country: Iran
- Province: Semnan
- County: Shahrud
- District: Central
- Rural District: Torud

Population (2016)
  - Total: 0
- Time zone: UTC+3:30 (IRST)

Zarki (Persian: زركي) (Note: Also romanized as Zarkī) is a village in Torud Rural District of the Central District in Shahrud County, Semnan province, Iran.

== Demographics ==
=== Population ===
At the time of the 2006 National Census, the village's population was 13 in four households. The village did not appear in the following census of 2011. The 2016 census measured the population of the village as zero.
