= Qaleh-ye Seddiq =

Village in Semnan province, Iran

Qaleh-ye Seddiq Persian: قلعه صديق
- Village
- Location within Iran
- Coordinates: 36°22′15″N 54°58′18″E
- Country: Iran
- Province: Semnan
- County: Shahrud
- District: Central
- Rural District: Howmeh

Population (2016)
  - Total: 187
- Time zone: UTC+3:30 (IRST)

Qaleh-ye Seddiq (Persian: قلعه صديق) (Note: Also romanized as Qal‘eh-ye Şeddīq; also known as Shahrak-e Novīn (شهرك نوين)) is a village in Howmeh Rural District of the Central District in Shahrud County, Semnan province, Iran.

== Demographics ==
=== Population ===
At the time of the 2006 National Census, the village's population was 293 in 74 households. The following census in 2011 counted 359 people in 100 households. The 2016 census measured the population of the village as 187 people in 57 households.
