= Sadabad, Shahrud =

Village in Semnan province, Iran

Sadabad Persian: سعد آباد
- Village
- Location within Iran
- Coordinates: 36°24′12″N 55°02′54″E
- Country: Iran
- Province: Semnan
- County: Shahrud
- District: Central
- Rural District: Howmeh

Population (2016)
  - Total: 280
- Time zone: UTC+3:30 (IRST)

Sadabad (Persian: سعد آباد) (Note: Also romanized as Sa‘adābād and Sa‘dābād; also known as Sa‘dābād Maḩalleh and Sa‘īdābād) is a village in Howmeh Rural District of the Central District in Shahrud County, Semnan province, Iran.

== Demographics ==
=== Population ===
At the time of the 2006 National Census, the village's population was 307 in 96 households. The following census in 2011 counted 184 people in 62 households. The 2016 census measured the population of the village as 280 people in 99 households.
