= Cheshmeh Sefid, Shahrud =

Village in Semnan province, Iran

Cheshmeh Sefid Persian: چشمه سفيد
- Village
- Location within Iran
- Country: Iran
- Province: Semnan
- County: Shahrud
- District: Central
- Rural District: Torud

Population (2016)
  - Total: 13
- Time zone: UTC+3:30 (IRST)

Cheshmeh Sefid (Persian: چشمه سفيد) (Note: Also romanized as Cheshmeh Sefīd) is a village in Torud Rural District of the Central District in Shahrud County, Semnan province, Iran.

== Demographics ==
=== Population ===
At the time of the 2006 National Census, the village's population was 21 in six households. The village did not appear in the following census of 2011. The 2016 census measured the population of the village as 13 people in four households.
