= Salehabad, Shahrud =

Village in Semnan province, Iran

Salehabad Persian: صالح آباد
- Village
- Location within Iran
- Coordinates: 36°15′31″N 54°48′16″E
- Country: Iran
- Province: Semnan
- County: Shahrud
- District: Central
- Rural District: Dehmolla

Population (2016)
  - Total: 134
- Time zone: UTC+3:30 (IRST)

Salehabad (Persian: صالح آباد) (Note: Also romanized as Şāleḩābād) is a village in Dehmolla Rural District of the Central District in Shahrud County, Semnan province, Iran.

== Demographics ==
=== Population ===
At the time of the 2006 National Census, the village's population was 103 in 30 households. The following census in 2011 counted 146 people in 52 households. The 2016 census measured the population of the village as 134 people in 43 households.
