= Rahanjan =

Village in Semnan province, Iran

Rahanjan Persian: راهنجان
- Village
- Location within Iran
- Coordinates: 36°15′29″N 54°45′54″E
- Country: Iran
- Province: Semnan
- County: Shahrud
- District: Central
- Rural District: Dehmolla

Population (2016)
  - Total: 521
- Time zone: UTC+3:30 (IRST)

Rahanjan (Persian: راهنجان) (Note: Also romanized as Rāhanjān) is a village in Dehmolla Rural District of the Central District in Shahrud County, Semnan province, Iran.

== Demographics ==
=== Population ===
At the time of the 2006 National Census, the village's population was 356 in 97 households. The following census in 2011 counted 167 people in 57 households. The 2016 census measured the population of the village as 521 people in 183 households.
