= Bidestan, Semnan =

Village in Semnan province, Iran

Bidestan Persian: بيدستان
- Village
- Location within Iran
- Coordinates: 35°16′57″N 54°43′48″E
- Country: Iran
- Province: Semnan
- County: Shahrud
- District: Central
- Rural District: Torud

Population (2016)
  - Total: 241
- Time zone: UTC+3:30 (IRST)

Bidestan (Persian: بيدستان) (Note: Also romanized as Bīdestān; also known as Pāistān) is a village in Torud Rural District of the Central District in Shahrud County, Semnan province, Iran.

== Demographics ==
=== Population ===
At the time of the 2006 National Census, the village's population was 272 in 66 households. The following census in 2011 counted 248 people in 70 households. The 2016 census measured the population of the village as 241 people in 70 households.
