= Turut =

Turut may refer to:

- İsmail Türüt (b. 1965), Turkish folk singer
- Mehmet Türüt (b. 1945), Turkish wrestler
- Turut, Iran (disambiguation)
