= Ruyan, Semnan =

City in Semnan province, Iran

Ruyan Persian: رويان
- City
- Location within Iran
- Coordinates: 36°21′03″N 55°00′10″E
- Country: Iran
- Province: Semnan
- County: Shahrud
- District: Central
- Established as a city: 2016

Population (2016)
  - Total: 4,634
- Time zone: UTC+3:30 (IRST)

Ruyan (Persian: رويان) (Note: Also romanized as Rūyān; formerly known as the city of Rudiyan (روديان) and the village of Ruyan (رويان)) is a city in the Central District of Shahrud County, Semnan province, Iran, serving as the administrative center for Howmeh Rural District.

== Demographics ==
=== Population ===
At the time of the 2006 National Census, the population was 3,295 in 871 households, when it was the village of Ruyan in Howmeh Rural District. The following census in 2011 counted 3,266 people in 1,039 households. The 2016 census measured the population as 3,770 people in 1,228 households, by which time the village had been converted to the city of Rudiyan. The city was renamed Ruyan in 2021.
