= Moghan, Semnan =

Village in Semnan province, Iran

Moghan Persian: مغان
- Village
- Location within Iran
- Coordinates: 36°22′32″N 54°57′27″E
- Country: Iran
- Province: Semnan
- County: Shahrud
- District: Central
- Rural District: Howmeh

Population (2016)
  - Total: 1,804
- Time zone: UTC+3:30 (IRST)

Moghan (Persian: مغان) (Note: Also romanized as Moghān) is a village in Howmeh Rural District of the Central District in Shahrud County, Semnan province, Iran.

== Demographics ==
=== Population ===
At the time of the 2006 National Census, the village's population was 1,631 in 453 households. The following census in 2011 counted 1,758 people in 538 households. The 2016 census measured the population of the village as 1,804 people in 580 households.
