= Dehmolla =

Village in Semnan province, Iran

Dehmolla Persian: دهملا
- Village
- Location within Iran
- Coordinates: 36°16′24″N 54°45′38″E
- Country: Iran
- Province: Semnan
- County: Shahrud
- District: Central
- Rural District: Dehmolla

Population (2016)
  - Total: 1,090
- Time zone: UTC+3:30 (IRST)

Dehmolla (Persian: دهملا) (Note: Also romanized as Deh-e Mollā and Dehmollā; also known as Deh-i-Mulla and Kalāteh-ye Mollā) is a village in, and the capital of, Dehmolla Rural District in the Central District of Shahrud County, Semnan province, Iran.

== Demographics ==
=== Population ===
At the time of the 2006 National Census, the village's population was 1,138 in 356 households. The following census in 2011 counted 1,051 people in 348 households. The 2016 census measured the population of the village as 1,090 people in 395 households, the most populous in its rural district.
