= Howmeh Rural District (Shahrud County) =

Rural district in Semnan province, Iran

Howmeh Rural District Persian: دهستان حومه
- Rural District
- Location within Iran
- Coordinates: 36°19′N 55°06′E
- Country: Iran
- Province: Semnan
- County: Shahrud
- District: Central
- Established: 1987
- Capital: Ruyan

Population (2016)
  - Total: 7,366
- Time zone: UTC+3:30 (IRST)

Howmeh Rural District (Persian: دهستان حومه) is in the Central District of Shahrud County, Semnan province, Iran. It is administered from the city of Ruyan.

== Demographics ==
=== Population ===
At the time of the 2006 National Census, the rural district's population was 10,008 in 2,806 households. There were 9,555 inhabitants in 3,010 households at the following census of 2011. The 2016 census measured the population of the rural district as 7,366 in 2,073 households. The most populous of its 68 villages was Dizaj, with 1,838 people.

=== Other villages in the rural district ===
- Ardian
- Bedasht
- Farahabad
- Hoseynabad-e Saghar
- Jafarabad
- Moghan
- Qaleh Now-e Khaleseh
- Qaleh-ye Azodi
- Qaleh-ye Seddiq
- Qaleh-ye Showkat
- Sadabad
- Tall
- Yunesabad
