= Yunesabad, Semnan =

Village in Semnan province, Iran

Yunesabad Persian: يونس آباد
- Village
- Location within Iran
- Coordinates: 36°21′03″N 54°58′36″E
- Country: Iran
- Province: Semnan
- County: Shahrud
- District: Central
- Rural District: Howmeh

Population (2016)
  - Total: 519
- Time zone: UTC+3:30 (IRST)

Yunesabad (Persian: يونس آباد) (Note: Also romanized as Yūnesābād) is a village in Howmeh Rural District of the Central District in Shahrud County, Semnan province, Iran.

== Demographics ==
=== Population ===
At the time of the 2006 National Census, the village's population was 550 in 144 households. The following census in 2011 counted 499 people in 158 households. The 2016 census measured the population of the village as 519 people in 169 households.
