= Khurian, Shahrud =

Village in Semnan province, Iran

Khurian Persian: خوريان
- Village
- Location within Iran
- Coordinates: 36°19′30″N 54°53′25″E
- Country: Iran
- Province: Semnan
- County: Shahrud
- District: Central
- Rural District: Dehmolla

Population (2016)
  - Total: 74
- Time zone: UTC+3:30 (IRST)

Khurian (Persian: خوريان) (Note: Also romanized as Khowryān and Khūrīān; also known as Kharīān) is a village in Dehmolla Rural District of the Central District in Shahrud County, Semnan province, Iran.

== Demographics ==
=== Population ===
At the time of the 2006 National Census, the village's population was 93 in 37 households. The following census in 2011 counted 46 people in 21 households. The 2016 census measured the population of the village as 74 people in 29 households.
