= Dehmolla Rural District =

Rural district in Semnan province, Iran

Dehmolla Rural District Persian: دهستان دهملا
- Rural District
- Location within Iran
- Coordinates: 36°15′N 54°46′E
- Country: Iran
- Province: Semnan
- County: Shahrud
- District: Central
- Established: 1987
- Capital: Dehmolla

Population (2016)
  - Total: 2,317
- Time zone: UTC+3:30 (IRST)

Dehmolla Rural District (Persian: دهستان دهملا) is in the Central District of Shahrud County, Semnan province, Iran. Its capital is the village of Dehmolla.

== Demographics ==
=== Population ===
At the time of the 2006 National Census, the rural district's population was 2,197 in 669 households. There were 1,797 inhabitants in 634 households at the following census of 2011. The 2016 census measured the population of the rural district as 2,317 in 846 households. The most populous of its 24 villages was Dehmolla, with 1,090 people.

=== Other villages in the rural district ===
- Aliabad
- Kalateh-ye Khan
- Khurian
- Qaleh Hajji
- Rahanjan
- Salehabad
