= Mehdiabad, Shahrud =

Village in Semnan province, Iran

Mehdiabad Persian: مهدي آباد
- Village
- Location within Iran
- Coordinates: 35°16′20″N 54°41′58″E
- Country: Iran
- Province: Semnan
- County: Shahrud
- District: Central
- Rural District: Torud

Population (2016)
  - Total: 179
- Time zone: UTC+3:30 (IRST)

Mehdiabad (Persian: مهدي آباد) (Note: Also romanized as Mehdīābād) is a village in Torud Rural District of the Central District in Shahrud County, Semnan province, Iran.

== Demographics ==
=== Population ===
At the time of the 2006 National Census, the village's population was 142 in 34 households. The following census in 2011 counted 169 people in 44 households. The 2016 census measured the population of the village as 179 people in 61 households.
