= Dar Sufeh =

Dar Sufeh درصوفه
- Village
- Location within Iran
- Coordinates: 34°15′47″N 58°27′56″E
- Country: Iran
- Province: Razavi Khorasan
- County: Gonabad
- Bakhsh: Kakhk
- Rural District: Zibad

Population (2006)
  - Total: 16
- Time zone: UTC+3:30 (IRST)
  - Summer (DST): UTC+4:30 (IRDT)

Dar Sufeh (Persian: درصوفه, also Romanized as Dar Şūfeh and Darsūfeh; also known as Darb Sūfeh and Kalāteh-ye Mollā) is a village in Zibad Rural District, Kakhk District, Gonabad County, Razavi Khorasan Province, Iran. At the 2006 census, its population was 16, in 6 families.

== Gallery ==
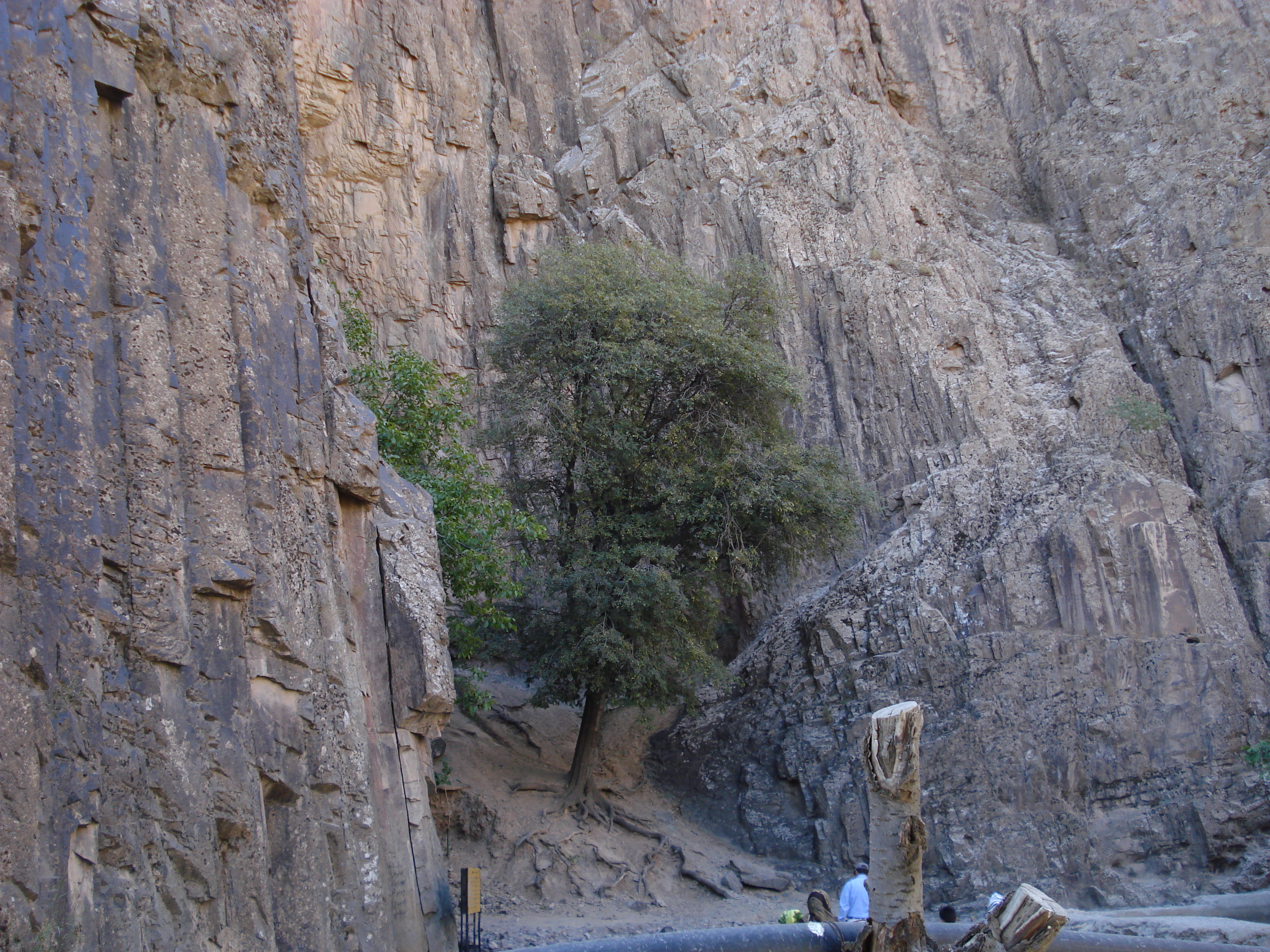
holy tree

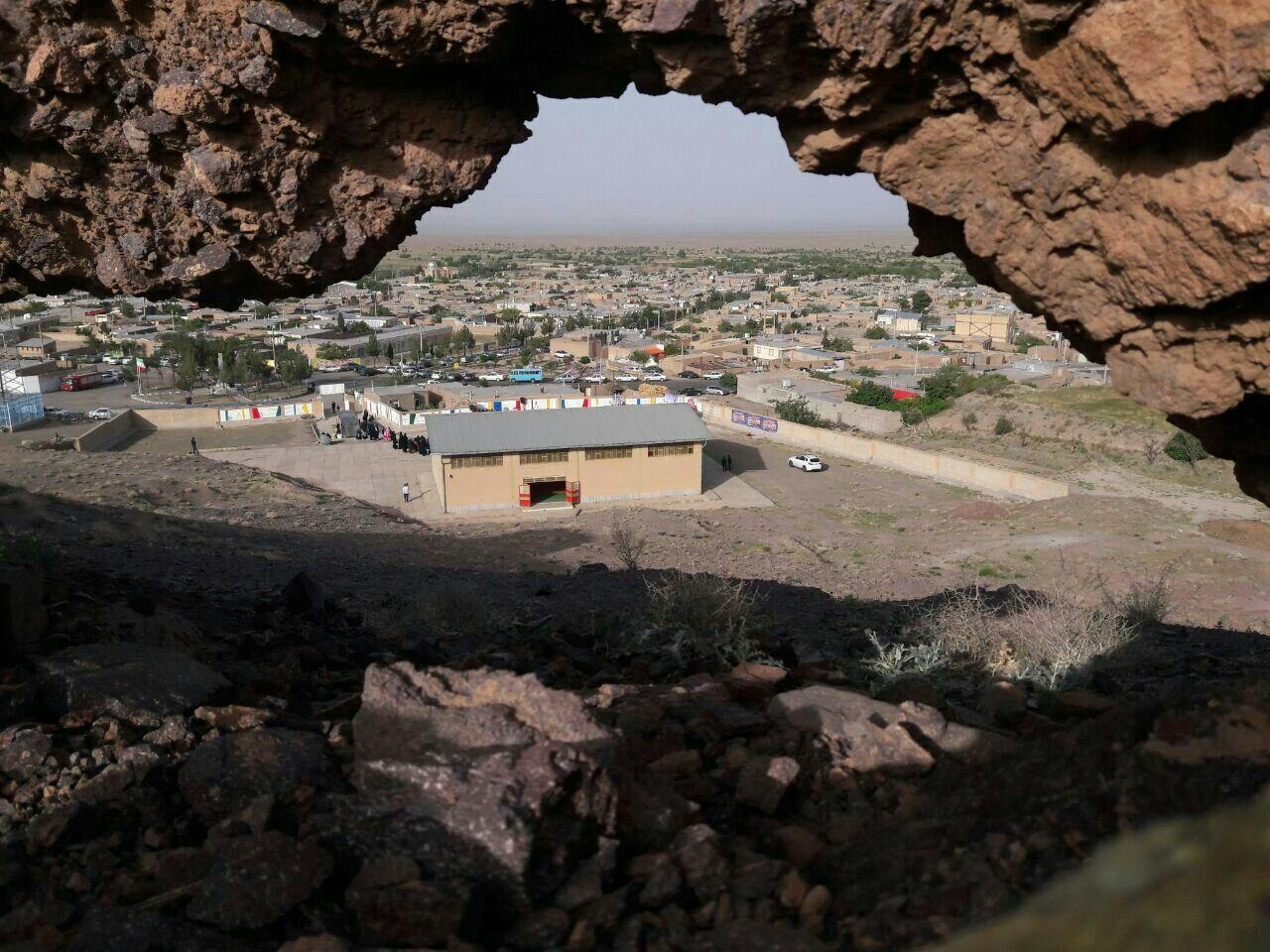
Zibad Castle

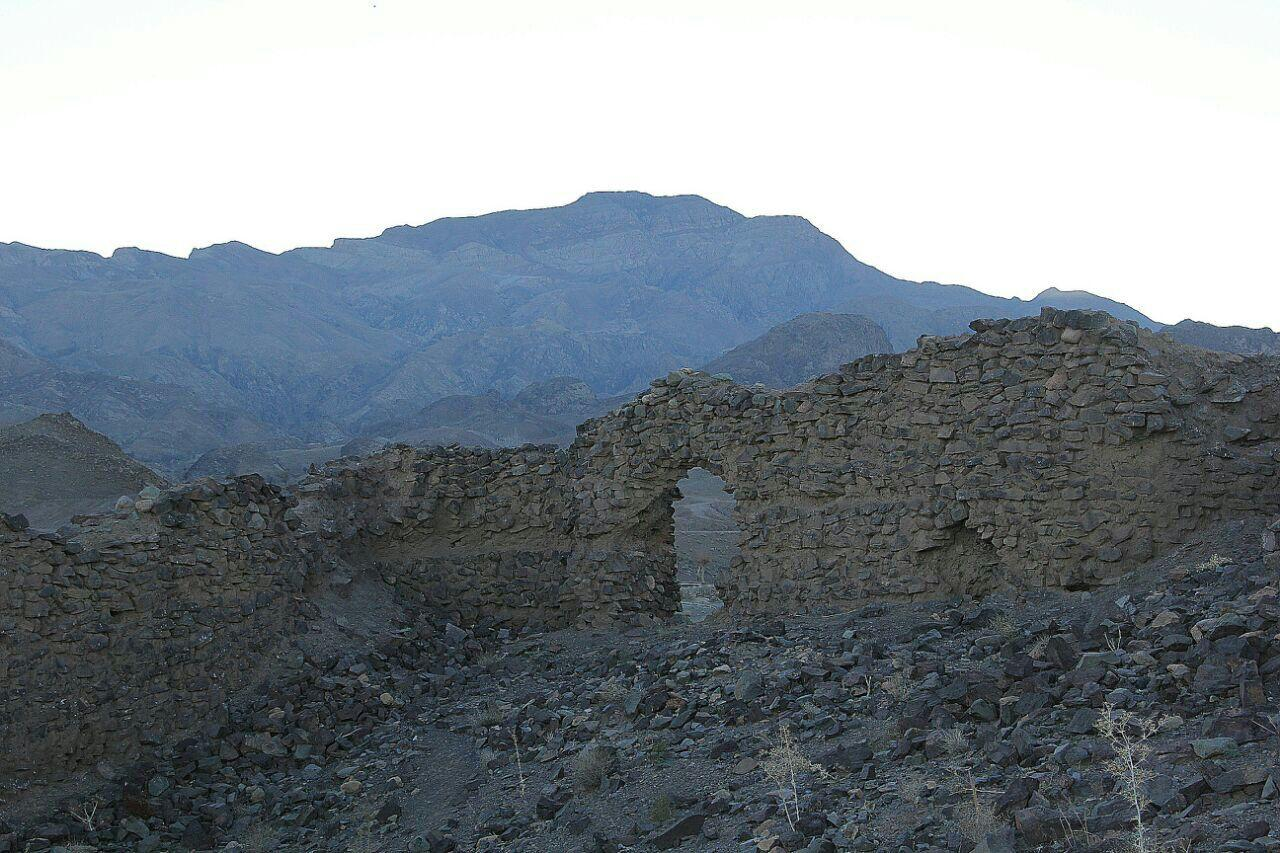
Zibad Castle

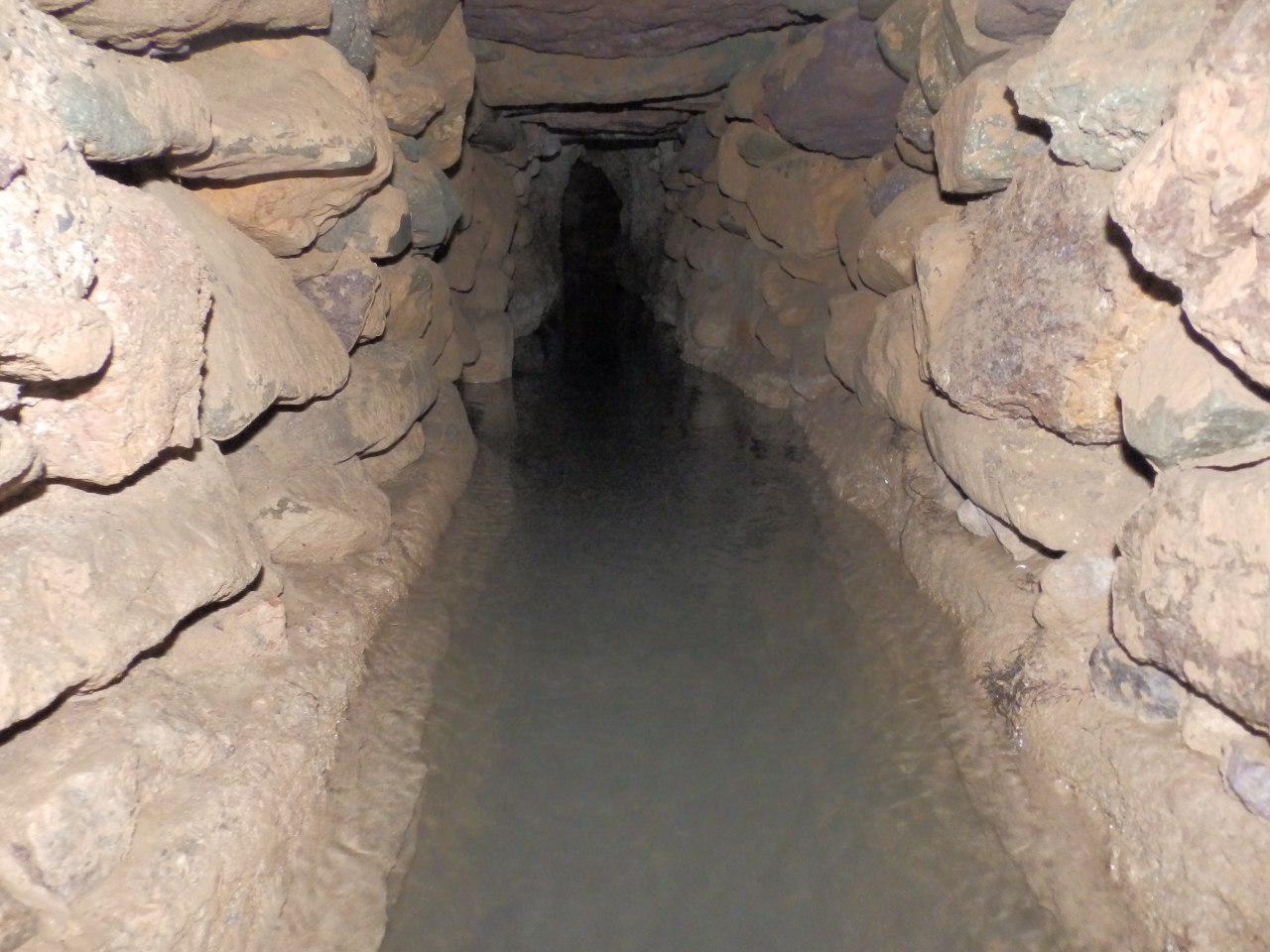
Kariz Zebad

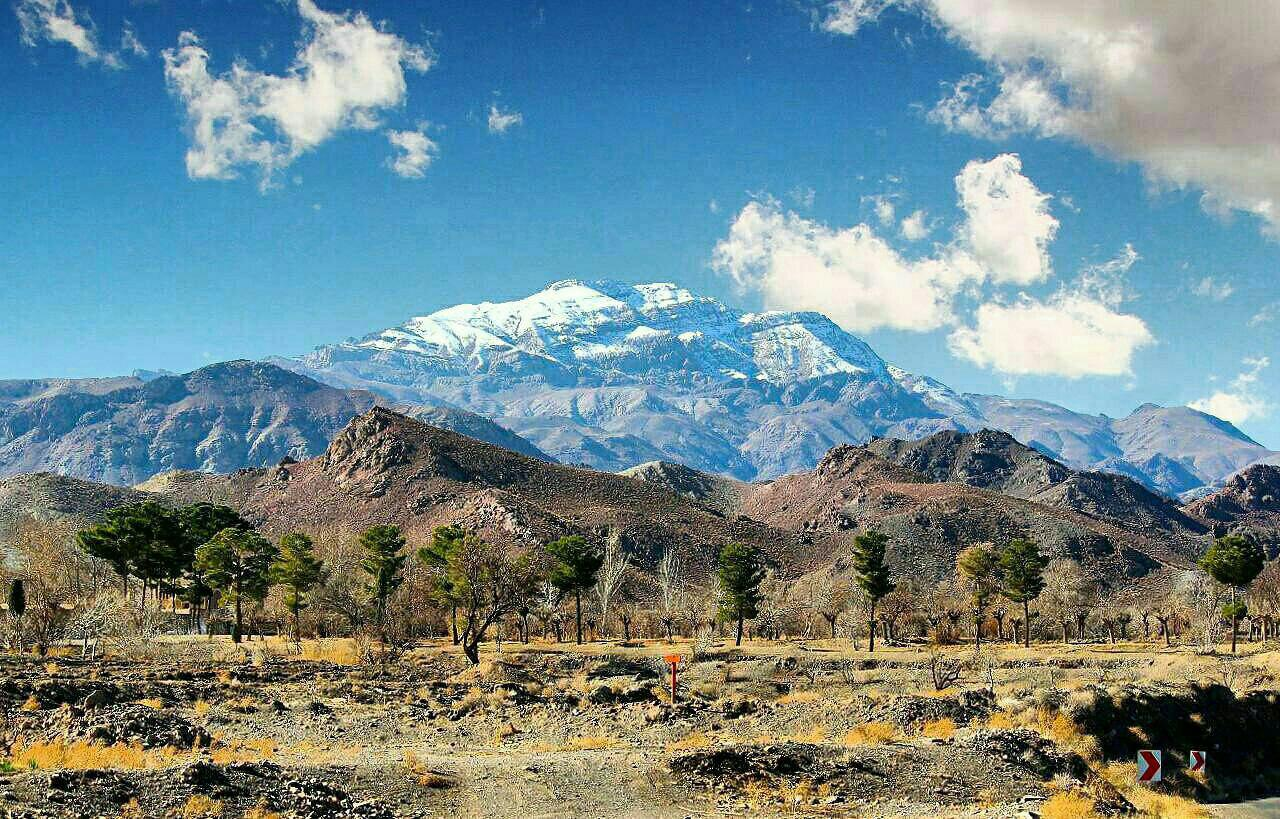
zibad Mountain

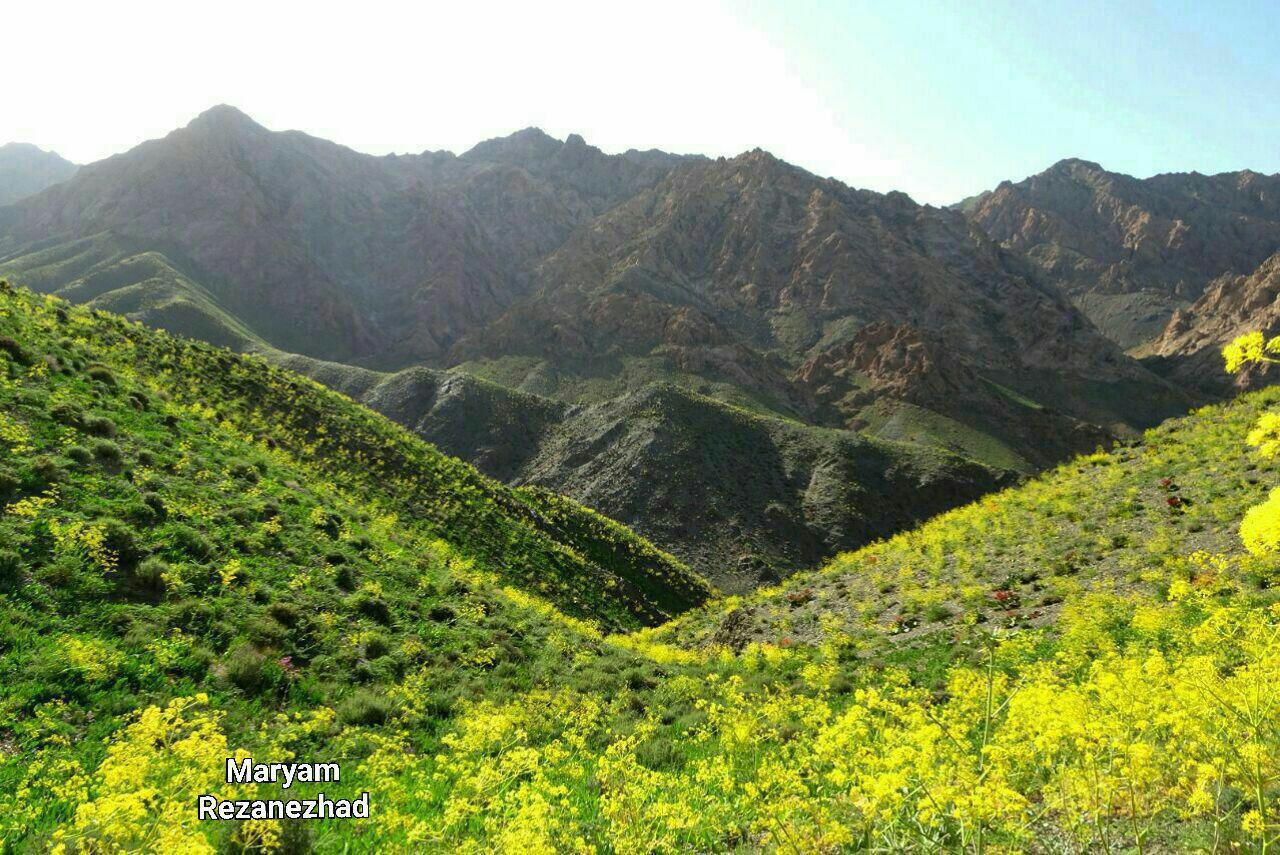
Ferula Zibad

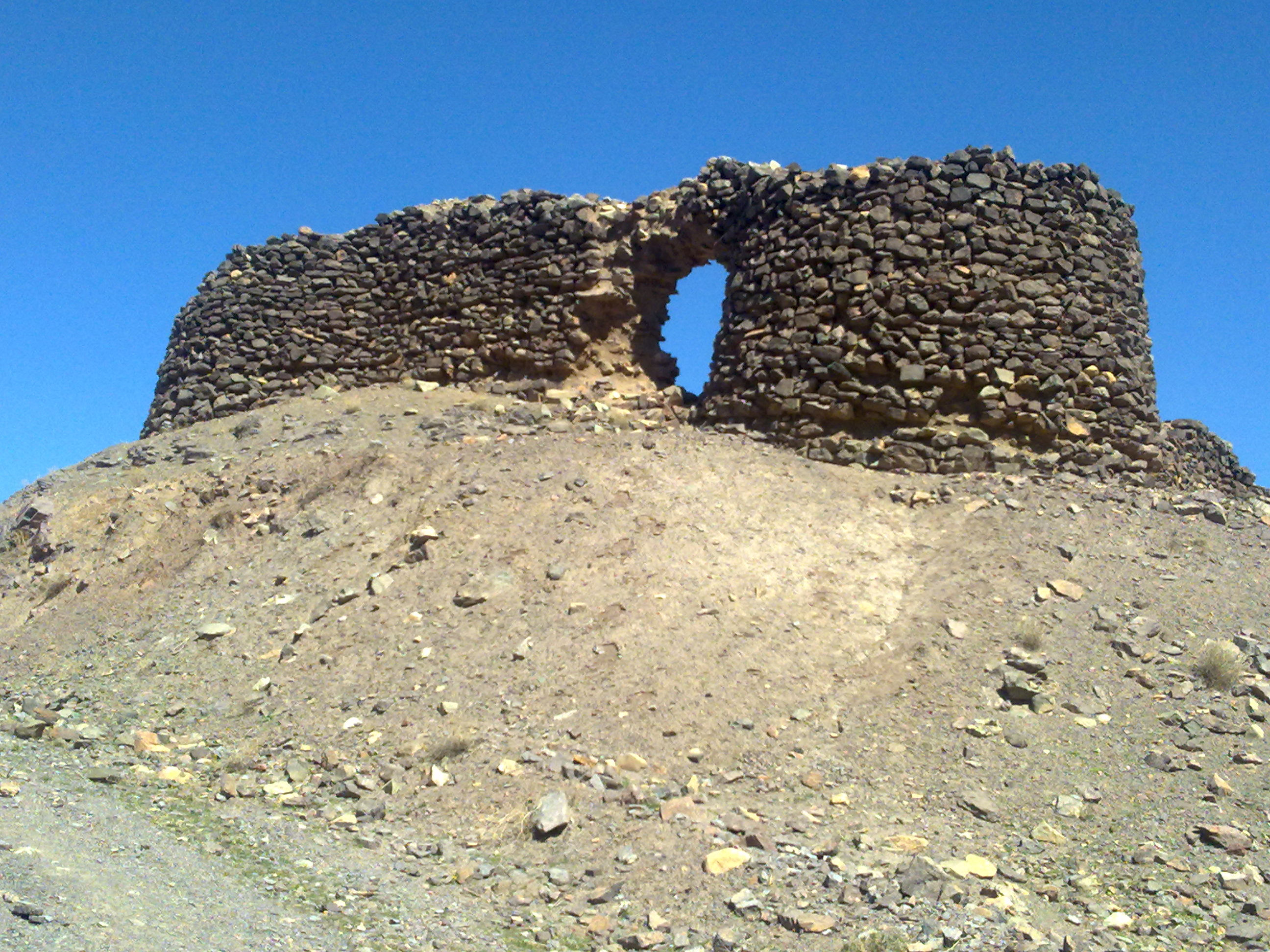
Sassanian Castel

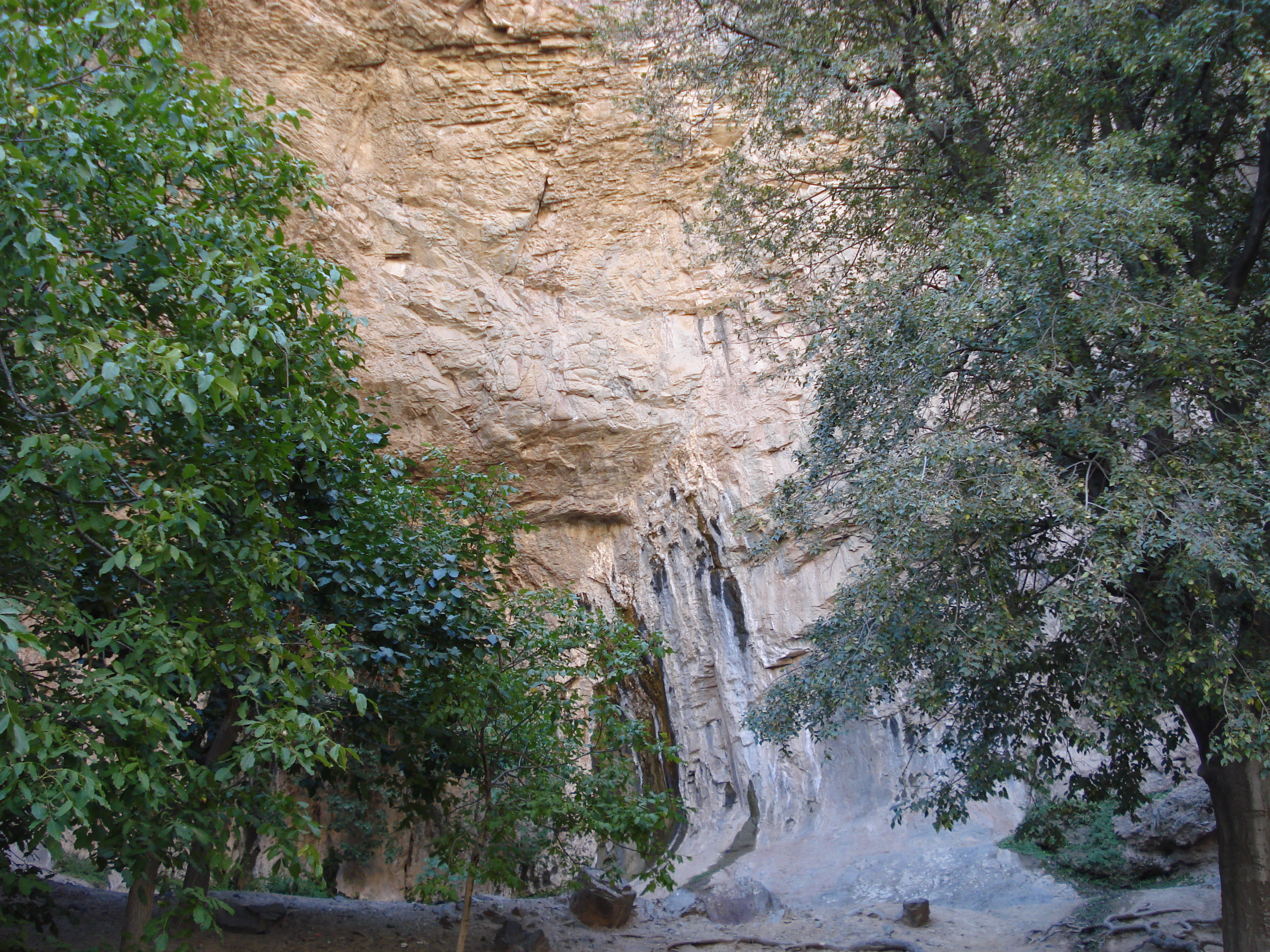
Soufe Zibad

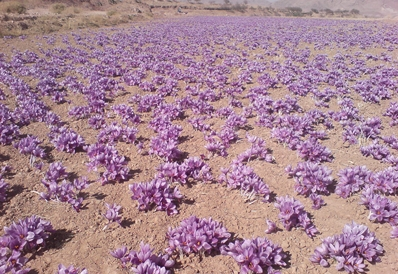

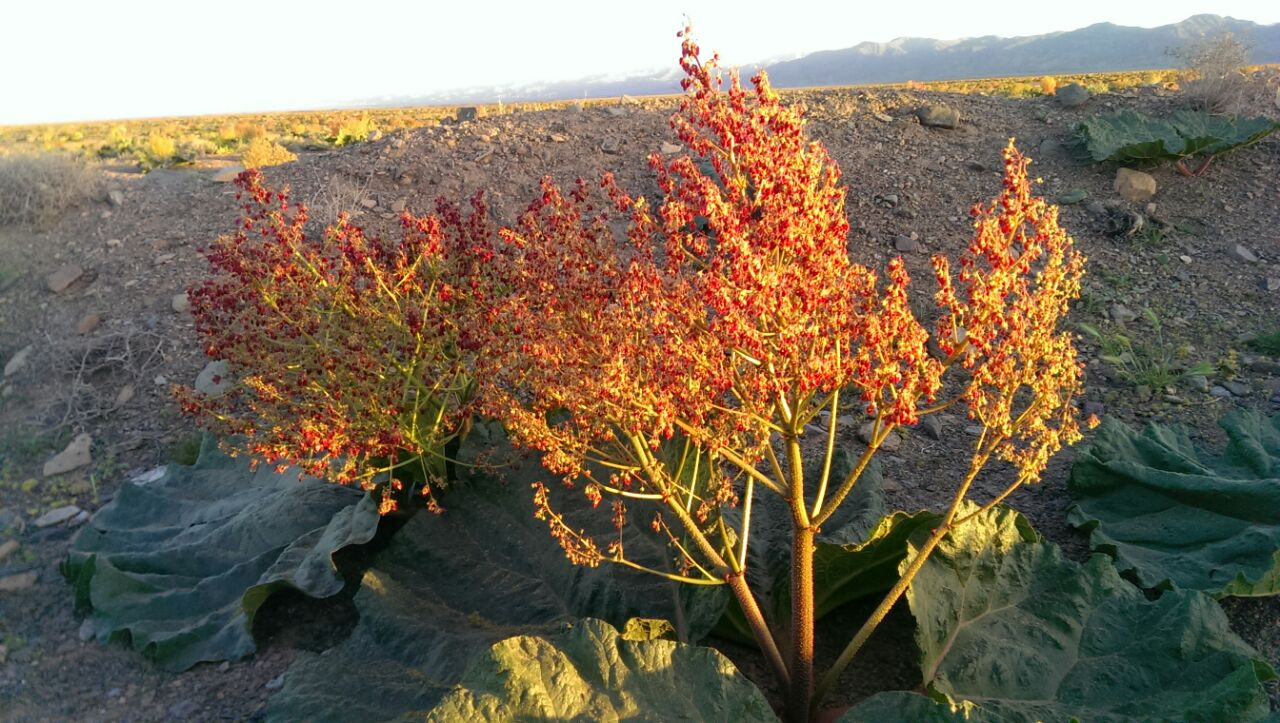
Rivas zibad

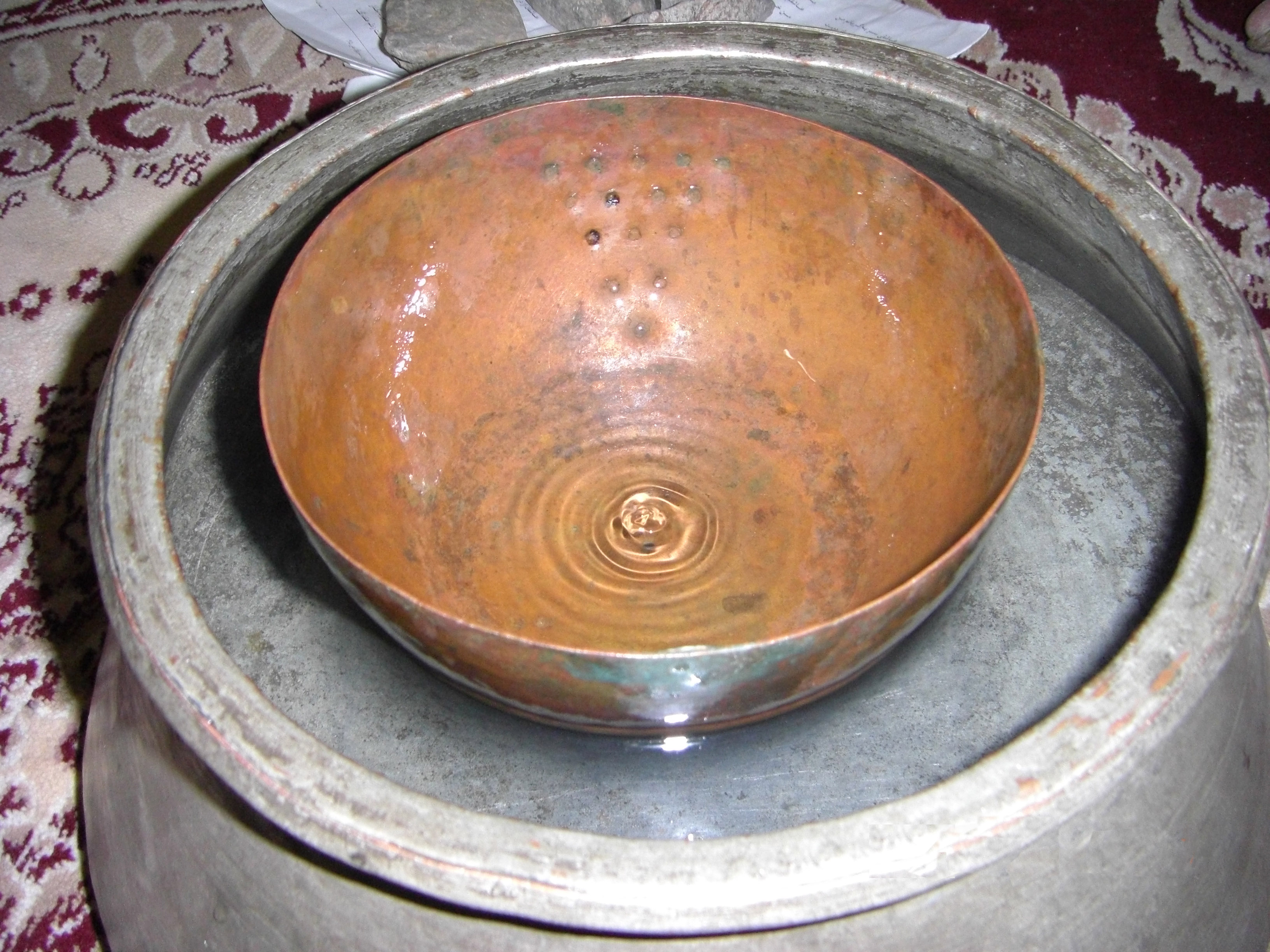
Ancient water clock used in qanat of gonabad 2500 years ago

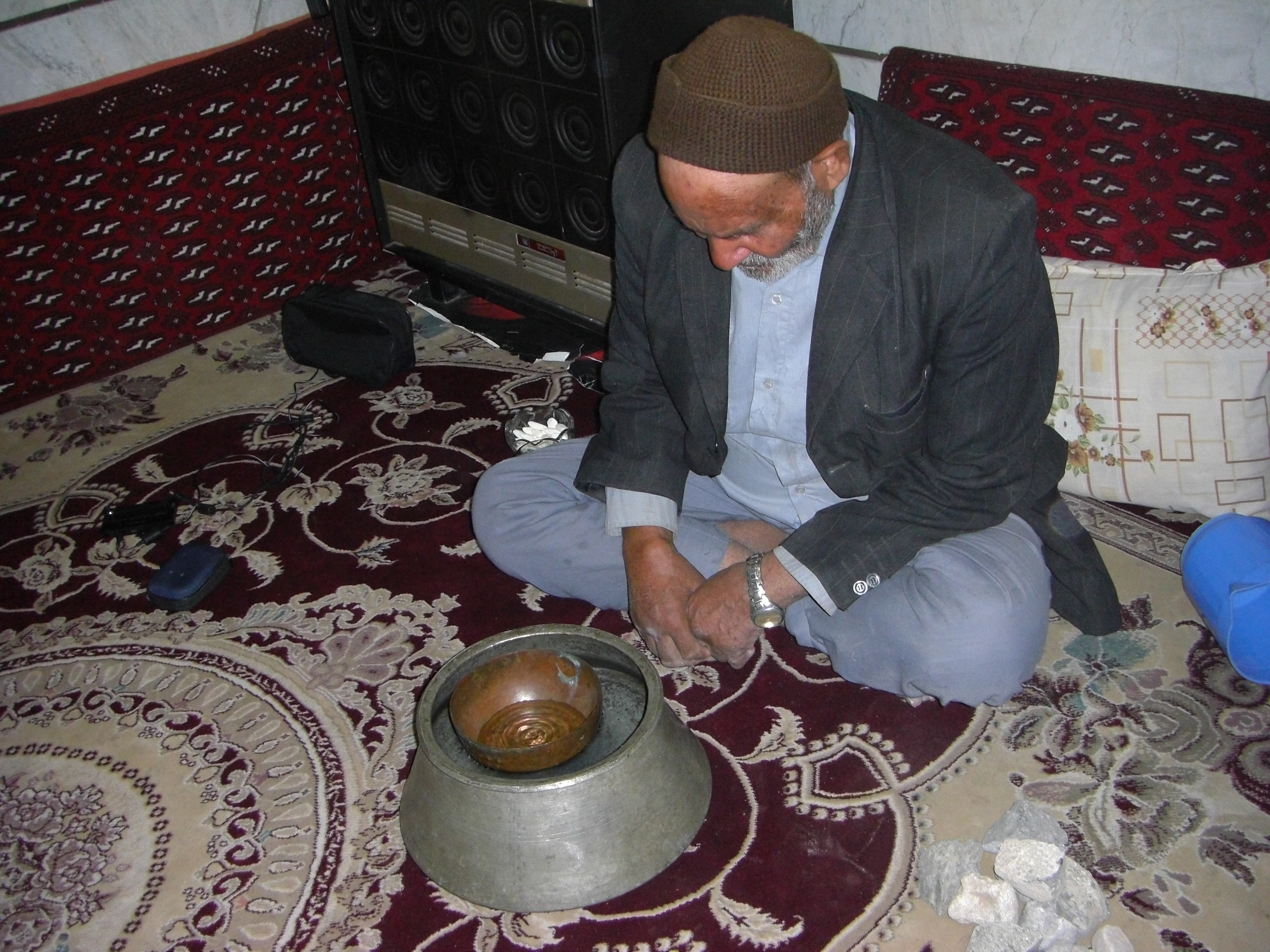
Reconstruction of the scene with a real manager of the water clock, Iran

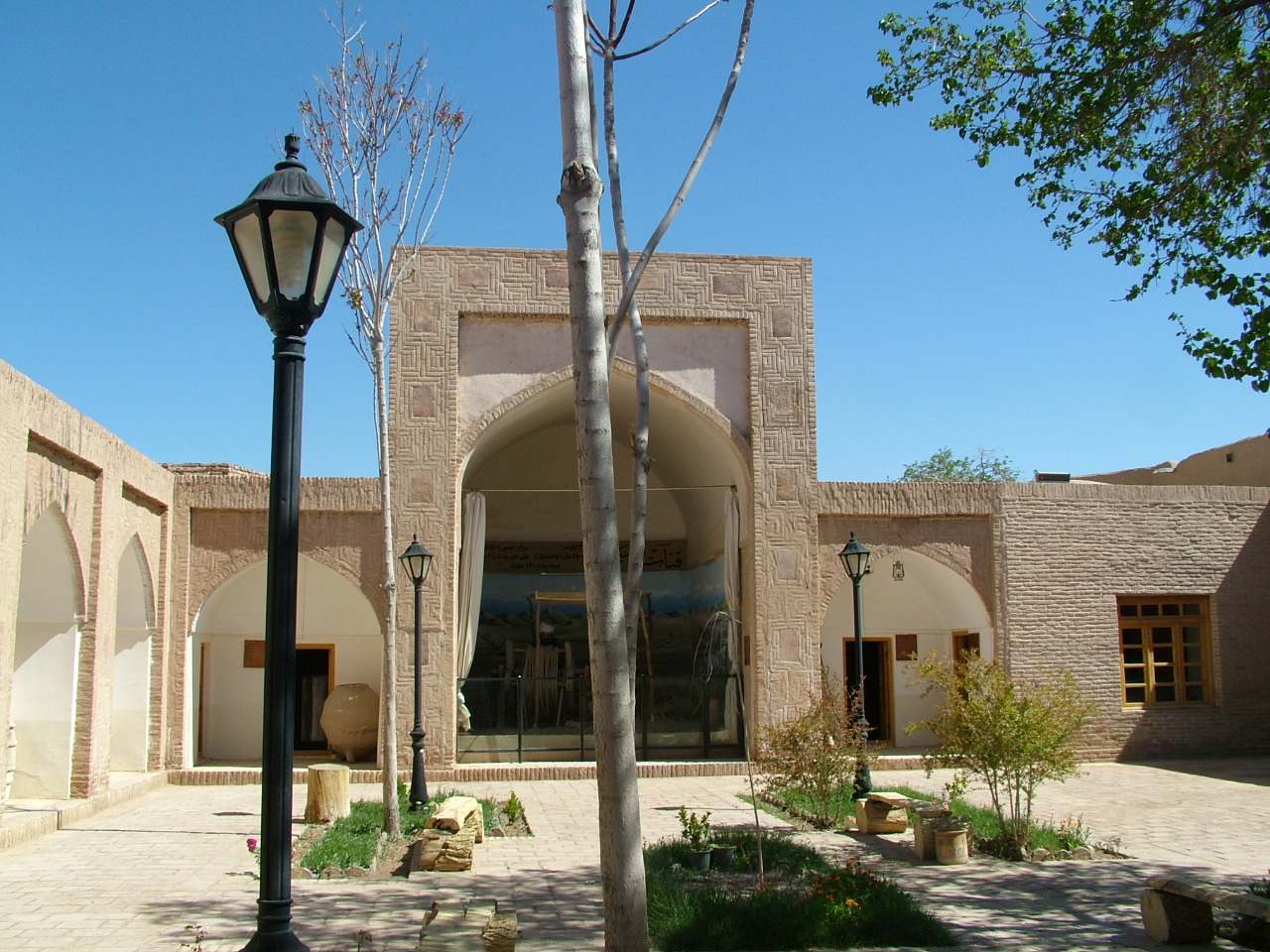

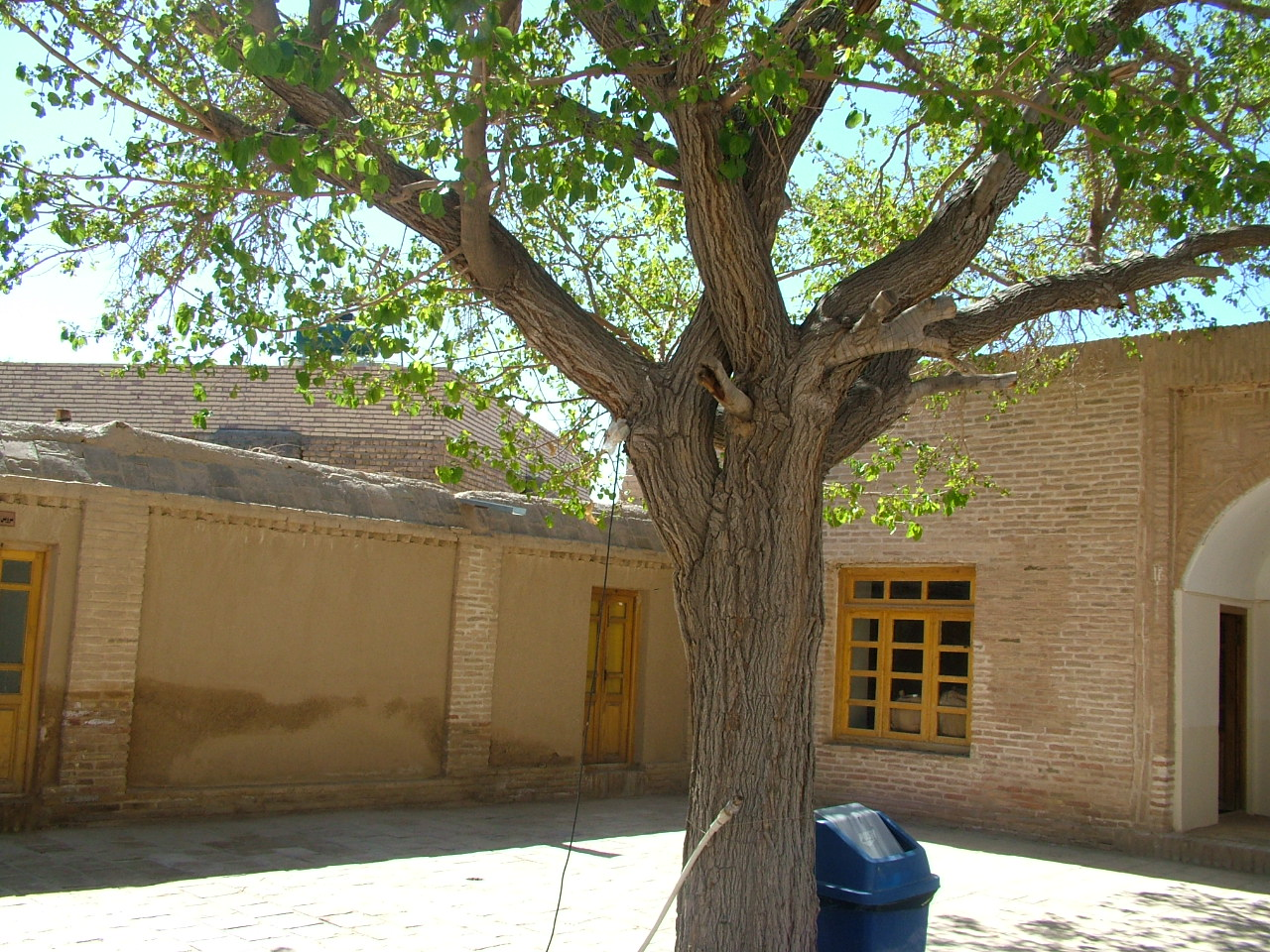

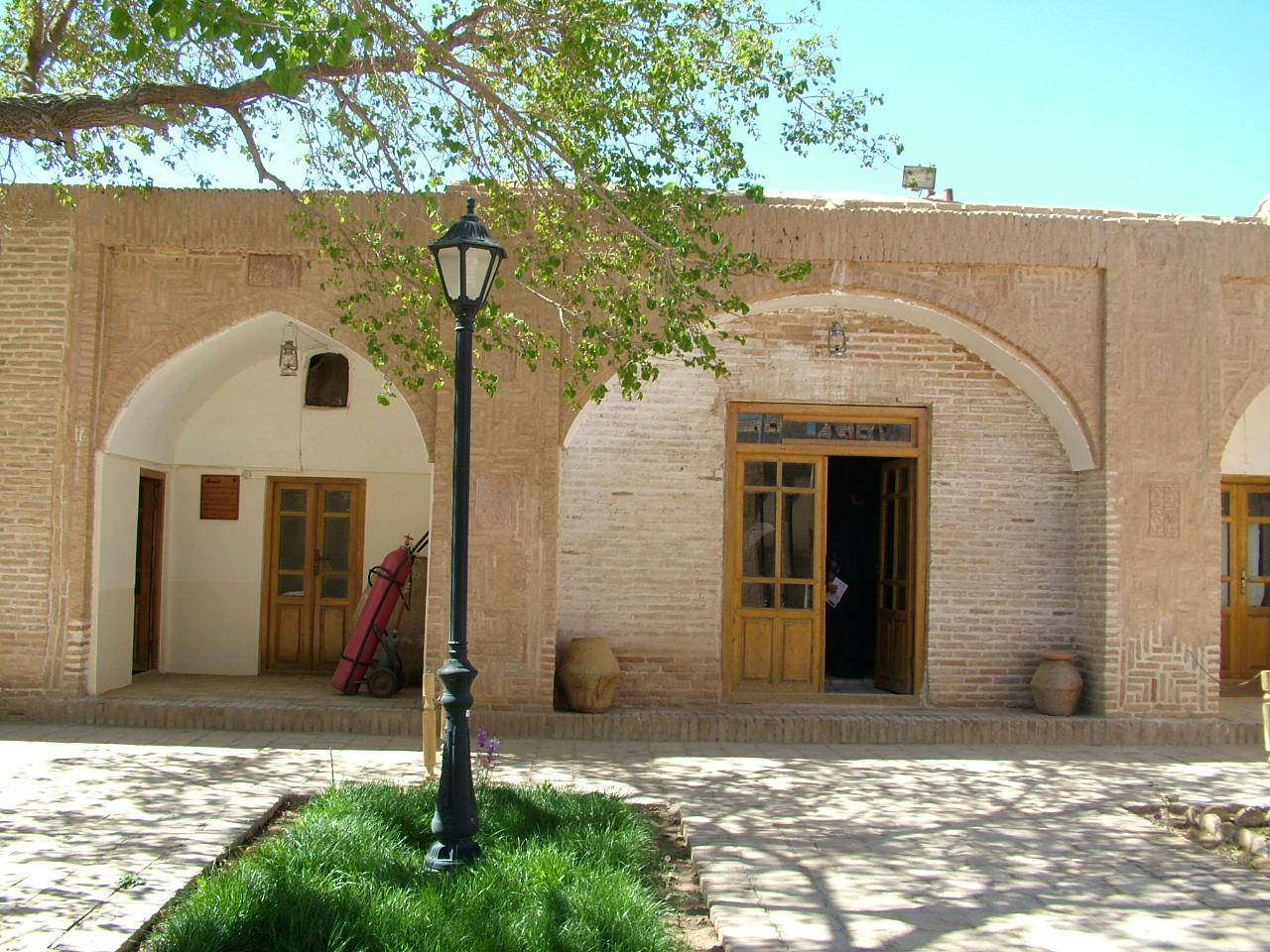

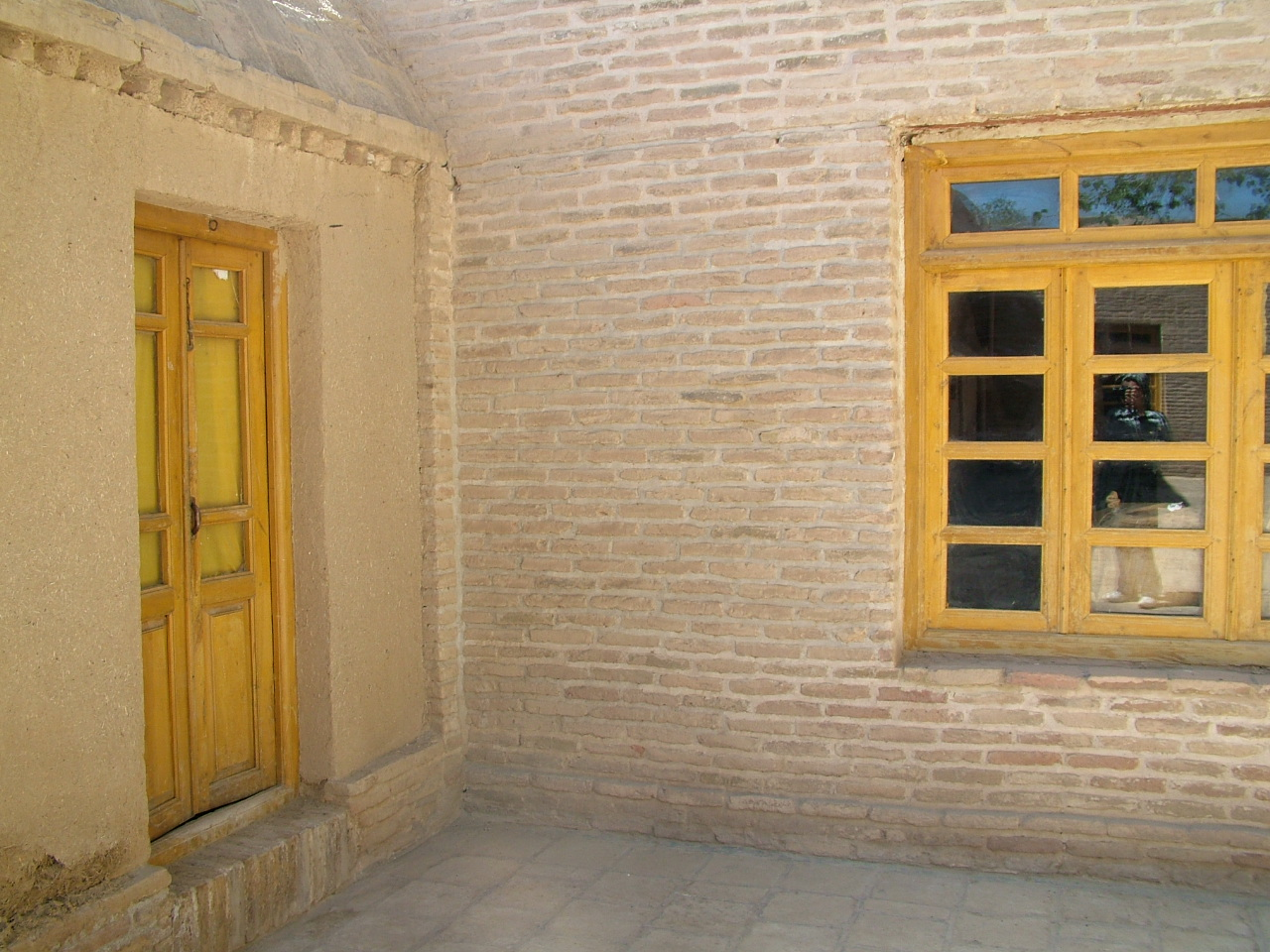

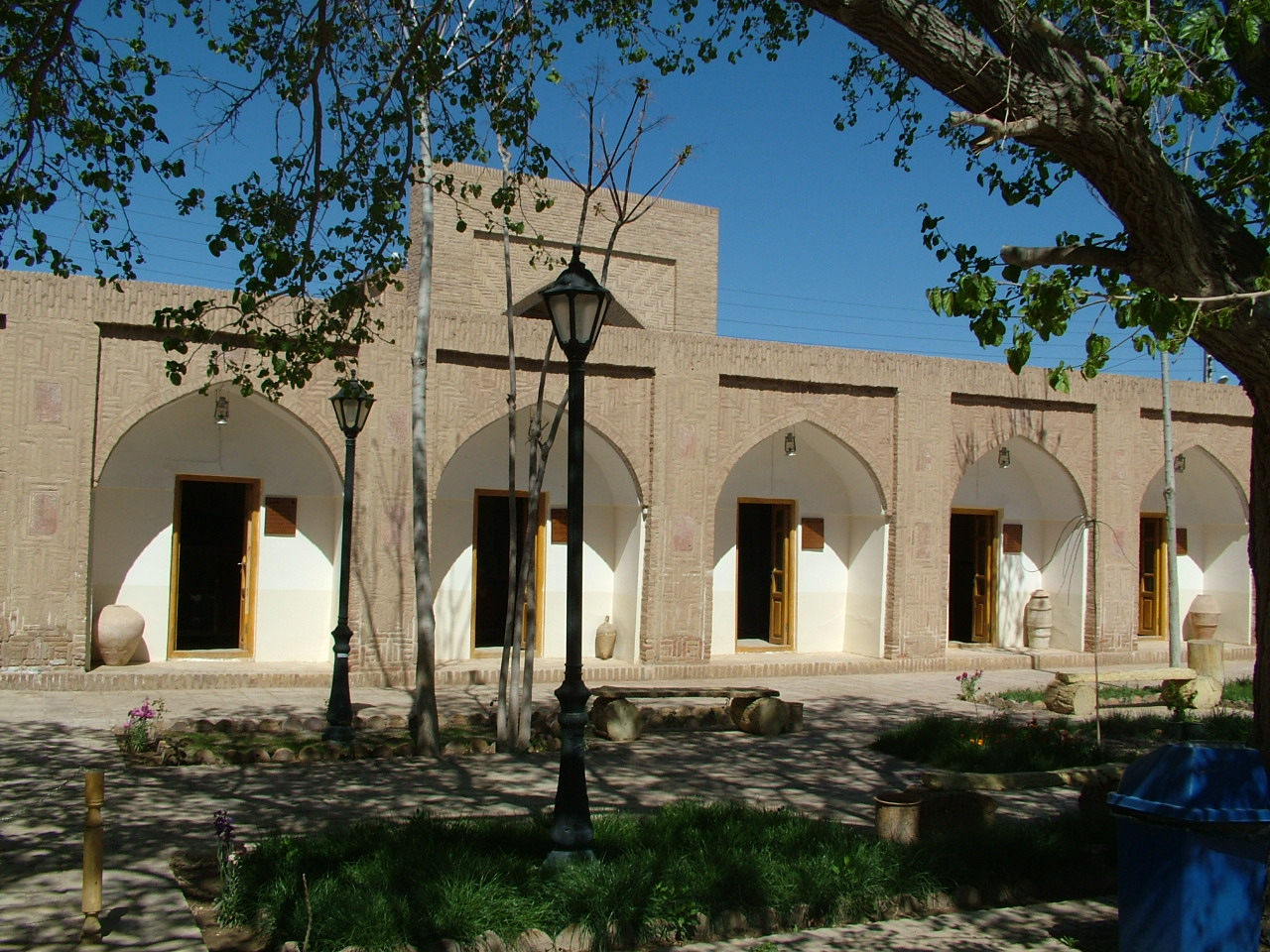

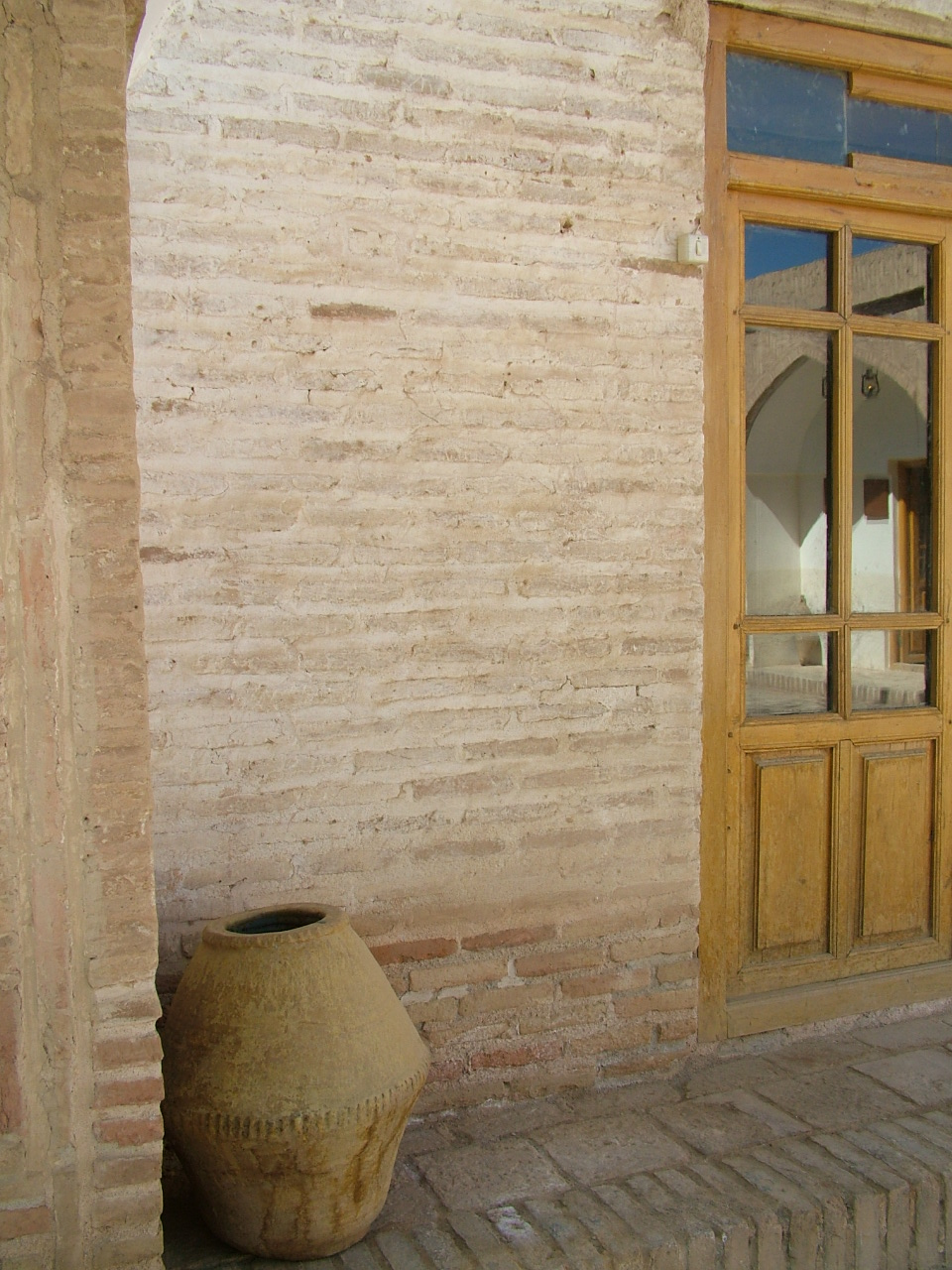

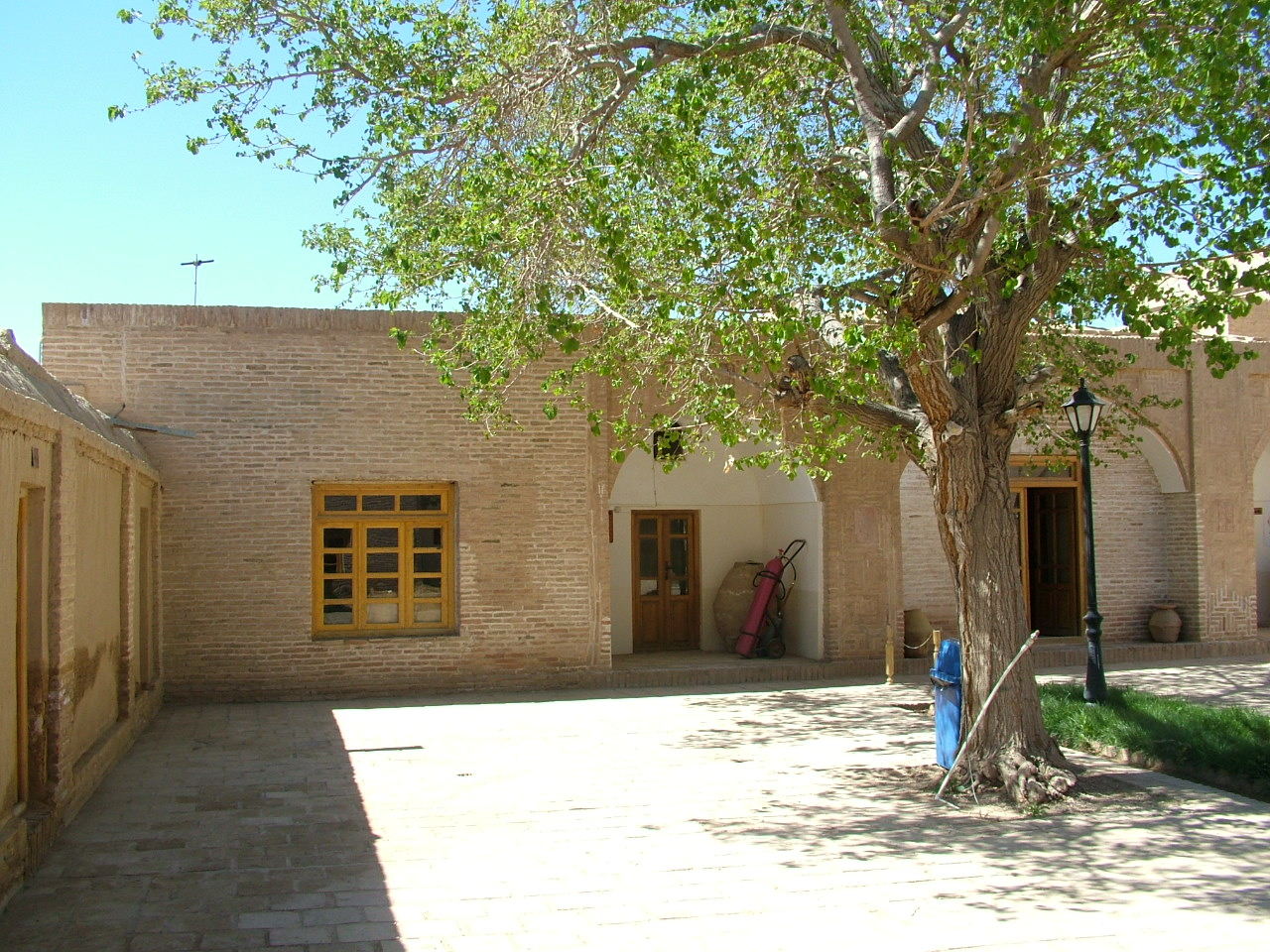

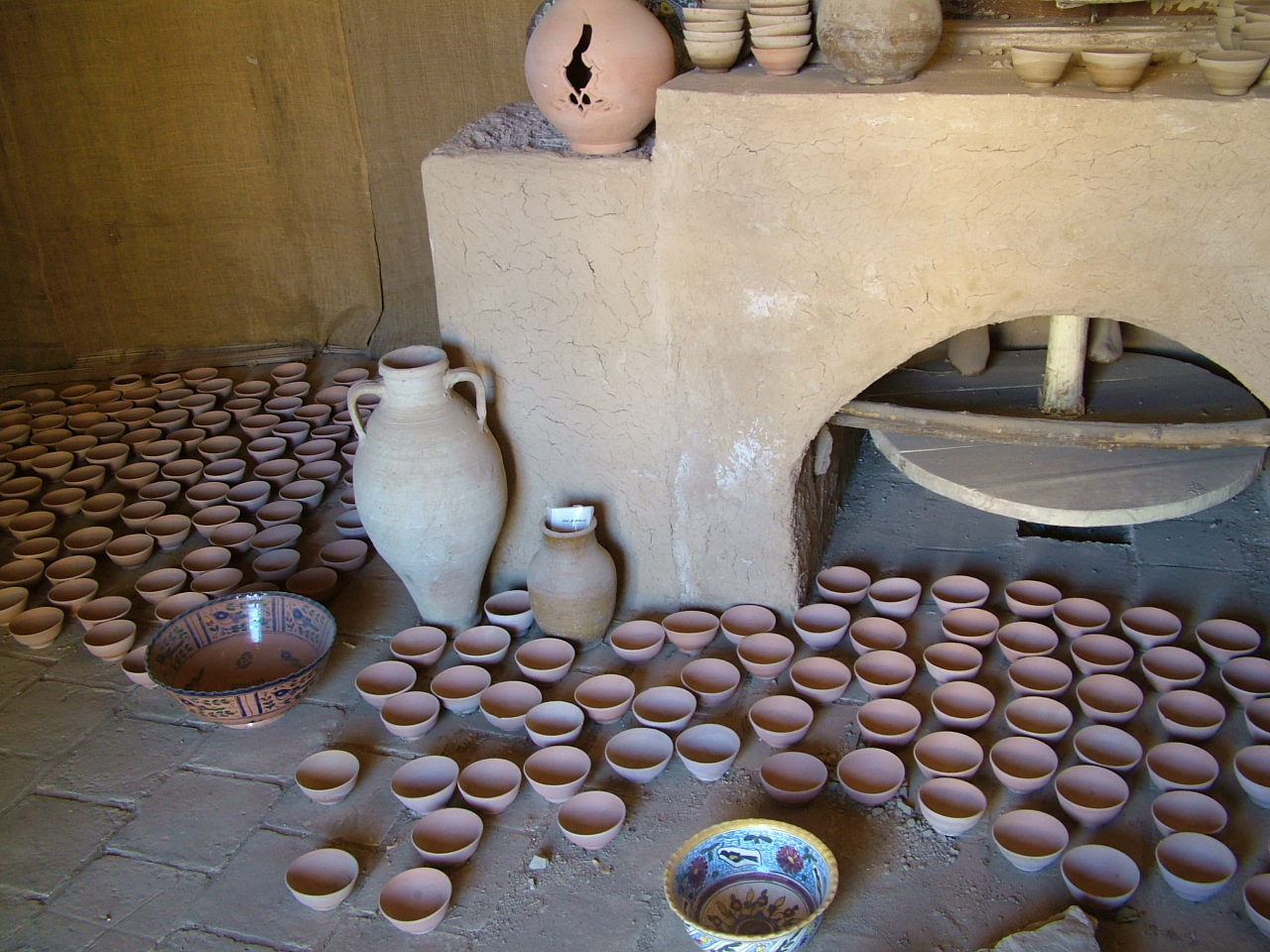

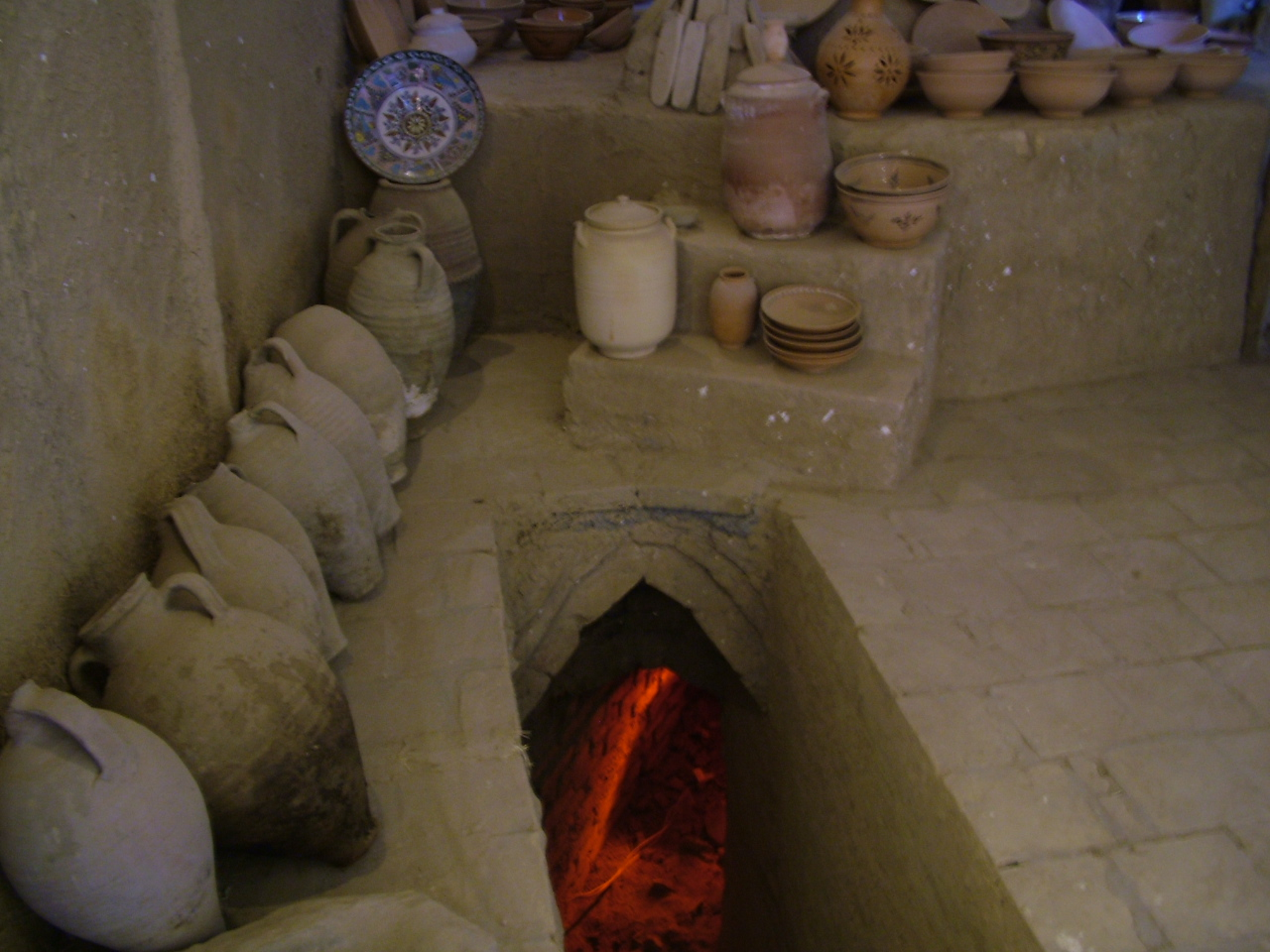

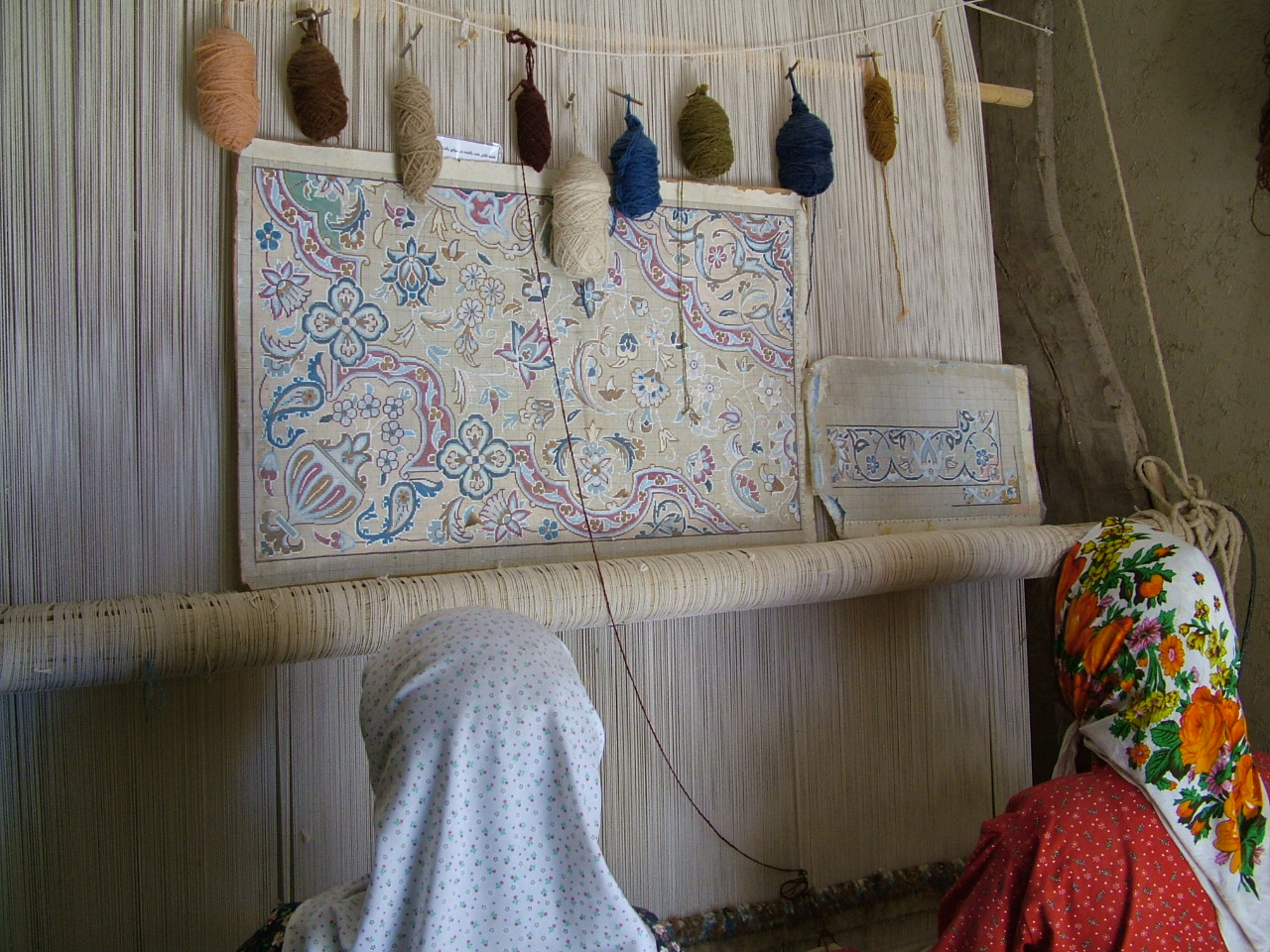

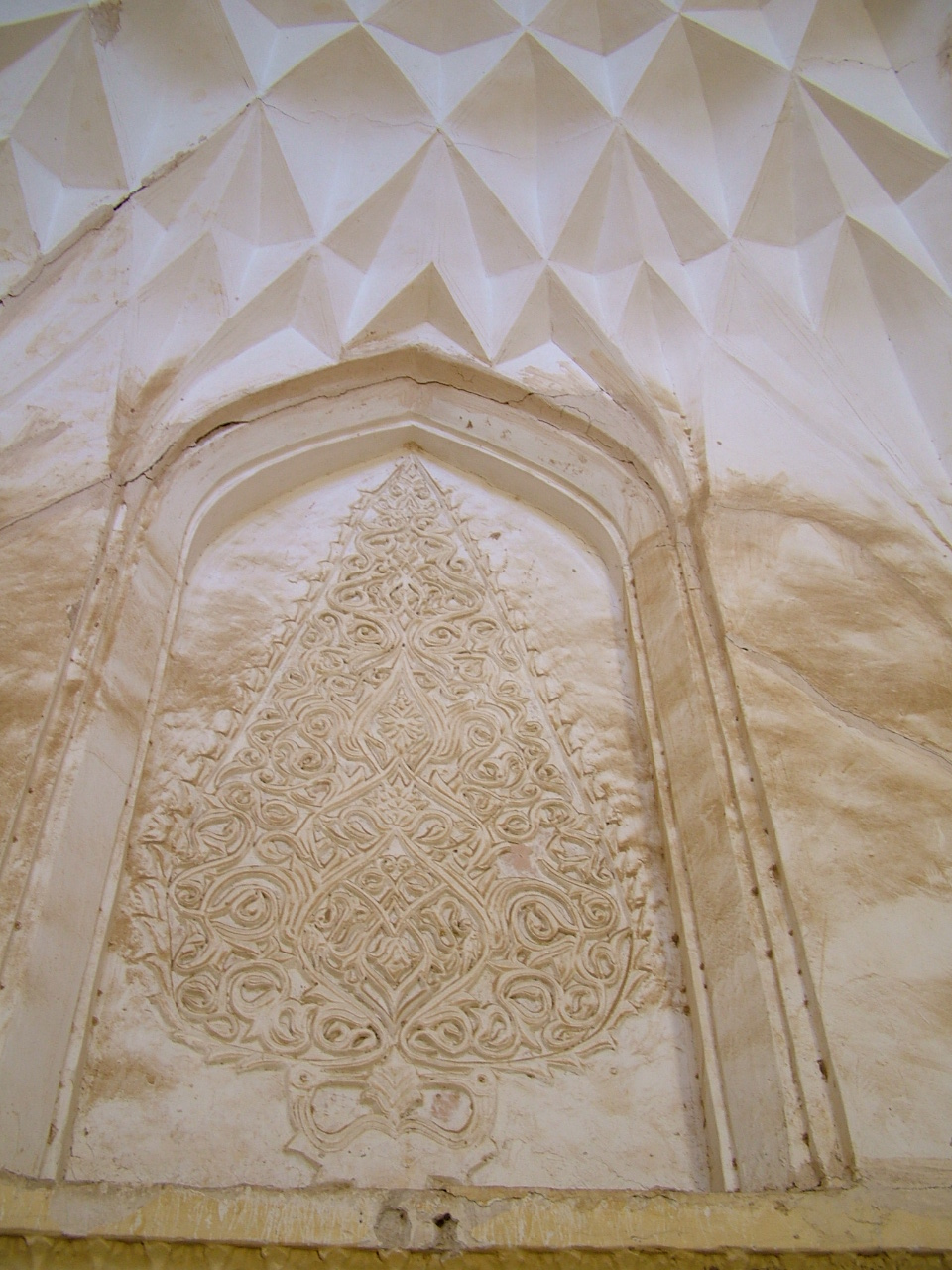

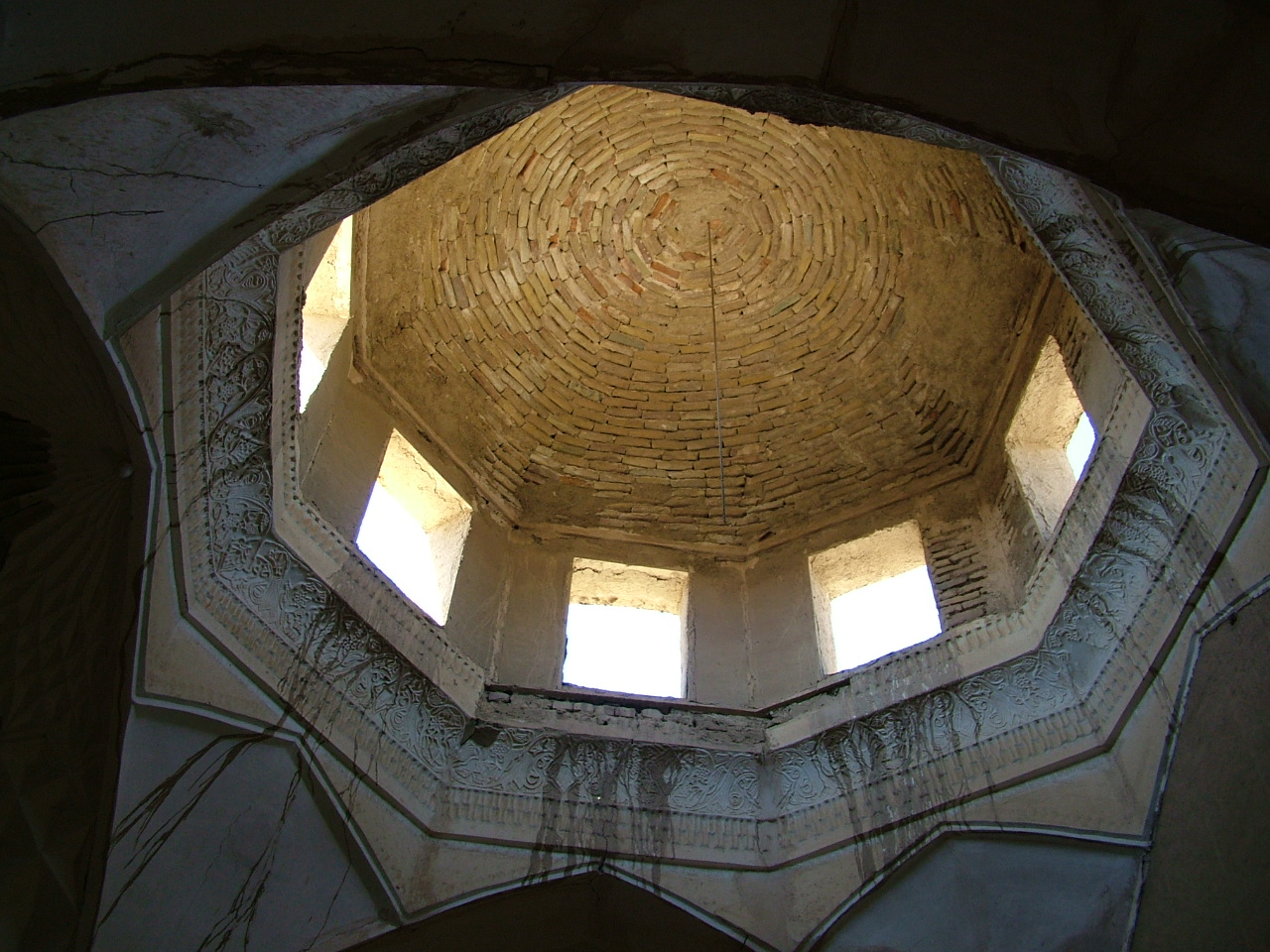

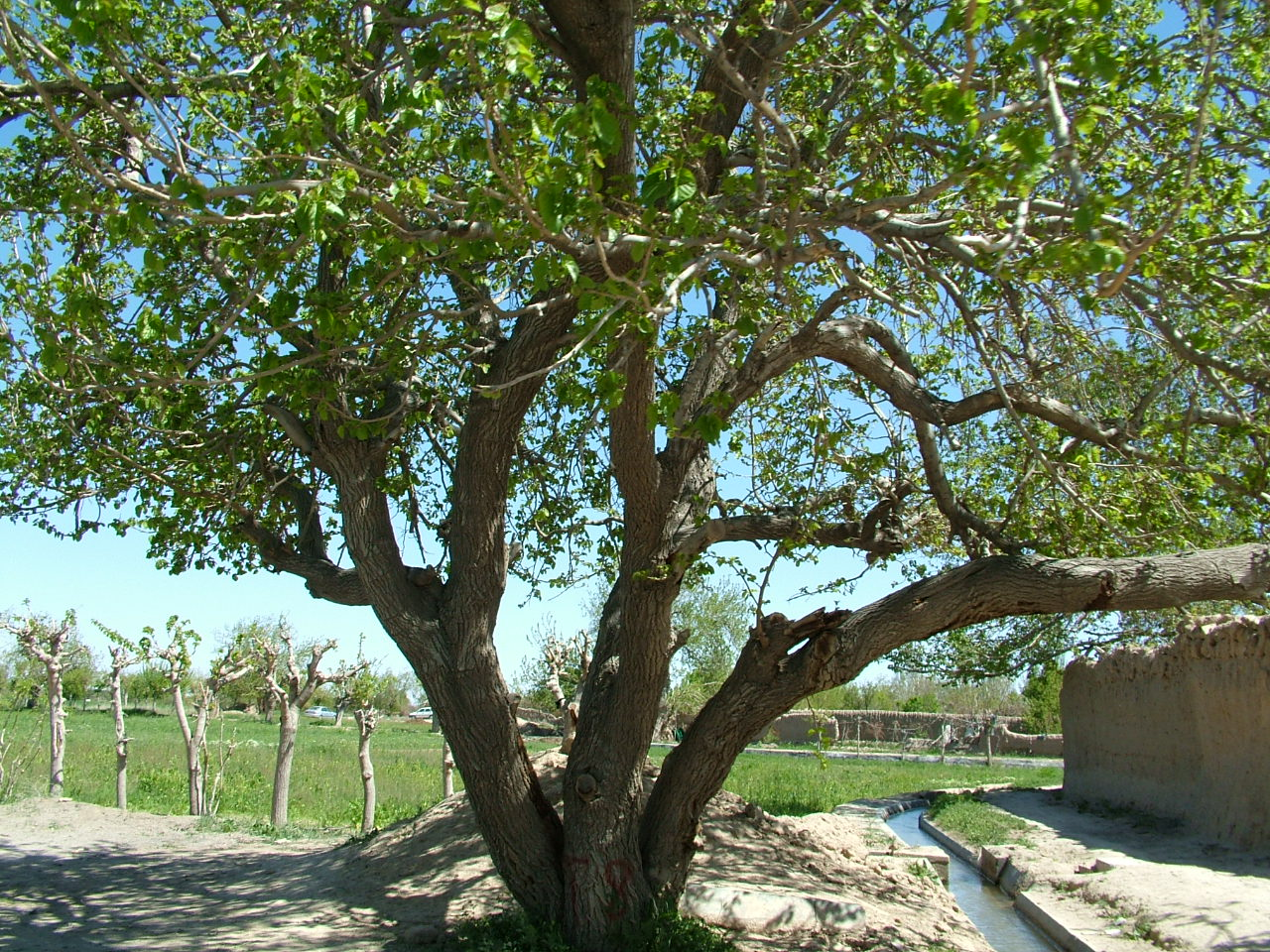

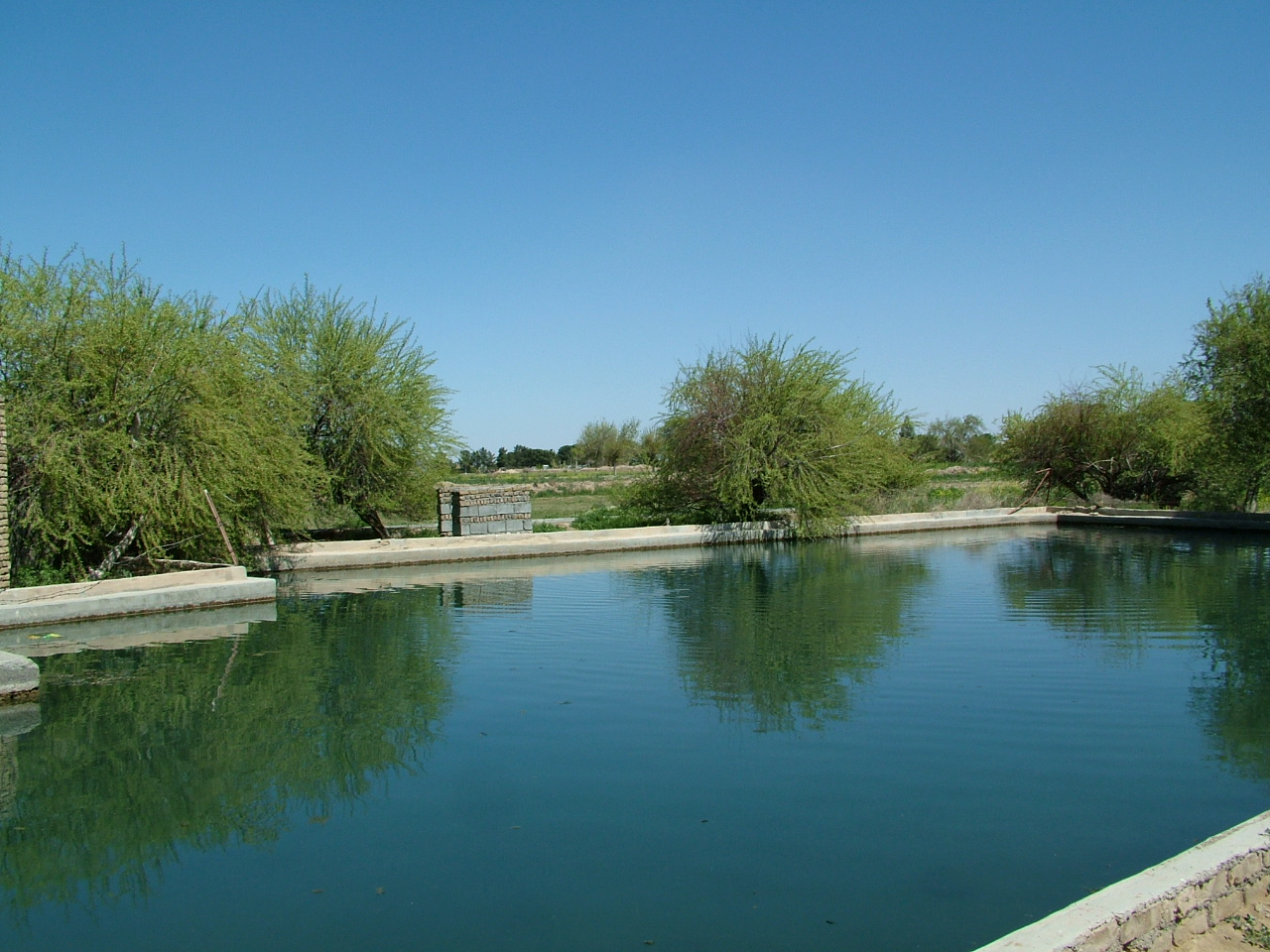

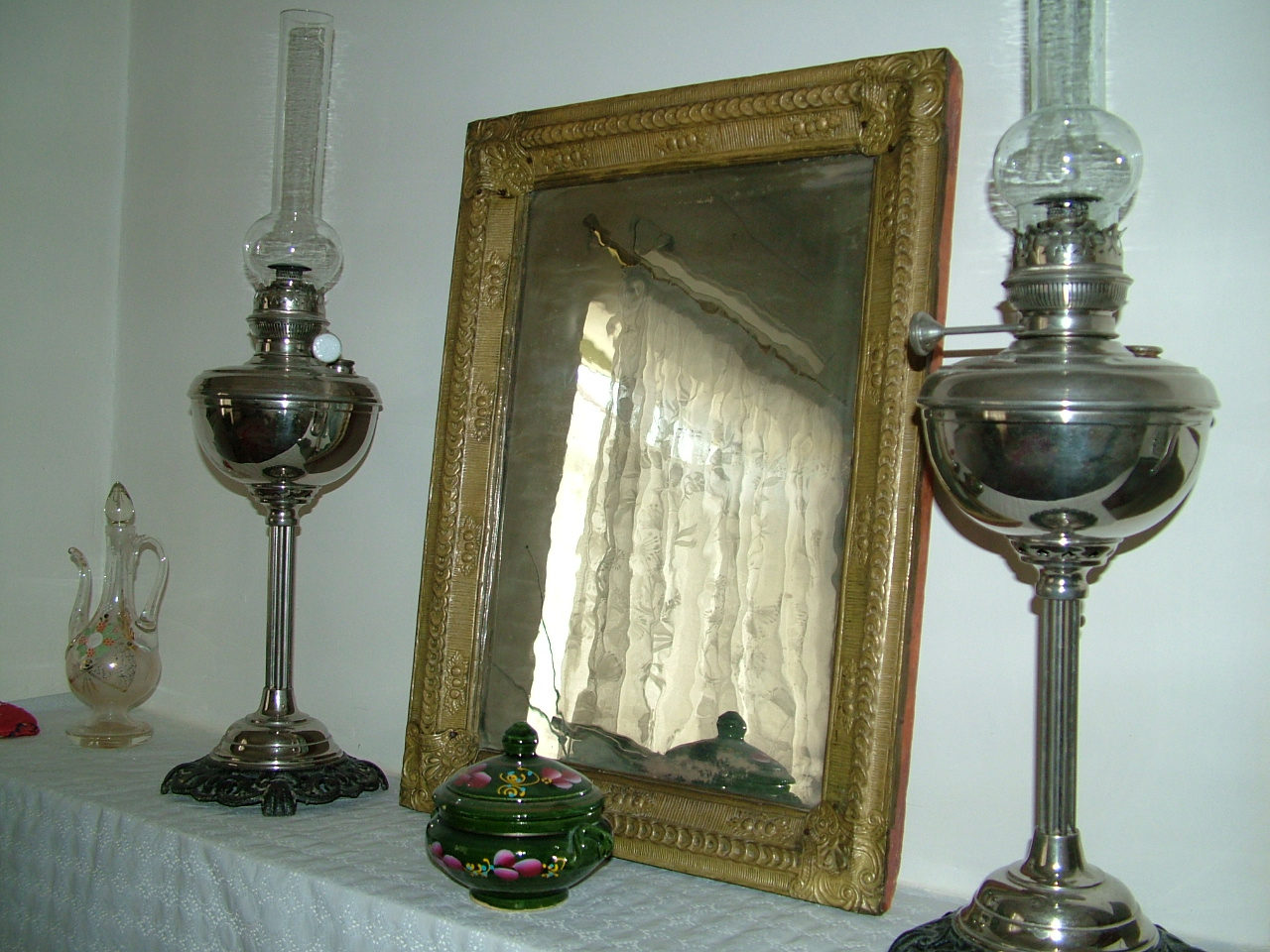
