= Deh Moghan =

Deh Moghan ده مغان
- Village
- Location within Iran
- Coordinates: 27°56′09″N 56°46′38″E
- Country: Iran
- Province: Hormozgan
- County: Hajjiabad
- Bakhsh: Ahmadi
- Rural District: Ahmadi

Population (2006)
  - Total: 37
- Time zone: UTC+3:30 (IRST)
  - Summer (DST): UTC+4:30 (IRDT)

Deh Moghan (Persian: ده مغان, also Romanized as Deh Moghān; also known as Daymoqān, Deymoghān, Deymoghū’īyeh, Deymoqū’īyeh, and Moghān) is a village in Ahmadi Rural District, Ahmadi District, Hajjiabad County, Hormozgan Province, Iran. At the 2006 census, its population was 37, in 10 families.
