= Kalateh-ye Molla, South Khorasan =

Kalateh-ye Molla كلاته ملا
- Village
- Location within Iran
- Coordinates: 33°13′02″N 59°44′47″E
- Country: Iran
- Province: South Khorasan
- County: Darmian
- Bakhsh: Qohestan
- Rural District: Qohestan

Population (2006)
  - Total: 239
- Time zone: UTC+3:30 (IRST)
  - Summer (DST): UTC+4:30 (IRDT)

Kalateh-ye Molla (Persian: كلاته ملا, also Romanized as Kalāteh-ye Mollā and Kalāteh-i-Mulla; also known as Mollā) is a village in Qohestan Rural District, Qohestan District, Darmian County, South Khorasan Province, Iran. At the 2006 census, its population was 239, in 69 families.
