= Torud, Semnan =

Village in Semnan province, Iran

Torud Persian: طرود
- Village
- Location within Iran
- Coordinates: 35°25′43″N 55°00′55″E
- Country: Iran
- Province: Semnan
- County: Shahrud
- District: Central
- Rural District: Torud

Population (2016)
  - Total: 1,813
- Time zone: UTC+3:30 (IRST)

Torud (Persian: طرود) (Note: Also romanized as Torūd and Ţorūd; also known as Touroud, Turūd, and Turut) is a village in, and the capital of, Torud Rural District in the Central District of Shahrud County, Semnan province, Iran.

== Demographics ==
=== Population ===
At the time of the 2006 National Census, the village's population was 1,901 in 410 households. The following census in 2011 counted 1,866 people in 481 households. The 2016 census measured the population of the village as 1,813 people in 509 households, the most populous in its rural district.
