= Torud Rural District =

Rural district in Semnan province, Iran

Torud Rural District Persian: دهستان طرود
- Rural District
- Location within Iran
- Coordinates: 35°16′N 55°10′E
- Country: Iran
- Province: Semnan
- County: Shahrud
- District: Central
- Established: 1987
- Capital: Torud

Population (2016)
  - Total: 3,381
- Time zone: UTC+3:30 (IRST)

Torud Rural District (Persian: دهستان طرود) is in the Central District of Shahrud County, Semnan province, Iran. Its capital is the village of Torud.

== Demographics ==
=== Population ===
At the time of the 2006 National Census, the rural district's population was 3,542 in 782 households. There were 3,500 inhabitants in 889 households at the following census of 2011. The 2016 census measured the population of the rural district as 3,381 in 941 households. The most populous of its 67 villages was Torud, with 1,813 people.

=== Other villages in the rural district ===
- Bidestan
- Cheshmeh Sefid
- Mehdiabad
- Sar Takht
- Satveh
- Zarki
