= Central District (Shahrud County) =

District in Semnan province, Iran

Central District (Shahrud County) Persian: بخش مرکزی شهرستان شاهرود
- District
- Location within Iran
- Coordinates: 35°21′N 55°08′E
- Country: Iran
- Province: Semnan
- County: Shahrud
- Capital: Shahrud

Population (2016)
  - Total: 166,963
- Time zone: UTC+3:30 (IRST)

The Central District of Shahrud County (Persian: بخش مرکزی شهرستان شاهرود) is in Semnan province, Iran. Its capital is the city of Shahrud.

== History ==
The village of Ruyan was converted to a city as Rudiyan in 2016, and was renamed Ruyan again in 2021.

== Demographics ==
=== Population ===
At the time of the 2006 census, the district's population was 142,663 in 39,805 households. The following census in 2011 counted 155,326 people in 45,464 households. The 2016 census measured the population of the rural district as 166,963 inhabitants in 52,694 households.

=== Administrative divisions ===
Central District (Shahrud County) Population
Administrative Divisions	2006	2011	2016
Dehmolla RD	2,197	1,797	2,317
Howmeh RD	10,008	9,555	7,366
Torud RD	3,542	3,500	3,381
Ruyan (city) (Note: Became the city of Rudiyan after the 2016 census; renamed Ruyan again)			3,770
Shahrud (city)	126,916	140,474	150,129
Total	142,663	155,326	166,963
RD = Rural District
