= Rezvan =

Rezvan (Persian: رضوان meaning: Paradise or The Gatekeeper of Paradise) may refer to:

- Rəzvan, Azerbaijan
- Rezvan, Gilan, Iran
- Rezvan, Hormozgan, Iran
- Rezvan, Kerman, Iran
- Rezvan, alternate name of Rezvanabad, Kerman Province, Iran
- Rezvan, Khuzestan, Iran
- Rezvan, Razavi Khorasan, Iran
- Rezvan, Semnan, Iran
- Rezvan, South Khorasan, Iran
- Rezvan Rural District (disambiguation), various places in Iran
- Rezvan missile, Iranian missile

== See also ==
- Rezvanshahr (disambiguation), various places in Iran
