= Meyami (disambiguation) =

Meyami is a city in Semnan Province, Iran.

Meyami (Persian: ميامي) may also refer to:

- Meyami, Razavi Khorasan
- Meyami County, an administrative subdivision in Semnan Province
- Meyami District, a former administrative subdivision of Semnan Province
- Meyami Rural District (disambiguation)
