= Ebrahimabad-e Sofla =

Village in Semnan province, Iran

Ebrahimabad-e Sofla Persian: ابراهيم آباد سفلا
- Village
- Location within Iran
- Coordinates: 36°25′18″N 55°42′38″E
- Country: Iran
- Province: Semnan
- County: Meyami
- District: Central
- Rural District: Meyami

Population (2016)
  - Total: 554
- Time zone: UTC+3:30 (IRST)

Ebrahimabad-e Sofla (Persian: ابراهيم آباد سفلا) (Note: Also romanized as Ebrāhīmābād-e Soflá) is a village in Meyami Rural District of the Central District in Meyami County, Semnan province, Iran.

== Demographics ==
=== Population ===
At the time of the 2006 National Census, the village's population was 400 in 121 households, when it was in the former Meyami District of Shahrud County. The following census in 2011 counted 268 people in 85 households. The 2016 census measured the population of the village as 554 people in 188 households, by which time the district had been separated from the county in the establishment of Meyami County. The rural district was transferred to the new Central District.
