= Talvin =

Village in Semnan province, Iran

Talvin Persian: تلوين
- Village
- Location within Iran
- Coordinates: 37°02′59″N 55°38′00″E
- Country: Iran
- Province: Semnan
- County: Meyami
- District: Kalpush
- Rural District: Nardin

Population (2016)
  - Total: 1,894
- Time zone: UTC+3:30 (IRST)

Talvin (Persian: تلوين) (Note: Also romanized as Talvīn) is a village in Nardin Rural District of Kalpush District in Meyami County, Semnan province, Iran.

== Demographics ==
=== Population ===
At the time of the 2006 National Census, the village's population was 1,875 in 499 households, when it was in the former Meyami District of Shahrud County. The following census in 2011 counted 1,965 people in 584 households. The 2016 census measured the population of the village as 1,894 people in 620 households, by which time the district had been separated from the county in the establishment of Meyami County. The rural district was transferred to the new Kalpush District.
