= Bakran =

Village in Semnan province, Iran

Bakran Persian: بكران
- Village
- Location within Iran
- Coordinates: 36°34′52″N 55°51′30″E
- Country: Iran
- Province: Semnan
- County: Meyami
- District: Central
- Rural District: Kalateh Hay-ye Sharqi

Population (2016)
  - Total: 1,266
- Time zone: UTC+3:30 (IRST)

Bakran (Persian: بكران) (Note: Also romanized as Bakrān and Bokrān) is a village in, and the capital of, Kalateh Hay-ye Sharqi Rural District in the Central District of Meyami County, Semnan province, Iran.

== Demographics ==
=== Population ===
At the time of the 2006 National Census, the village's population was 1,350 in 360 households, when it was in the former Meyami District of Shahrud County. The following census in 2011 counted 1,269 people in 406 households. The 2016 census measured the population of the village as 1,266 people in 425 households, by which time the district had been separated from the county in the establishment of Meyami County. The rural district was transferred to the new Central District. It was the most populous village in its rural district.
