= Dasht-e Shad =

Village in Semnan province, Iran

Dasht-e Shad Persian: دشت شاد
- Village
- Location within Iran
- Coordinates: 37°16′28″N 55°45′57″E
- Country: Iran
- Province: Semnan
- County: Meyami
- District: Kalpush
- Rural District: Rezvan

Population (2016)
  - Total: 1,201
- Time zone: UTC+3:30 (IRST)

Dasht-e Shad (Persian: دشت شاد) (Note: Also romanized as Dasht-e Shād; also known as Dast Shāh, Dast-e Shā, Dast-e Shāh, and Destisha) is a village in Rezvan Rural District (Note: Formerly Nardin Rural District) of Kalpush District in Meyami County, Semnan province, Iran.

== Demographics ==
=== Population ===
At the time of the 2006 National Census, the village's population was 1,224 in 288 households, when it was in the former Meyami District of Shahrud County. The following census in 2011 counted 1,245 people in 414 households. The 2016 census measured the population of the village as 1,201 people in 400 households, by which time the district had been separated from the county in the establishment of Meyami County. The rural district was transferred to the new Kalpush District.
