= Kalateh-ye Asad =

Village in Semnan province, Iran

Kalateh-ye Asad Persian: كلاته اسد
- Village
- Location within Iran
- Coordinates: 36°23′29″N 55°33′48″E
- Country: Iran
- Province: Semnan
- County: Meyami
- District: Central
- Rural District: Meyami

Population (2016)
  - Total: 1,385
- Time zone: UTC+3:30 (IRST)

Kalateh-ye Asad (Persian: كلاته اسد) (Note: Also romanized as Kalāteh-ye Asad) is a village in Meyami Rural District of the Central District in Meyami County, Semnan province, Iran.

== Demographics ==
=== Population ===
At the time of the 2006 National Census, the village's population was 1,125 in 297 households, when it was in the former Meyami District of Shahrud County. The following census in 2011 counted 999 people in 300 households. The 2016 census measured the population of the village as 1,385 people in 379 households, by which time the district had been separated from the county in the establishment of Meyami County. The rural district was transferred to the new Central District.
