= Chah-e Shirin, Semnan =

Village in Semnan province, Iran

Chah-e Shirin Persian: چاه شيرين
- Village
- Location within Iran
- Coordinates: 36°36′25″N 56°19′56″E
- Country: Iran
- Province: Semnan
- County: Meyami
- District: Central
- Rural District: Kalateh Hay-ye Sharqi

Population (2016)
  - Total: 200
- Time zone: UTC+3:30 (IRST)

Chah-e Shirin (Persian: چاه شيرين) (Note: Also romanized as Chāh-e Shīrīn) is a village in Kalateh Hay-ye Sharqi Rural District of the Central District in Meyami County, Semnan province, Iran.

== Demographics ==
=== Population ===
At the time of the 2006 National Census, the village's population was 219 in 47 households, when it was in the former Meyami District of Shahrud County. The following census in 2011 counted 212 people in 59 households. The 2016 census measured the population of the village as 200 people in 55 households, by which time the district had been separated from the county in the establishment of Meyami County. The rural district was transferred to the new Central District.
