= Reyabad =

Village in Semnan province, Iran

Reyabad Persian: ري آباد
- Village
- Location within Iran
- Coordinates: 36°42′06″N 55°48′44″E
- Country: Iran
- Province: Semnan
- County: Meyami
- District: Central
- Rural District: Kalateh Hay-ye Sharqi

Population (2016)
  - Total: 514
- Time zone: UTC+3:30 (IRST)

Reyabad (Persian: ري آباد) (Note: Also romanized as Reyābād and Riābād) is a village in Kalateh Hay-ye Sharqi Rural District of the Central District in Meyami County, Semnan province, Iran.

== Demographics ==
=== Population ===
At the time of the 2006 National Census, the village's population was 408 in 139 households, when it was in the former Meyami District of Shahrud County. The following census in 2011 counted 357 people in 130 households. The 2016 census measured the population of the village as 514 people in 179 households, by which time the district had been separated from the county in the establishment of Meyami County. The rural district was transferred to the new Central District.
