= Masihabad, Semnan =

Village in Semnan province, Iran

Masihabad Persian: مسيح آباد
- Village
- Location within Iran
- Coordinates: 36°29′55″N 56°29′38″E
- Country: Iran
- Province: Semnan
- County: Meyami
- District: Central
- Rural District: Farumad

Population (2016)
  - Total: 74
- Time zone: UTC+3:30 (IRST)

Masihabad (Persian: مسيح آباد) (Note: Also romanized as Masīḩābād) is a village in Farumad Rural District of the Central District in Meyami County, Semnan province, Iran.

== Demographics ==
=== Population ===
At the time of the 2006 National Census, the village's population was 100 in 21 households, when it was in the former Meyami District of Shahrud County. The following census in 2011 counted 101 people in 24 households. The 2016 census measured the population of the village as 74 people in 23 households, by which time the district had been separated from the county in the establishment of Meyami County. The rural district was transferred to the new Central District.
