= Hoseynabad, Kalateh Hay-ye Sharqi =

Village in Semnan province, Iran

Hoseynabad Persian: حسين آباد
- Village
- Location within Iran
- Coordinates: 36°33′25″N 55°48′49″E
- Country: Iran
- Province: Semnan
- County: Meyami
- District: Central
- Rural District: Kalateh Hay-ye Sharqi

Population (2016)
  - Total: 229
- Time zone: UTC+3:30 (IRST)

Hoseynabad (Persian: حسين آباد) (Note: Also romanized as Ḩoseynābād) is a village in Kalateh Hay-ye Sharqi Rural District of the Central District in Meyami County, Semnan province, Iran.

== Demographics ==
=== Population ===
At the time of the 2006 National Census, the village's population was 272 in 72 households, when it was in the former Meyami District of Shahrud County. The following census in 2011 counted 240 people in 69 households. The 2016 census measured the population of the village as 229 people in 77 households, by which time the district had been separated from the county in the establishment of Meyami County. The rural district was transferred to the new Central District.
