= Kalateh-ye Mir Alam =

Village in Semnan province, Iran

Kalateh-ye Mir Alam Persian: کلاته مير اعلم
- Village
- Location within Iran
- Coordinates: 36°30′13″N 56°38′30″E
- Country: Iran
- Province: Semnan
- County: Meyami
- District: Central
- Rural District: Farumad

Population (2016)
  - Total: 100
- Time zone: UTC+3:30 (IRST)

Kalateh-ye Mir Alam (Persian: کلاته مير اعلم) (Note: Also romanized as Kalāteh-ye Mīr ‘Alam; formerly known as Kalateh-ye Mir Al (کلاته ميراعل), also romanized as Kalāteh-ye Mīr Āʿl) is a village in Farumad Rural District of the Central District in Meyami County, Semnan province, Iran.

== Demographics ==
=== Population ===
At the time of the 2006 National Census, the village's population, as Kalateh-ye Mir Al, was 115 in 31 households, when it was in the former Meyami District of Shahrud County. The following census in 2011 counted 69 people in 25 households, by which time the village was listed as Kalateh-ye Mir Alam. The 2016 census measured the population of the village as 100 people in 32 households, by which time the district had been separated from the county in the establishment of Meyami County. The rural district was transferred to the new Central District.
