= Golestan, Semnan =

Village in Semnan province, Iran

Golestan Persian: گلستان
- Village
- Location within Iran
- Country: Iran
- Province: Semnan
- County: Meyami
- District: Kalpush
- Rural District: Nardin

Population (2016)
  - Total: 519
- Time zone: UTC+3:30 (IRST)

Golestan (Persian: گلستان) (Note: Also romanized as Golestān) is a village in Nardin Rural District of Kalpush District in Meyami County, Semnan province, Iran.

== Demographics ==
=== Population ===
At the time of the 2006 National Census, the village's population was 419 in 116 households, when it was in the former Meyami District of Shahrud County. The following census in 2011 counted 527 people in 163 households. The 2016 census measured the population of the village as 519 people in 161 households, by which time the district had been separated from the county in the establishment of Meyami County. The rural district was transferred to the new Kalpush District.
