= Mirhajj =

Village in Semnan province, Iran

Mirhajj Persian: ميرحاج
- Village
- Country: Iran
- Province: Semnan
- County: Meyami
- District: Central
- Rural District: Farumad

Population (2016)
  - Total: 46
- Time zone: UTC+3:30 (IRST)

Mirhajj (Persian: ميرحاج) (Note: Also romanized as Mīrḥājj) is a village in Farumad Rural District of the Central District in Meyami County, Semnan province, Iran.

== Demographics ==
=== Population ===
At the time of the 2006 National Census, the village's population was 61 in 18 households, when it was in the former Meyami District of Shahrud County. The following census in 2011 counted 74 people in 22 households. The 2016 census measured the population of the village as 46 people in 14 households, by which time the district had been separated from the county in the establishment of Meyami County. The rural district was transferred to the new Central District.
