= Hoseynabad-e Kalpush =

Village in Semnan province, Iran

Hoseynabad-e Kalpush Persian: حسين آباد کالپوش
- Village
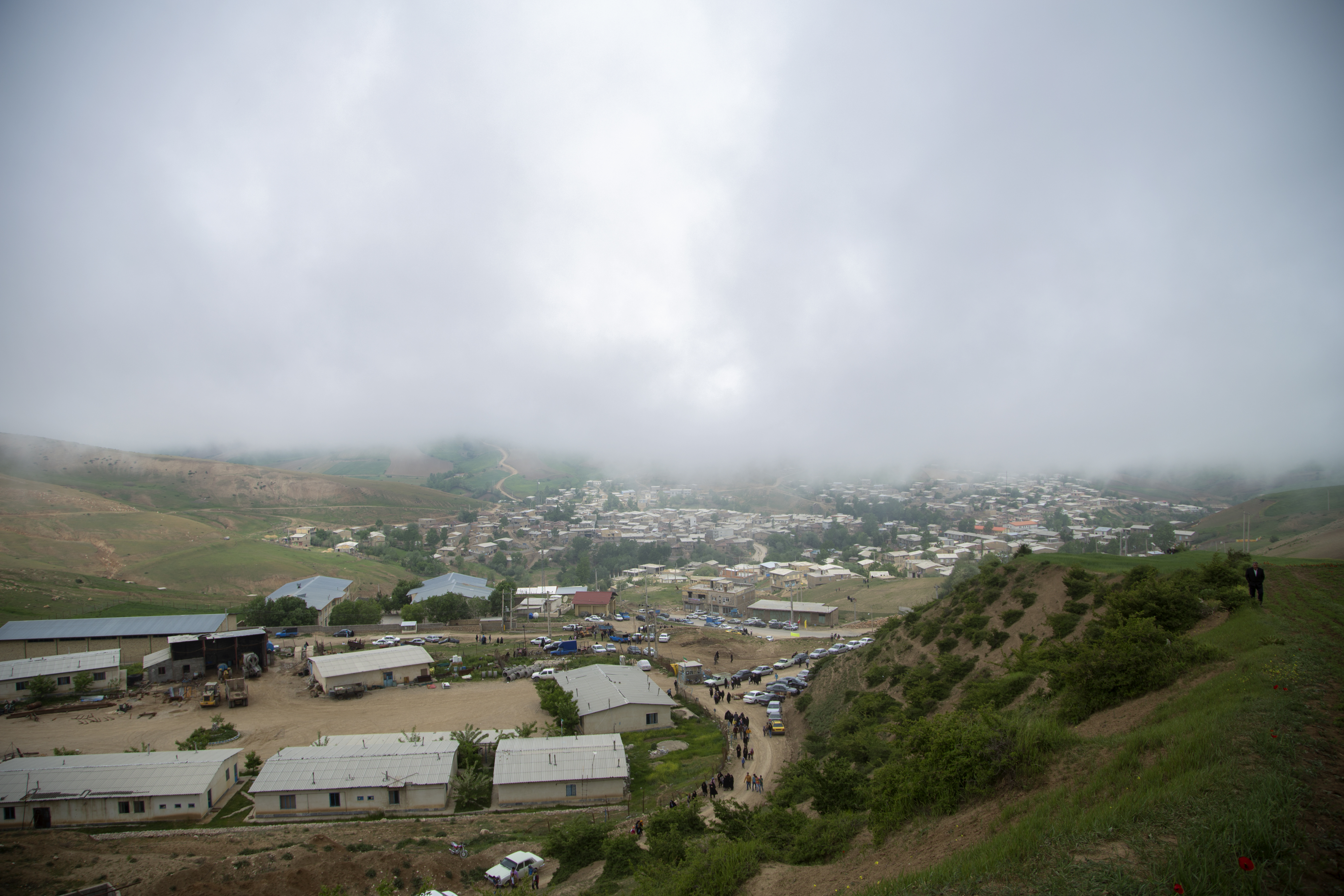

- Location within Iran
- Coordinates: 37°11′56″N 55°44′10″E
- Country: Iran
- Province: Semnan
- County: Meyami
- District: Kalpush
- Rural District: Rezvan

Population (2016)
  - Total: 3,514
- Time zone: UTC+3:30 (IRST)

Hoseynabad-e Kalpush (Persian: حسين آباد کالپوش) (Note: Also romanized as Ḩoseynābād-e Kālpūsh; formerly known as Hoseynabad-e Kalpu (حسين آباد کالپو), also romanized as Ḩoseynābād-e Kālpū; also known as Ḩoseynābād) is a village in Rezvan Rural District (Note: Formerly Nardin Rural District) of Kalpush District in Meyami County, Semnan province, Iran.

== Demographics ==
=== Population ===
At the time of the 2006 National Census, the village's population, as Hoseynabad-e Kalpu, was 3,242 in 734 households, when it was in the former Meyami District of Shahrud County. The following census in 2011 counted 3,889 people in 946 households, by which time the village was listed as Hoseynabad-e Kalpush. The 2016 census measured the population of the village as 3,514 people in 1,013 households, when the district had been separated from the county in the establishment of Meyami County. The rural district was transferred to the new Kalpush District. It was the most populous village in its rural district.
