= Firuzabad-e Bala =

Village in Semnan province, Iran

Firuzabad-e Bala Persian: فيروز آباد بالا
- Village
- Location within Iran
- Coordinates: 36°30′28″N 56°37′51″E
- Country: Iran
- Province: Semnan
- County: Meyami
- District: Central
- Rural District: Farumad

Population (2016)
  - Total: 41
- Time zone: UTC+3:30 (IRST)

Firuzabad-e Bala (Persian: فيروز آباد بالا) (Note: Also romanized as Fīrūzābād Bālā, and Fīrūzābād-e Bālā; also known as Fīrūzābād) is a village in Farumad Rural District of the Central District in Meyami County, Semnan province, Iran.

== Demographics ==
=== Population ===
At the time of the 2006 National Census, the village's population was 103 in 31 households, when it was in the former Meyami District of Shahrud County. The following census in 2011 counted 51 people in 22 households. The 2016 census measured the population of the village as 41 people in 17 households, by which time the district had been separated from the county in the establishment of Meyami County. The rural district was transferred to the new Central District.
