= Kordabad, Semnan =

Village in Semnan province, Iran

Kordabad Persian: کرد آباد
- Village
- Location within Iran
- Coordinates: 36°37′27″N 55°49′09″E
- Country: Iran
- Province: Semnan
- County: Meyami
- District: Central
- Rural District: Kalateh Hay-ye Sharqi

Population (2016)
  - Total: 401
- Time zone: UTC+3:30 (IRST)

Kordabad (Persian: کرد آباد) (Note: Also romanized as Kordābād) is a village in Kalateh Hay-ye Sharqi Rural District of the Central District in Meyami County, Semnan province, Iran.

== Demographics ==
=== Population ===
At the time of the 2006 National Census, the village's population was 595 in 164 households, when it was in the former Meyami District of Shahrud County. The following census in 2011 counted 479 people in 168 households. The 2016 census measured the population of the village as 401 people in 145 households, by which time the district had been separated from the county in the establishment of Meyami County. The rural district was transferred to the new Central District.
