= Qowsheh Degarman =

Village in Semnan province, Iran

Qowsheh Degarman Persian: قوشه دگرمان
- Village
- Location within Iran
- Coordinates: 37°10′18″N 55°43′13″E
- Country: Iran
- Province: Semnan
- County: Meyami
- District: Kalpush
- Rural District: Rezvan

Population (2016)
  - Total: 345
- Time zone: UTC+3:30 (IRST)

Qowsheh Degarman (Persian: قوشه دگرمان) (Note: Also romanized as Qowsheh Degarmān and Qūsheh Degermān) is a village in Rezvan Rural District (Note: Formerly Nardin Rural District) of Kalpush District in Meyami County, Semnan province, Iran.

== Demographics ==
=== Population ===
At the time of the 2006 National Census, the village's population was 315 in 78 households, when it was in the former Meyami District of Shahrud County. The following census in 2011 counted 347 people in 105 households. The 2016 census measured the population of the village as 345 people in 113 households, by which time the district had been separated from the county in the establishment of Meyami County. The rural district was transferred to the new Kalpush District.
