= Hunestan =

Village in Semnan province, Iran

Hunestan Persian: هونستان
- Village
- Location within Iran
- Coordinates: 36°34′29″N 55°50′53″E
- Country: Iran
- Province: Semnan
- County: Meyami
- District: Central
- Rural District: Kalateh Hay-ye Sharqi

Population (2016)
  - Total: 876
- Time zone: UTC+3:30 (IRST)

Hunestan (Persian: هونستان) (Note: Also romanized as Hūnestān; also known as Honestān, Hūnistān, Khonestān, and Khūnistān) is a village in Kalateh Hay-ye Sharqi Rural District of the Central District in Meyami County, Semnan province, Iran.

== Demographics ==
=== Population ===
At the time of the 2006 National Census, the village's population was 958 in 269 households, when it was in the former Meyami District of Shahrud County. The following census in 2011 counted 886 people in 290 households. The 2016 census measured the population of the village as 876 people in 303 households, by which time the district had been separated from the county in the establishment of Meyami County. The rural district was transferred to the new Central District.
