= Baghcheh, Semnan =

Village in Semnan province, Iran

Baghcheh Persian: باغچه
- Village
- Location within Iran
- Coordinates: 37°12′57″N 55°48′52″E
- Country: Iran
- Province: Semnan
- County: Meyami
- District: Kalpush
- Rural District: Rezvan

Population (2016)
  - Total: 1,301
- Time zone: UTC+3:30 (IRST)

Baghcheh (Persian: باغچه) (Note: Also romanized as Bāghcheh) is a village in Rezvan Rural District (Note: Formerly Nardin Rural District) of Kalpush District in Meyami County, Semnan province, Iran.

== Demographics ==
=== Population ===
At the time of the 2006 National Census, the village's population was 1,149 in 252 households, when it was in the former Meyami District of Shahrud County. The following census in 2011 counted 1,163 people in 341 households. The 2016 census measured the population of the village as 1,301 people in 405 households, by which time the district had been separated from the county in the establishment of Meyami County. The rural district was transferred to the new Kalpush District.
