= Hemmatabad, Semnan =

Village in Semnan province, Iran

Hemmatabad Persian: همت آباد
- Village
- Location within Iran
- Country: Iran
- Province: Semnan
- County: Meyami
- District: Central
- Rural District: Meyami

Population (2016)
  - Total: 67
- Time zone: UTC+3:30 (IRST)

Hemmatabad (Persian: همت آباد) (Note: Also romanized as Hemmatābād) is a village in Meyami Rural District of the Central District in Meyami County, Semnan province, Iran.

== Demographics ==
=== Population ===
At the time of the 2006 National Census, the village's population was 69 in 20 households, when it was in the former Meyami District of Shahrud County. The following census in 2011 counted 24 people in nine households. The 2016 census measured the population of the village as 67 people in 23 households, by which time the district had been separated from the county in the establishment of Meyami County. The rural district was transferred to the new Central District.
