= Abbasabad, Semnan =

Village in Semnan province, Iran

Abbasabad Persian: عباس آباد
- Village
- Location within Iran
- Coordinates: 36°21′40″N 56°23′16″E
- Country: Iran
- Province: Semnan
- County: Meyami
- District: Central
- Rural District: Meyami

Population (2016)
  - Total: 438
- Time zone: UTC+3:30 (IRST)

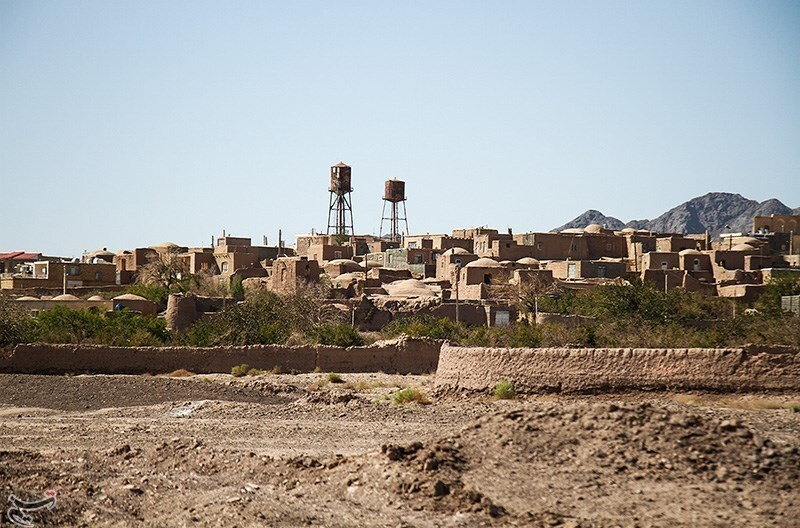
Semnan: Shah Abbasi Caravanserai

Abbasabad (Persian: عباس آباد) (Note: Also romanized as ‘Abbāsābād; formerly known as Abbas Aba (عباس آبا), also romanized as ‘Abbās Ābā) is a village in Meyami Rural District of the Central District in Meyami County, Semnan province, Iran.

== Demographics ==
=== Population ===
At the time of the 2006 National Census, the village's population, as Abbas Aba, was 458 in 132 households, when it was in the former Meyami District of Shahrud County. The following census in 2011 counted 320 people in 100 households, by which time the village was listed as Abbasabad. The 2016 census measured the population of the village as 438 people in 148 households, when the district had been separated from the county in the establishment of Meyami County. The rural district was transferred to the new Central District.
