= Judaneh =

Village in Semnan province, Iran

Judaneh Persian: جودانه
- Village
- Location within Iran
- Coordinates: 36°22′57″N 55°30′32″E
- Country: Iran
- Province: Semnan
- County: Meyami
- District: Central
- Rural District: Meyami

Population (2016)
  - Total: 970
- Time zone: UTC+3:30 (IRST)

Judaneh (Persian: جودانه) (Note: Also romanized as Jūdāneh) is a village in Meyami Rural District of the Central District in Meyami County, Semnan province, Iran.

== Demographics ==
=== Population ===
At the time of the 2006 National Census, the village's population was 1,185 in 333 households, when it was in the former Meyami District of Shahrud County. The following census in 2011 counted 537 people in 166 households. The 2016 census measured the population of the village as 970 people in 352 households, by which time the district had been separated from the county in the establishment of Meyami County. The rural district was transferred to the new Central District.
