= Nardin =

Nardin may refer to:

- Nardin (surname)
- Nardostachys, a flowering plant, or spikenard, the essential oil derived from that plant.
- Nardin, Iran, a village in Semnan Province, Iran
- Nardin Rural District, an administrative subdivision of Semnan Province, Iran
- Nardin, Oklahoma, a census-designated place and unincorporated community in the United States
- Nardin Park United Methodist Church in Michigan, United States
- Nardin Academy, a private Roman Catholic school in Western New York
- Ulysse Nardin, Swiss watch manufacturer
