= Firuzabad-e Pain =

Village in Semnan province, Iran

Firuzabad-e Pain Persian: فيروز آباد پايين
- Village
- Location within Iran
- Coordinates: 36°29′52″N 56°37′42″E
- Country: Iran
- Province: Semnan
- County: Meyami
- District: Central
- Rural District: Farumad

Population (2016)
  - Total: 327
- Time zone: UTC+3:30 (IRST)

Firuzabad-e Pain (Persian: فيروز آباد پايين) (Note: Also romanized as Fīrūzābād-e Pā’īn) is a village in Farumad Rural District of the Central District in Meyami County, Semnan province, Iran.

== Demographics ==
=== Population ===
At the time of the 2006 National Census, the village's population was 398 in 120 households, when it was in the former Meyami District of Shahrud County. The following census in 2011 counted 298 people in 100 households. The 2016 census measured the population of the village as 327 people in 94 households, by which time the district had been separated from the county in the establishment of Meyami County. The rural district was transferred to the new Central District.
