= Cheshmeh Sefid, Meyami =

Cheshmeh Sefid چشمه سفيد
- Village
- Location within Iran
- Coordinates: 36°18′00″N 56°19′00″E
- Country: Iran
- Province: Semnan
- County: Meyami
- Bakhsh: Central
- Rural District: Meyami

Population (2006)
  - Total: 120
- Time zone: UTC+3:30 (IRST)
  - Summer (DST): UTC+4:30 (IRDT)

Cheshmeh Sefid (Persian: چشمه سفيد, also Romanized as Cheshmeh Sefīd) is a village in Meyami Rural District, in the Central District of Meyami County, Semnan Province, Iran. At the 2006 census, its population was 120, in 33 families.
