= Armian =

Village in Semnan province, Iran

Armian Persian: ارميان
- Village
- Location within Iran
- Coordinates: 36°21′32″N 55°24′12″E
- Country: Iran
- Province: Semnan
- County: Meyami
- District: Central
- Rural District: Meyami

Population (2016)
  - Total: 278
- Time zone: UTC+3:30 (IRST)

Armian (Persian: ارميان) (Note: Also romanized as Armeyān, Armīān, and Armīyān) is a village in Meyami Rural District of the Central District in Meyami County, Semnan province, Iran.

== Demographics ==
=== Population ===
At the time of the 2006 National Census, the village's population was 599 in 158 households, when it was in the former Meyami District of Shahrud County. The following census in 2011 counted 151 people in 52 households. The 2016 census measured the population of the village as 278 people in 104 households, by which time the district had been separated from the county in the establishment of Meyami County. The rural district was transferred to the new Central District.
