= Kamardar =

Village in Semnan province, Iran

Kamardar Persian: كمردار
- Village
- Location within Iran
- Coordinates: 37°14′24″N 55°46′41″E
- Country: Iran
- Province: Semnan
- County: Meyami
- District: Kalpush
- Rural District: Rezvan

Population (2016)
  - Total: 122
- Time zone: UTC+3:30 (IRST)

Kamardar (Persian: كمردار) (Note: Also romanized as Kamardār) is a village in Rezvan Rural District (Note: Formerly Nardin Rural District) of Kalpush District in Meyami County, Semnan province, Iran.

== Demographics ==
=== Population ===
At the time of the 2006 National Census, the village's population was 139 in 27 households, when it was in the former Meyami District of Shahrud County. The following census in 2011 counted 81 people in 21 households. The 2016 census measured the population of the village as 122 people in 37 households, by which time the district had been separated from the county in the establishment of Meyami County. The rural district was transferred to the new Kalpush District.
