= Mohammadabad, Meyami =

Village in Semnan province, Iran

Mohammadabad Persian: محمد آباد
- Village
- Location within Iran
- Coordinates: 36°22′53″N 55°31′52″E
- Country: Iran
- Province: Semnan
- County: Meyami
- District: Central
- Rural District: Meyami

Population (2016)
  - Total: 1,397
- Time zone: UTC+3:30 (IRST)

Mohammadabad (Persian: محمد آباد) (Note: Also romanized as Moḩammadābād; also known as Muhammadābād) is a village in Meyami Rural District of the Central District in Meyami County, Semnan province, Iran.

== Demographics ==
=== Population ===
At the time of the 2006 National Census, the village's population was 976 in 274 households, when it was in the former Meyami District of Shahrud County. The following census in 2011 counted 1,287 people in 409 households. The 2016 census measured the population of the village as 1,397 people in 476 households, by which time the district had been separated from the county in the establishment of Meyami County. The rural district was transferred to the new Central District. It was the most populous village in its rural district.
