= Estarband =

Village in Semnan province, Iran

Estarband Persian: استربند
- Village
- Location within Iran
- Coordinates: 36°27′33″N 56°39′57″E
- Country: Iran
- Province: Semnan
- County: Meyami
- District: Central
- Rural District: Farumad

Population (2016)
  - Total: 244
- Time zone: UTC+3:30 (IRST)

Estarband (Persian: استربند) (Note: Also romanized as Esterband; also known as Estarbad) is a village in Farumad Rural District of the Central District in Meyami County, Semnan province, Iran.

== Demographics ==
=== Population ===
At the time of the 2006 National Census, the village's population was 334 in 93 households, when it was in the former Meyami District of Shahrud County. The following census in 2011 counted 245 people in 87 households. The 2016 census measured the population of the village as 244 people in 85 households, by which time the district had been separated from the county in the establishment of Meyami County. The rural district was transferred to the new Central District.
