= Haq ol Khvajeh =

Village in Semnan province, Iran

Haq ol Khvajeh Persian: حق الخواجه
- Village
- Location within Iran
- Coordinates: 37°08′57″N 55°59′27″E
- Country: Iran
- Province: Semnan
- County: Meyami
- District: Kalpush
- Rural District: Nardin

Population (2016)
  - Total: 741
- Time zone: UTC+3:30 (IRST)

Haq ol Khvajeh (Persian: حق الخواجه) (Note: Also romanized as Ḩaq ol Khvājeh, Ḩaqq el Khvājeh, and Ḩaqq ol Khvājeh; also known as Āghel Khvājeh, Akīl Khvājeh, ‘Aqel Khvājeh, ‘Aqīl Khvājeh, and Haq-ol-Khayajeh) is a village in Nardin Rural District of Kalpush District in Meyami County, Semnan province, Iran.

== Demographics ==
=== Population ===
At the time of the 2006 National Census, the village's population was 481 in 128 households, when it was in the former Meyami District of Shahrud County. The following census in 2011 counted 718 people in 230 households. The 2016 census measured the population of the village as 741 people in 235 households, by which time the district had been separated from the county in the establishment of Meyami County. The rural district was transferred to the new Kalpush District.
