= Ebrahimabad-e Olya =

Village in Semnan province, Iran

Ebrahimabad-e Olya Persian: ابراهيم آباد عليا
- Village
- Location within Iran
- Coordinates: 36°24′55″N 55°43′28″E
- Country: Iran
- Province: Semnan
- County: Meyami
- District: Central
- Rural District: Meyami

Population (2016)
  - Total: 1,284
- Time zone: UTC+3:30 (IRST)

Ebrahimabad-e Olya (Persian: ابراهيم آباد عليا) (Note: Also romanized as Ebrāhīmābād-e ‘Olyā) is a village in, and the capital of, Meyami Rural District in the Central District of Meyami County, Semnan province, Iran. The rural district was previously administered from the city of Meyami.

== Demographics ==
=== Population ===
At the time of the 2006 National Census, the village's population was 1,022 in 263 households, when it was in the former Meyami District of Shahrud County. The following census in 2011 counted 1,276 people in 364 households. The 2016 census measured the population of the village as 1,284 people in 409 households, by which time the district had been separated from the county in the establishment of Meyami County. The rural district was transferred to the new Central District.
