= Jameh Mosque of Farumad =

Former mosque in Farumad, Semnan province, Iran

Jāmeh Mosque of Farumad
- مسجد جامع فرومد
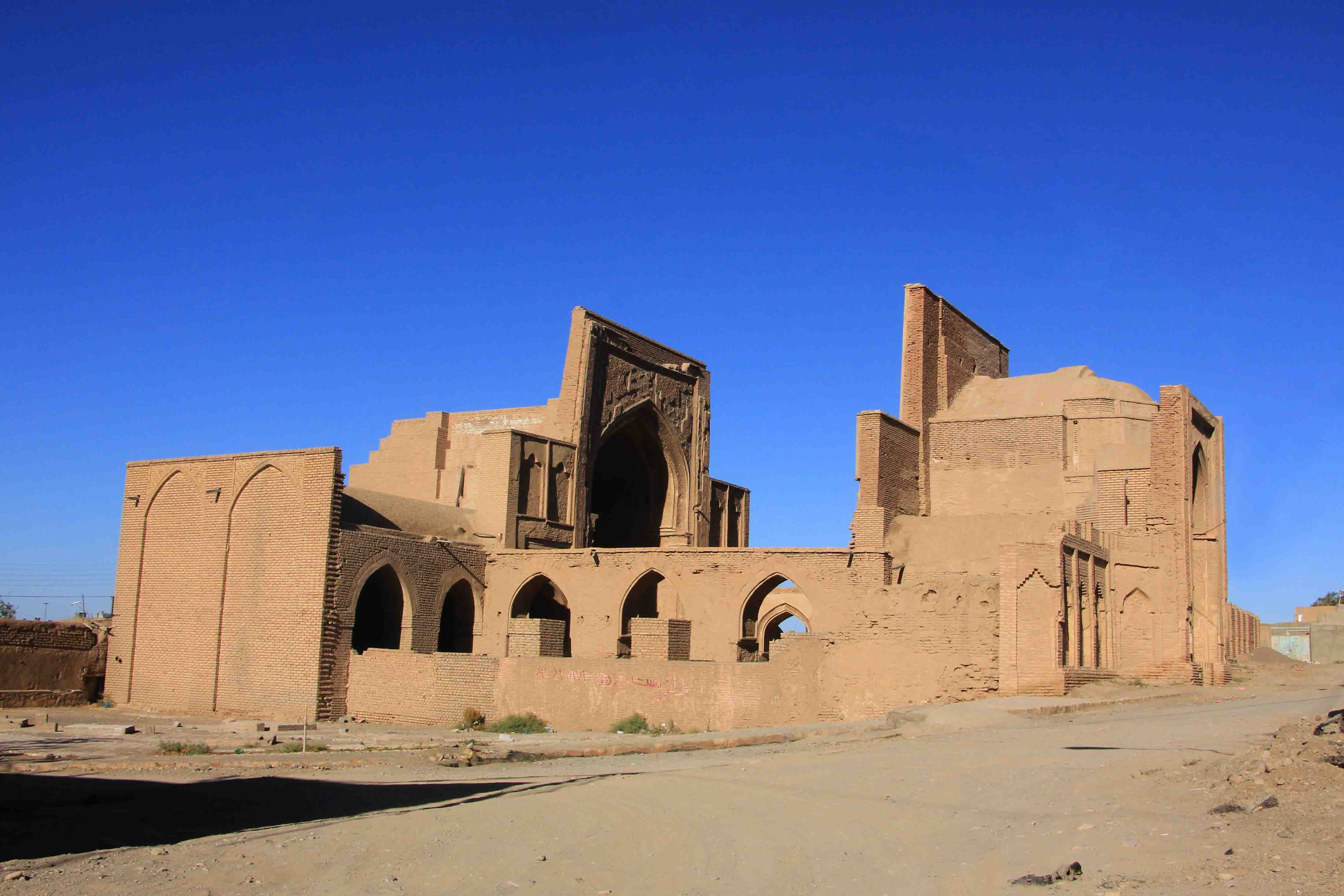
- Partial ruins of the former mosque in 2016

- Location of the former mosque in Iran

Religion
- Affiliation: Islam (former)
- Ecclesiastical or organisational status: Friday mosque
- Status: Inactive (partial ruinous state)

Location
- Location: Farumad, Meyami County, Semnan Province
- Country: Iran
- Coordinates: 36°30′47″N 56°45′1″E

Architecture
- Type: Mosque architecture
- Style: Seljuk; Khwarazmian (renovation); Ilkhanid (reconstruction)
- Completed: 7th century AH (12th century CE); 1320 CE (reconstruction)

Specifications
- Interior area: 820 m^{2} (8,800 sq ft)
- Dome: One (maybe more)
- Materials: Bricks; plaster; tiles

Iran National Heritage List
- Official name: Friday Mosque of Farumad
- Type: Friday Mosque
- Designated: 1942
- Reference no.: 345
- Conservation organization: Cultural Heritage, Handicrafts and Tourism Organization of Iran

The Jāmeh Mosque of Farumad (Persian: مسجد جامع فرومد) is a former Friday mosque (jāmeh) now in partial ruins, located in Farumad, (Note: Variously spelled as Faryumad and Forumad.) in the county of Meyami, in the province of Semnan, Iran. The former mosque was completed during the 7th century AH (12th century CE) and was reconstructed during the Ilkhanate era.

The remains of the former mosque were added to the Iran National Heritage List on 10 June 1942, administered by the Cultural Heritage, Handicrafts and Tourism Organization of Iran.

== Gallery ==
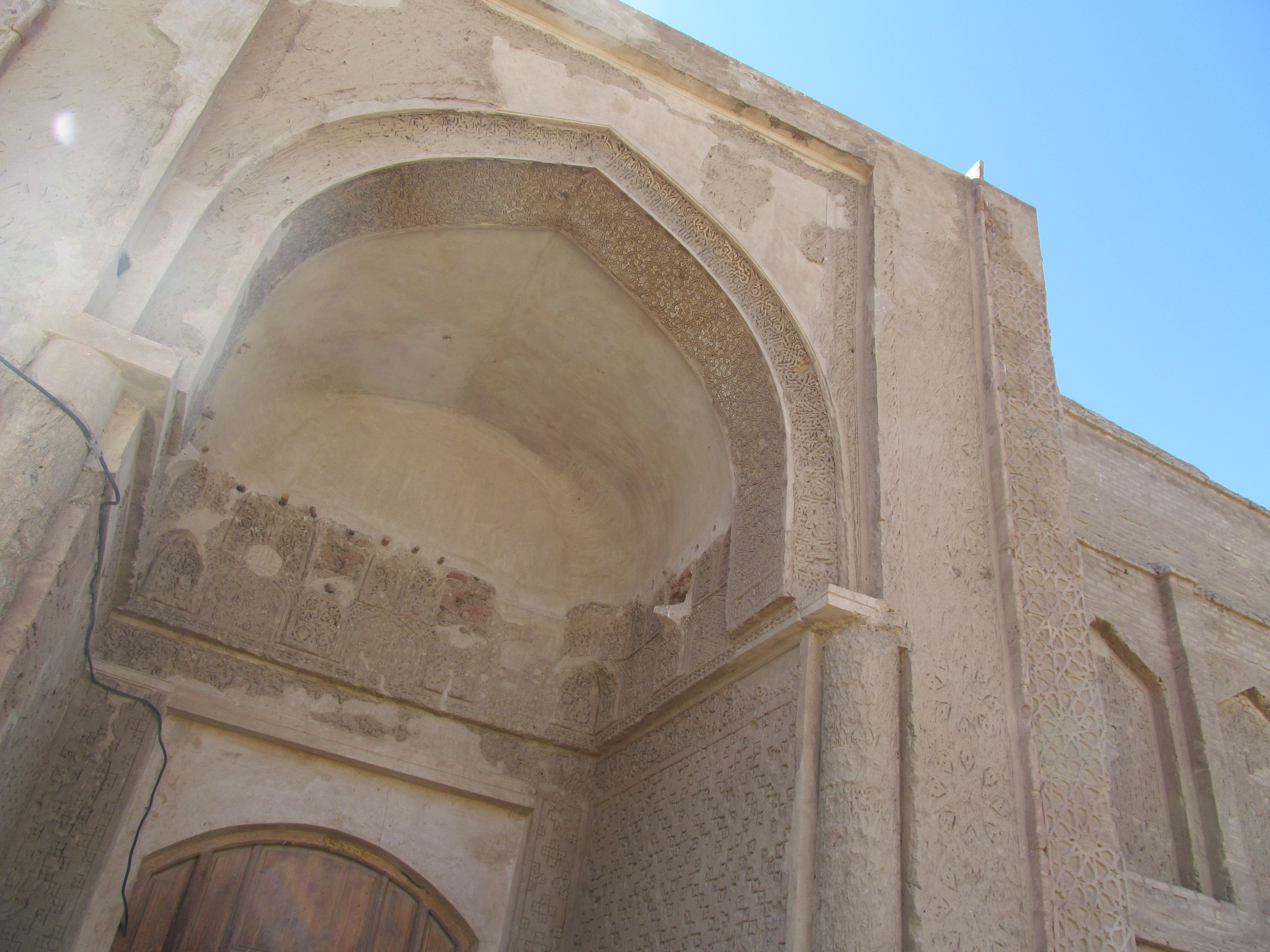

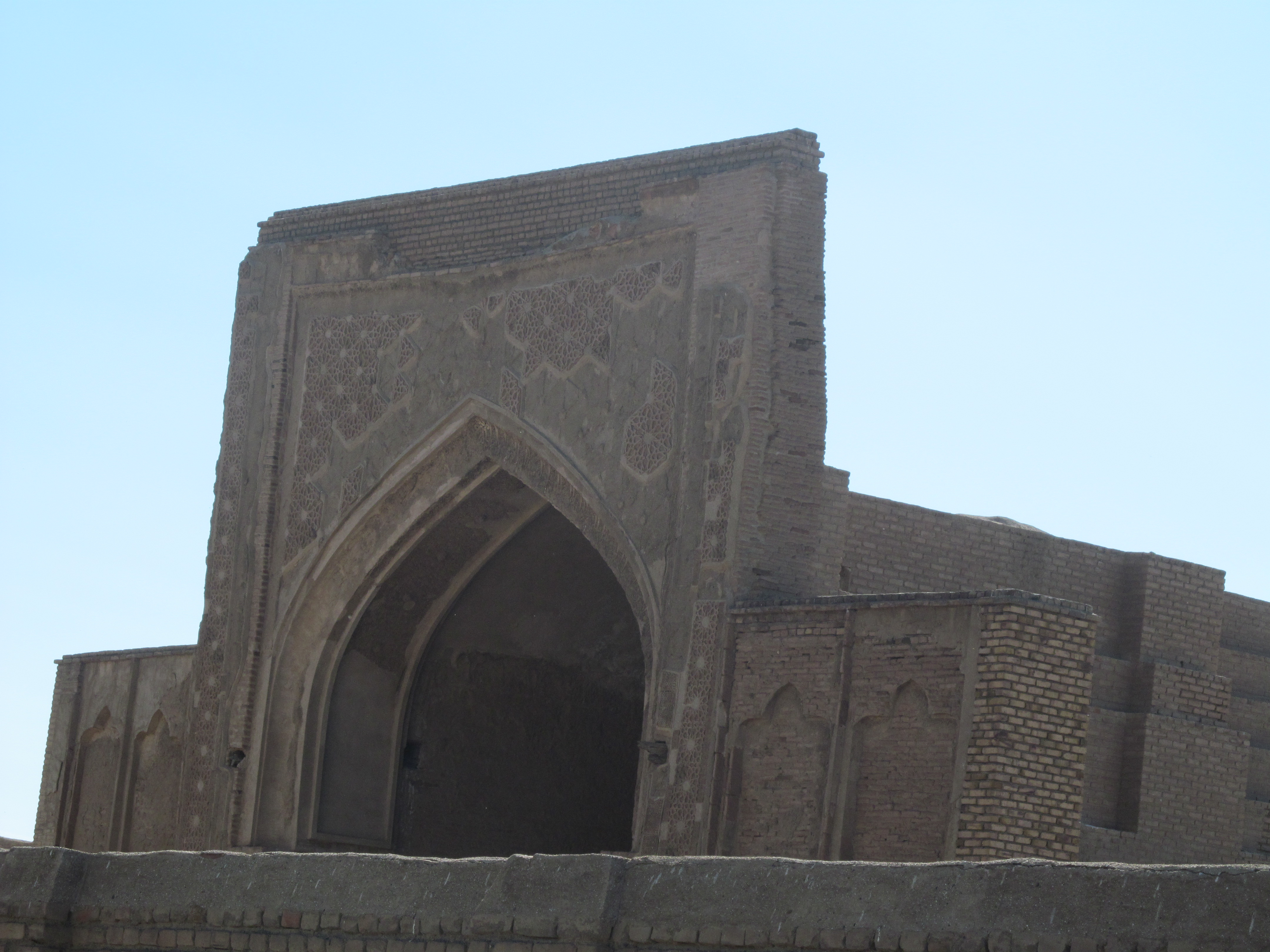

== See also ==
- Islam in Iran
- List of mosques in Iran
