= Kalateh-ye Sadat-e Bala, Semnan =

Village in Semnan province, Iran

Kalateh-ye Sadat-e Bala Persian: كلاته سادات بالا
- Village
- Location within Iran
- Coordinates: 36°27′26″N 56°42′03″E
- Country: Iran
- Province: Semnan
- County: Meyami
- District: Central
- Rural District: Farumad

Population (2016)
  - Total: 18
- Time zone: UTC+3:30 (IRST)

Kalateh-ye Sadat-e Bala (Persian: كلاته سادات بالا) (Note: Also romanized as Kalāteh-ye Sādāt-e Bālā; also known as Kalāteh-ye Sādāt-e ‘Olyā) is a village in Farumad Rural District of the Central District in Meyami County, Semnan province, Iran.

== Demographics ==
=== Population ===
At the time of the 2006 National Census, the village's population was 40 in 11 households, when it was in the former Meyami District of Shahrud County. The following census in 2011 counted 13 people in five households. The 2016 census measured the population of the village as 18 people in seven households, by which time the district had been separated from the county in the establishment of Meyami County. The rural district was transferred to the new Central District.
