= Gazeh, Semnan =

Gazeh گزه
- Village
- Location within Iran
- Coordinates: 36°40′41″N 55°52′33″E
- Country: Iran
- Province: Semnan
- County: Meyami
- Bakhsh: Central
- Rural District: Kalat-e Hay-ye Sharqi

Population (2006)
  - Total: 72
- Time zone: UTC+3:30 (IRST)
  - Summer (DST): UTC+4:30 (IRDT)

Gazeh (Persian: گزه; also known as Kalāteh-ye Gazī) is a village in Kalat-e Hay-ye Sharqi Rural District, in the Central District of Meyami County, Semnan Province, Iran. At the 2006 census, its population was 72, in 17 families.
