= Kalateh-ye Sadat-e Pain =

Village in Semnan province, Iran

Kalateh-ye Sadat-e Pain Persian: كلاته سادات پائين
- Village
- Location within Iran
- Coordinates: 36°27′16″N 56°42′20″E
- Country: Iran
- Province: Semnan
- County: Meyami
- District: Central
- Rural District: Farumad

Population (2016)
  - Total: 120
- Time zone: UTC+3:30 (IRST)

Kalateh-ye Sadat-e Pain (Persian: كلاته سادات پائين) (Note: Also romanized as Kalāteh-ye Sādāt-e Pā’īn; also known as Kalāteh-ye Sādāt and Kalāteh-ye Sādāt-e Soflá) is a village in Farumad Rural District of the Central District in Meyami County, Semnan province, Iran.

== Demographics ==
=== Population ===
At the time of the 2006 National Census, the village's population was 202 in 53 households, when it was in the former Meyami District of Shahrud County. The following census in 2011 counted 118 people in 41 households. The 2016 census measured the population of the village as 120 people in 44 households, by which time the district had been separated from the county in the establishment of Meyami County. The rural district was transferred to the new Central District.
