= Kalateh-ye Abdol, Semnan =

Village in Semnan province, Iran

Kalateh-ye Abdol Persian: كلاته عبدل
- Village
- Location within Iran
- Country: Iran
- Province: Semnan
- County: Meyami
- District: Central
- Rural District: Farumad

Population (2016)
  - Total: 49
- Time zone: UTC+3:30 (IRST)

Kalateh-ye Abdol (Persian: كلاته عبدل) (Note: Also romanized as Kalāteh-ye ‘Abdol) is a village in Farumad Rural District of the Central District in Meyami County, Semnan province, Iran.

== Demographics ==
=== Population ===
At the time of the 2006 National Census, the village's population was 68 in 15 households, when it was in the former Meyami District of Shahrud County. The following census in 2011 counted 60 people in 16 households. The 2016 census measured the population of the village as 49 people in 15 households, by which time the district had been separated from the county in the establishment of Meyami County. The rural district was transferred to the new Central District.
