= Nardin, Iran =

Village in Semnan province, Iran

Nardin Persian: نردين
- Village
- Location within Iran
- Coordinates: 37°02′10″N 55°47′07″E
- Country: Iran
- Province: Semnan
- County: Meyami
- District: Kalpush
- Rural District: Nardin

Population (2016)
  - Total: 3,758
- Time zone: UTC+3:30 (IRST)

Nardin (Persian: نردين) (Note: Also romanized as Nardeyn and Nardīn) is a village in, and the capital of, Nardin Rural District in Kalpush District of Meyami County, Semnan province, Iran.

== Demographics ==
=== Population ===
At the time of the 2006 National Census, the village's population was 2,739 in 714 households, when it was in the former Meyami District of Shahrud County. The following census in 2011 counted 3,420 people in 1,116 households. The 2016 census measured the population of the village as 3,758 people in 1,290 households, by which time the district had been separated from the county in the establishment of Meyami County. The rural district was transferred to the new Kalpush District. Nardin was the most populous village in its rural district.
