= Kalateh-ye Abdol =

Kalateh-ye Abdol (Persian: كلاته عبدل) may refer to:

- Kalateh-ye Abdol, Mashhad, Razavi Khorasan Province
- Kalateh-ye Abdol, Torqabeh and Shandiz, Razavi Khorasan Province
- Kalateh-ye Abdol, Semnan
