= Kuhan, Iran =

Kuhan or Kowhan (Persian: كوهان) in Iran may refer to:

- Kuhan, Isfahan
- Kowhan, Tiran and Karvan, Isfahan Province
- Shahrak-e Kowhan, Isfahan Province
- Kuhan, Kerman
- Kowhan, Semnan
