= Kowhan, Semnan =

Village in Semnan province, Iran

Kowhan Persian: كوهان
- Village
- Location within Iran
- Coordinates: 36°35′18″N 55°52′07″E
- Country: Iran
- Province: Semnan
- County: Meyami
- District: Central
- Rural District: Kalateh Hay-ye Sharqi

Population (2016)
  - Total: 834
- Time zone: UTC+3:30 (IRST)

Kowhan (Persian: كوهان) (Note: Also romanized as Kohān and Kowhān) is a village in Kalateh Hay-ye Sharqi Rural District of the Central District in Meyami County, Semnan province, Iran.

== Demographics ==
=== Population ===
At the time of the 2006 National Census, the village's population was 1,028 in 264 households, when it was in the former Meyami District of Shahrud County. The following census in 2011 counted 988 people in 297 households. The 2016 census measured the population of the village as 834 people in 280 households, by which time the district had been separated from the county in the establishment of Meyami County. The rural district was transferred to the new Central District.
