= Korang =

Korang or Koreng (Persian: كرنگ) may refer to:

- Korang, Rabor, Kerman Province, Iran
- Korang, Semnan, Iran
- Korang River, Pakistan
