= Korang, Semnan =

Village in Semnan province, Iran

Korang Persian: كرنگ
- Village
- Location within Iran
- Coordinates: 37°13′20″N 55°46′05″E
- Country: Iran
- Province: Semnan
- County: Meyami
- District: Kalpush
- Rural District: Rezvan

Population (2016)
  - Total: 1,094
- Time zone: UTC+3:30 (IRST)

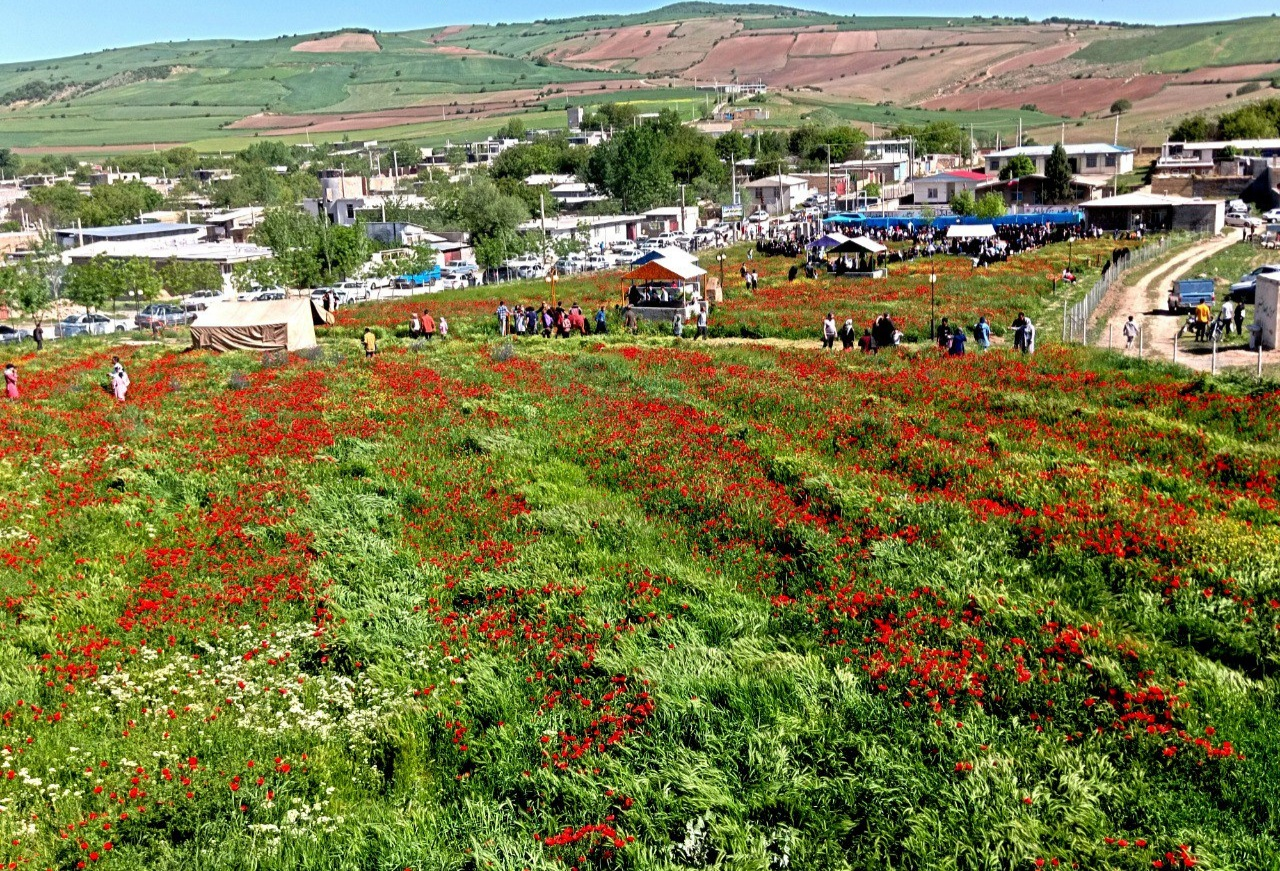

Korang (Persian: كرنگ) (Note: Also known as Gazanak) is a village in Rezvan Rural District (Note: Formerly Nardin Rural District) of Kalpush District in Meyami County, Semnan province, Iran.

== Demographics ==
=== Population ===
At the time of the 2006 National Census, the village's population was 1,019 in 257 households, when it was in the former Meyami District of Shahrud County. The following census in 2011 counted 1,079 people in 301 households. The 2016 census measured the population of the village as 1,094 people in 332 households, by which time the district had been separated from the county in the establishment of Meyami County. The rural district was transferred to the new Kalpush District.
