= Varposht =

Varposht or Var Posht (Persian: ورپشت) may refer to:

- Varposht, Nain
- Var Posht, Tiran and Karvan
- Var Posht Rural District, in Tiran and Karvan County
