= Kalateh-ye Sadat =

Kalateh-ye Sadat (Persian: كلاته سادات) may refer to:

- Kalateh-ye Sadat, North Khorasan
- Kalateh-ye Sadat, Razavi Khorasan
- Kalateh-ye Sadat, Semnan

== See also ==
- Kalateh-ye Sadat-e Bala (disambiguation)
