= Fazlabad, Isfahan =

Village in Isfahan province, Iran

Fazlabad Persian: فضل اباد
- Village
- Location within Iran
- Coordinates: 32°41′55″N 51°04′00″E
- Country: Iran
- Province: Isfahan
- County: Tiran and Karvan
- District: Central
- Rural District: Rezvaniyeh

Population (2016)
  - Total: 146
- Time zone: UTC+3:30 (IRST)

Fazlabad (Persian: فضل اباد) (Note: Also romanized as Faẕlābād) is a village in Rezvaniyeh Rural District of the Central District in Tiran and Karvan County, Isfahan province, Iran.

== Demographics ==
=== Population ===
At the time of the 2006 National Census, the village's population was 172 in 55 households. The following census in 2011 counted 162 people in 57 households. The 2016 census measured the population of the village as 146 people in 56 households.
