= Ibn Yamin =

Iranian poet

- ابن یمین
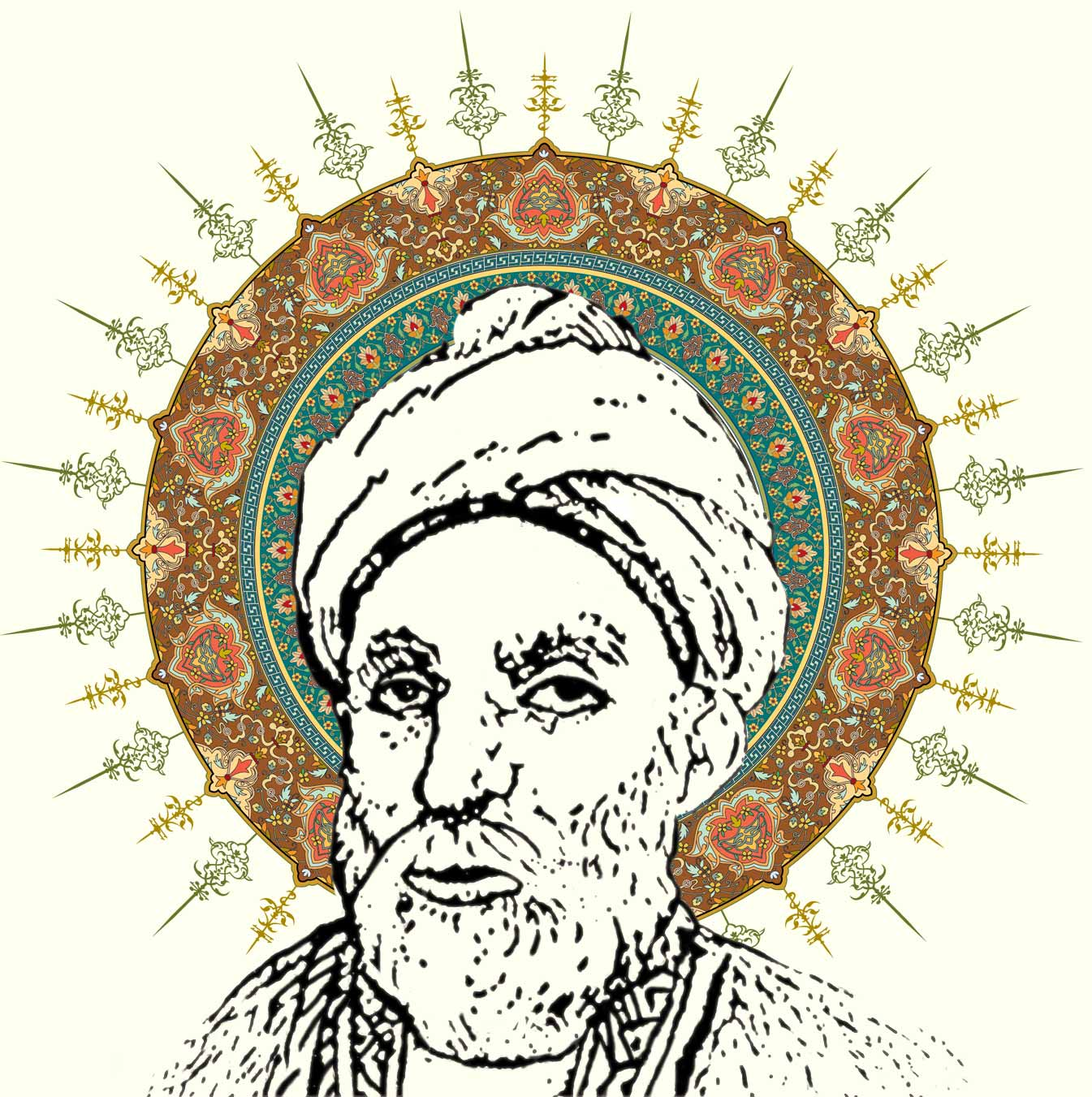
- Imaginary illustration of Ibn Yamin
- Born: 1286/87; Faryumad, Ilkhanate
- Died: 1368; Faryumad, Sarbadars
- Occupation: Poet

Ibn Yamin (also spelled Ibn-i Yamin; Persian: ابن یمین; 1286/87–1368) was a Persian poet who served under the Ilkhanate, Sarbadars, and Kartids.

== Biography ==
Ibn Yamin was born in 1286/87 in the town of Faryumad in western Khorasan. He belonged to a family of local landowners, a status they had seemingly held since ancient times. His father was the mustawfi (director of finance) of the governor of Khorasan, Khwaja Ala al-Din Muhammad. Ibn Yamin was educated in his hometown, which was then a center of culture. He had a typical education, being primarily related to medicine and literature. At a young age, Ibn Yamin became interested in poetry due to his father also being a poet. Following his father's death in 1323/24, Ibn Yamin was appointed court poet, financial official, and later mustawfi of Khwaja Ala al-Din Muhammad. He also eventually received the title of amir. Ibn Yamin disliked the court life, and fell into a conflict with his Khwaja Ala al-Din Muhammad, who was replaced by Tari Tagha'i between 1327–1329. The new governor was a tyrant who initially confiscated most of Ibn Yamin's property, and then later took the rest. In 1337, Ibn Yamin went to the city of Gurgan, where he served as the court poet of Togha Temür (died 1353), a claimant to the Ilkhanate throne. In 1341, Ibn Yamin entered into the service of the Sarbadars.

Ibn Yamin died at Faryumad in 1368.

A Shia Muslim, Ibn Yamin was one of the first poets to write about the Twelve Imams and the Battle of Karbala.

== Categorization of knowledge and ignorance ==
One of Ibn Yamin's most famous poems categorizes knowledge and ignorance into four states:

آن کس که بداند و بداند که بداند
اسب خرد از گنبد گردون بجهاند
آن کس که بداند و نداند که بداند
آگاه نمایید که بس خفته نماند
آن کس که نداند و بداند که نداند
لنگان خرک خویش به منزل برساند
آن کس که نداند و نداند که نداند
در جهل مرکب ابدالدهر بماند

- Known knowns: One who knows and knows that they know. Someone capable of transcending limits ("Their horse of wisdom will reach the skies").
- Unknown knowns: One who knows, but doesn’t know that they know. Someone asleep, requiring enlightenment.
- Known unknowns: One who doesn’t know, but knows that they don’t know. Someone capable of overcoming challenges ("Can manage to bring their limping mule home").
- Unknown unknowns: One who doesn’t know and doesn’t know that they don’t know. Someone eternally lost in the darkness of ignorance.

In the unknown unknowns category, ignorance is compounded by the lack of self-awareness about one's limitations.

== Sources ==
- Karimi-Hakkak, Ahmad (1997). "Ebn Yamīn, Amīr Faḵr-al-Dīn Maḥmūd". In Yarshater, Ehsan (ed.). Encyclopædia Iranica. Vol. VIII/1: Ebn ʿAyyāš–Economy V. London and New York: Routledge & Kegan Paul. pp. 59–60. ISBN 978-1-56859-050-9.
- Rypka, J. (1971). "Ibn-i Yamīn". In Lewis, B.; Ménage, V. L.; Pellat, Ch. & Schacht, J. (eds.). The Encyclopaedia of Islam, Second Edition. Volume III: H–Iram. Leiden: E. J. Brill. pp. 968–969. OCLC 495469525.
