= Kheyrabad, Tiran and Karvan =

Village in Isfahan province, Iran

Kheyrabad Persian: خيراباد
- Village
- Location within Iran
- Coordinates: 32°47′13″N 50°58′56″E
- Country: Iran
- Province: Isfahan
- County: Tiran and Karvan
- District: Central
- Rural District: Varposht

Population (2016)
  - Total: 919
- Time zone: UTC+3:30 (IRST)

Kheyrabad (Persian: خيراباد) (Note: Also romanized as Kheyrābād) is a village in Varposht Rural District (Note: Formerly Karvan-e Sofla Rural District) of the Central District in Tiran and Karvan County, Isfahan province, Iran.

== Demographics ==
=== Population ===
At the time of the 2006 National Census, the village's population was 864 in 241 households. The following census in 2011 counted 905 people in 277 households. The 2016 census measured the population of the village as 919 people in 289 households.
