= Farumad =

Village in Semnan province, Iran

Farumad Persian: فرومد
- Village
- Location within Iran
- Coordinates: 36°30′46″N 56°45′08″E
- Country: Iran
- Province: Semnan
- County: Meyami
- District: Central
- Rural District: Farumad

Population (2016)
  - Total: 1,529
- Time zone: UTC+3:30 (IRST)

Farumad (Persian: فرومد) (Note: Also romanized as Fārūmād and Forūmad; also known as Furmāk) is a village in, and the capital of, Farumad Rural District in the Central District of Meyami County, Semnan province, Iran.

== Demographics ==
=== Population ===
At the time of the 2006 National Census, the village's population was 1,959 in 616 households, when it was in the former Meyami District of Shahrud County. The following census in 2011 counted 1,479 people in 529 households. The 2016 census measured the population of the village as 1,529 people in 576 households, by which time the district had been separated from the county in the establishment of Meyami County. The rural district was transferred to the new Central District. Farumad was the most populous village in its rural district.
