= Hasanabad-e Abrizeh =

Village in Isfahan province, Iran

Hasanabad-e Abrizeh Persian: حسن ابادابريزه
- Village
- Location within Iran
- Coordinates: 32°42′03″N 51°02′30″E
- Country: Iran
- Province: Isfahan
- County: Tiran and Karvan
- District: Central
- Rural District: Rezvaniyeh

Population (2016)
  - Total: 1,337
- Time zone: UTC+3:30 (IRST)

Hasanabad-e Abrizeh (Persian: حسن ابادابريزه) (Note: Also romanized as Ḩasanābād-e Ābrīzeh; also known as Hasanābād, Ḩasanābād Porīzan, and Ḩoseynābād) is a village in Rezvaniyeh Rural District of the Central District in Tiran and Karvan County, Isfahan province, Iran.

== Demographics ==
=== Population ===
At the time of the 2006 National Census, the village's population was 1,229 in 353 households. The following census in 2011 counted 1,298 people in 424 households. The 2016 census measured the population of the village as 1,337 people in 436 households, the most populous in its rural district.
