= Kalateh-ye Sadat-e Bala =

Kalateh-ye Sadat-e Bala (Persian: كلاته سادات بالا) may refer to:

- Kalateh-ye Sadat-e Bala, Razavi Khorasan
- Kalateh-ye Sadat-e Bala, Semnan

== See also ==
- Kalateh-ye Sadat (disambiguation)
