= Rozvan =

Rozvan may refer to:

- Eugen Rozvan, Hungarian communist lawyer
- Rozvan, Iran (disambiguation), places in Iran
