= Shahrak-e Kowhan =

Shahrak-e Kowhan شهرك كوهان
- Village
- Location within Iran
- Coordinates: 32°41′16″N 51°10′36″E
- Country: Iran
- Province: Isfahan
- County: Tiran and Karvan
- Bakhsh: Central
- Rural District: Rezvaniyeh

Population (2006)
  - Total: 512
- Time zone: UTC+3:30 (IRST)

Shahrak-e Kowhan (Persian: شهرك كوهان, also Romanized as Shahrak-e Kowhān) is a village in Rezvaniyeh Rural District, in the Central District of Tiran and Karvan County, Isfahan Province, Iran.

== Population ==
At the 2006 census, its population was 512, in 137 families.
