= Qareh Tappeh, Isfahan =

Village in Isfahan province, Iran

Qareh Tappeh Persian: قره تپه
- Village
- Location within Iran
- Coordinates: 32°37′49″N 51°09′36″E
- Country: Iran
- Province: Isfahan
- County: Tiran and Karvan
- District: Central
- Rural District: Rezvaniyeh

Population (2016)
  - Total: 137
- Time zone: UTC+3:30 (IRST)

Qareh Tappeh (Persian: قره تپه) (Note: Also known as Qār Tappeh, Qarā Tappeh, and Qara Tepe) is a village in Rezvaniyeh Rural District of the Central District in Tiran and Karvan County, Isfahan province, Iran.

== Demographics ==
=== Population ===
At the time of the 2006 National Census, the village's population was 175 in 50 households. The following census in 2011 counted 129 people in 41 households. The 2016 census measured the population of the village as 137 people in 44 households.
