= Gazeh =

Gazeh or Gezeh or Gazzeh (Persian: گزه) may refer to:

- Gezeh, Hormozgan
- Gezeh, Isfahan
- Gazeh, Lorestan
- Gazeh, Semnan
