= Abpuneh =

Village in Isfahan province, Iran

Abpuneh Persian: اب پونه
- Village
- Location within Iran
- Coordinates: 32°40′20″N 50°56′41″E
- Country: Iran
- Province: Isfahan
- County: Tiran and Karvan
- District: Central
- Rural District: Rezvaniyeh

Population (2016)
  - Total: 785
- Time zone: UTC+3:30 (IRST)

Abpuneh (Persian: اب پونه) (Note: Also romanized as Ābpūneh; also known as Āb Pā’in and Āb-i-Pina) is a village in Rezvaniyeh Rural District of the Central District in Tiran and Karvan County, Isfahan province, Iran.

== Demographics ==
=== Population ===
At the time of the 2006 National Census, the village's population was 534 in 153 households. The following census in 2011 counted 563 people in 178 households. The 2016 census measured the population of the village as 785 people in 247 households.
