= Kharmanan =

Village in Isfahan province, Iran

Kharmanan Persian: خرمنان
- Village
- Location within Iran
- Coordinates: 32°47′04″N 50°59′33″E
- Country: Iran
- Province: Isfahan
- County: Tiran and Karvan
- District: Central
- Rural District: Varposht

Population (2016)
  - Total: 1,884
- Time zone: UTC+3:30 (IRST)

Kharmanan (Persian: خرمنان) (Note: Also romanized as Kharmanān) is a village in Varposht Rural District (Note: Formerly Karvan-e Sofla Rural District) of the Central District in Tiran and Karvan County, Isfahan province, Iran.

== Demographics ==
=== Population ===
At the time of the 2006 National Census, the village's population was 1,674 in 416 households. The following census in 2011 counted 1,742 people in 524 households. The 2016 census measured the population of the village as 1,884 people in 588 households.
