= Khamiran, Isfahan =

Village in Isfahan province, Iran

Khamiran Persian: خميران
- Village
- Location within Iran
- Coordinates: 32°46′52″N 51°01′15″E
- Country: Iran
- Province: Isfahan
- County: Tiran and Karvan
- District: Central
- Rural District: Varposht

Population (2016)
  - Total: 677
- Time zone: UTC+3:30 (IRST)

Khamiran (Persian: خميران) (Note: Also romanized as Khamīrān; also known as Khamīrūn and Khemeru) is a village in Varposht Rural District (Note: Formerly Karvan-e Sofla Rural District) of the Central District in Tiran and Karvan County, Isfahan province, Iran.

== Demographics ==
=== Population ===
At the time of the 2006 National Census, the village's population was 608 in 165 households. The following census in 2011 counted 635 people in 195 households. The 2016 census measured the population of the village as 677 people in 207 households.
