= Human, Iran =

Village in Isfahan province, Iran

Human Persian: هومان
- Village
- Location within Iran
- Coordinates: 32°47′25″N 50°59′47″E
- Country: Iran
- Province: Isfahan
- County: Tiran and Karvan
- District: Central
- Rural District: Varposht

Population (2016)
  - Total: 1,536
- Time zone: UTC+3:30 (IRST)

Human (Persian: هومان) (Note: Also romanized as Hūmān; also known as Mūhān) is a village in Varposht Rural District (Note: Formerly Karvan-e Sofla Rural District) of the Central District in Tiran and Karvan County, Isfahan province, Iran.

== Demographics ==
=== Population ===
At the time of the 2006 National Census, the village's population was 1,346 in 361 households. The following census in 2011 counted 1,456 people in 429 households. The 2016 census measured the population of the village as 1,536 people in 483 households.
