= Kowhan, Tiran and Karvan =

Kowhan كوهان
- Village
- Location within Iran
- Coordinates: 32°40′49″N 51°09′52″E
- Country: Iran
- Province: Isfahan
- County: Tiran and Karvan
- Bakhsh: Central
- Rural District: Rezvaniyeh

Population (2006)
  - Total: 248
- Time zone: UTC+3:30 (IRST)
  - Summer (DST): UTC+4:30 (IRDT)

Kowhan (Persian: كوهان, also Romanized as Kowhān and Kūhān; also known as Golshanābād, Gūhān, and Kahān) is a village that is located in the Rezvaniyeh Rural District, in the Central District of Tiran and Karvan County, Isfahan Province, Iran. At the 2006 census, its population was 248, in 77 families.
