= Tonderan =

Village in Isfahan province, Iran

Tonderan Persian: تندران
- Village
- Location within Iran
- Coordinates: 32°46′53″N 51°02′43″E
- Country: Iran
- Province: Isfahan
- County: Tiran and Karvan
- District: Central
- Rural District: Varposht

Population (2016)
  - Total: 1,208
- Time zone: UTC+3:30 (IRST)

Tonderan (Persian: تندران) (Note: Also romanized as Tanderān and Tonderān; also known as Tanderūn and Tundarūn) is a village in Varposht Rural District (Note: Formerly Karvan-e Sofla Rural District) of the Central District in Tiran and Karvan County, Isfahan province, Iran.

== Demographics ==
=== Population ===
At the time of the 2006 National Census, the village's population was 1,109 in 290 households. The following census in 2011 counted 1,170 people in 380 households. The 2016 census measured the population of the village as 1,208 people in 411 households.
