= Azizabad, Isfahan =

Village in Isfahan province, Iran

Azizabad Persian: عزيزاباد
- Village
- Location within Iran
- Coordinates: 32°39′21″N 51°09′10″E
- Country: Iran
- Province: Isfahan
- County: Tiran and Karvan
- District: Central
- Rural District: Rezvaniyeh

Population (2016)
  - Total: 498
- Time zone: UTC+3:30 (IRST)

Azizabad (Persian: عزيزاباد) (Note: Also romanized as ‘Azīzābād) is a village in Rezvaniyeh Rural District of the Central District in Tiran and Karvan County, Isfahan province, Iran.

== Demographics ==
=== Population ===
At the time of the 2006 National Census, the village's population was 542 in 168 households. The following census in 2011 counted 521 people in 178 households. The 2016 census measured the population of the village as 498 people in 169 households.

== The Pigeon Towers of Azizabad ==
The village is also renowned for its historical pigeon towers, which served as both guano factories and ornate architectural structures. These towers, constructed during the 17th century, were designed to house as many as 14,000 pigeons each, with their droppings being collected for use as fertilizer. Pigeon towers have existed in the region for at least 800 years, as noted by ancient travelers such as Ibn Battuta. Tamerlane, the famous ruler, ordered the construction of similar towers in his capital, Bukhara, upon learning about their functions. However, during the invasion of Afghans, many pigeon towers were destroyed, potentially repurposed as shelters.
