= Kuhan =

Kuhan may refer to:

- Alyaksandr Kuhan (b. 1991), Belarusian footballer
- Kuhan, Iran (disambiguation), places in Iran
