= Qaleh-ye Musa Khan =

Village in Isfahan province, Iran

Qaleh-ye Musa Khan Persian: قلعه موسي خان
- Village
- Location within Iran
- Coordinates: 32°36′37″N 50°58′04″E
- Country: Iran
- Province: Isfahan
- County: Tiran and Karvan
- District: Central
- Rural District: Rezvaniyeh

Population (2016)
  - Total: 101
- Time zone: UTC+3:30 (IRST)

Qaleh-ye Musa Khan (Persian: قلعه موسي خان) (Note: Also romanized as Qal‘eh Mūsá Khān and Qal‘eh-ye Mūsá Khān; also known as Ghal‘eh Moosa Khan) is a village in Rezvaniyeh Rural District of the Central District in Tiran and Karvan County, Isfahan province, Iran.

== Demographics ==
=== Population ===
At the time of the 2006 National Census, the village's population was 119 in 41 households. The following census in 2011 counted 124 people in 41 households. The 2016 census measured the population of the village as 101 people in 33 households.
