= Jaja, Tiran and Karvan =

Village in Isfahan province, Iran

Jaja Persian: جاجا
- Village
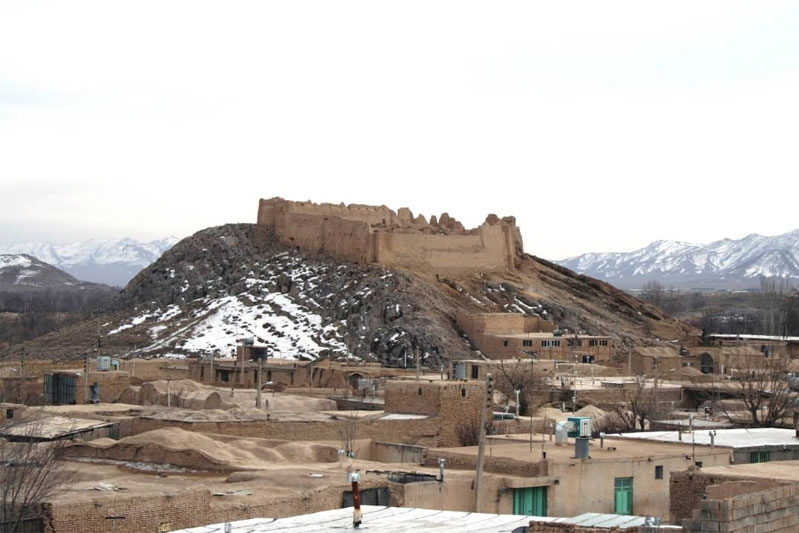
- The village of Jaja

- Location within Iran
- Coordinates: 32°44′03″N 51°05′30″E
- Country: Iran
- Province: Isfahan
- County: Tiran and Karvan
- District: Central
- Rural District: Rezvaniyeh

Population (2016)
  - Total: 220
- Time zone: UTC+3:30 (IRST)

Jaja (Persian: جاجا) (Note: Also romanized as Jā Jā and Jājā; also known as Chah Jā, Chāhjah, Chāhjeh, Chājeh, and Shāhjūn) is a village in Rezvaniyeh Rural District of the Central District in Tiran and Karvan County, Isfahan province, Iran.

== Demographics ==
=== Population ===
At the time of the 2006 National Census, the village's population was 289 in 88 households. The following census in 2011 counted 235 people in 77 households. The 2016 census measured the population of the village as 220 people in 75 households.
