= Jafarabad, Tiran and Karvan =

Village in Isfahan province, Iran

Jafarabad Persian: جعفراباد
- Village
- Location within Iran
- Coordinates: 32°47′38″N 51°00′35″E
- Country: Iran
- Province: Isfahan
- County: Tiran and Karvan
- District: Central
- Rural District: Varposht

Population (2016)
  - Total: 758
- Time zone: UTC+3:30 (IRST)

Jafarabad (Persian: جعفراباد) (Note: Also romanized as Ja‘farābād; also known as Kheyrābād) is a village in Varposht Rural District (Note: Formerly Karvan-e Sofla Rural District) of the Central District in Tiran and Karvan County, Isfahan province, Iran.

== Demographics ==
=== Population ===
At the time of the 2006 National Census, the village's population was 746 in 201 households. The following census in 2011 counted 801 people in 254 households. The 2016 census measured the population of the village as 758 people in 255 households.
