= Juju, Iran =

Village in Isfahan province, Iran

Juju Persian: جوجو
- Village
- Location within Iran
- Coordinates: 32°43′37″N 51°00′06″E
- Country: Iran
- Province: Isfahan
- County: Tiran and Karvan
- District: Central
- Rural District: Varposht

Population (2016)
  - Total: 0
- Time zone: UTC+3:30 (IRST)

Juju (Persian: جوجو) (Note: Also romanized as Jūjū; also known as Mazra‘eh Jūjū) is a village in Varposht Rural District (Note: Formerly Karvan-e Sofla Rural District) of the Central District in Tiran and Karvan County, Isfahan province, Iran.

== Demographics ==
=== Population ===
At the time of the 2006 National Census, the village's population was 41 in 11 households. The village did not appear in the following census of 2011. The 2016 census measured the population of the village as zero.
