= Maimi (disambiguation) =

Maimi may refer to:

== Places and peoples ==
- Maimi or Mayaimi, a native American people
- Meyami, a city in Iran

== People ==
- Maimi Yajima (b. 1992), a Japanese singer (Cute)
