= Varposht, Tiran and Karvan =

Village in Isfahan province, Iran

Varposht Persian: ورپشت
- Village
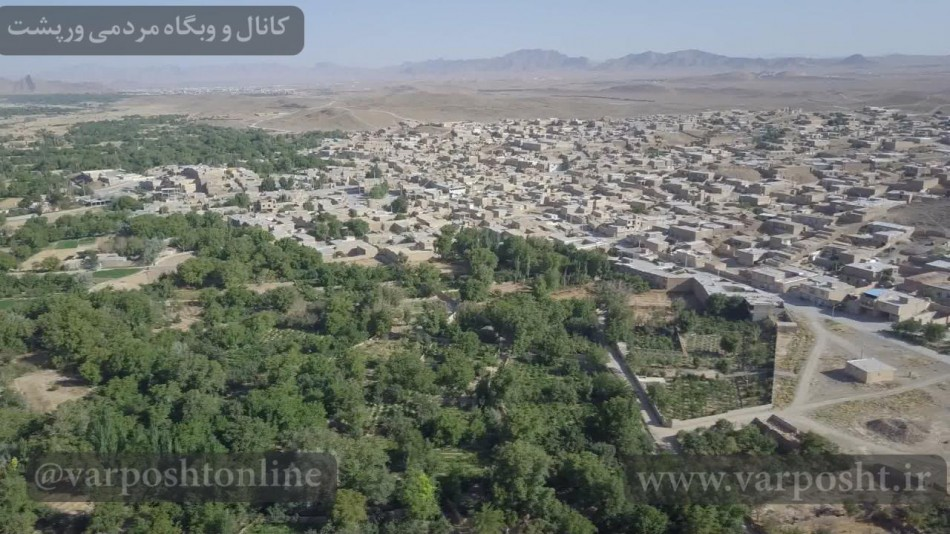
- The village of Varposht

- Location within Iran
- Coordinates: 32°44′38″N 51°04′00″E
- Country: Iran
- Province: Isfahan
- County: Tiran and Karvan
- District: Central
- Rural District: Varposht

Population (2016)
  - Total: 2,759
- Time zone: UTC+3:30 (IRST)

Varposht (Persian: ورپشت) (Note: Also romanized as Var Posht; also known as Varpusht) is a village in, and the capital of, Varposht Rural District (Note: Formerly Karvan-e Sofla Rural District) in the Central District of Tiran and Karvan County, Isfahan province, Iran.

== Demographics ==
=== Population ===
At the time of the 2006 National Census, the village's population was 2,908 in 855 households. The following census in 2011 counted 2,990 people in 971 households. The 2016 census measured the population of the village as 2,759 people in 945 households, the most populous in its rural district.
