= Meyami Rural District =

Meyami Rural District (Persian: دهستان ميامي) may refer to:

- Meyami Rural District (Razavi Khorasan Province)
- Meyami Rural District (Meyami County), Semnan province
