= Rezvan, Semnan =

City in Semnan province, Iran

Rezvan Persian: رضوان
- City
- Location within Iran
- Coordinates: 37°11′07″N 55°47′51″E
- Country: Iran
- Province: Semnan
- County: Meyami
- District: Kalpush
- Established as a city: 2020

Population (2016)
  - Total: 1,591
- Time zone: UTC+3:30 (IRST)

Rezvan (Persian: رضوان) (Note: Also romanized as Reẕvān; also known as Sū Dāghelān (سوداغلن), Sūdāghlān, and Sūdoqlān) is a city in, and the capital of, Kalpush District in Meyami County, Semnan province, Iran. It also serves as the administrative center for Rezvan Rural District. (Note: Formerly Nardin Rural District)

== Demographics ==
=== Population ===
At the time of the 2006 National Census, the village's population was 1,067 in 276 households, when it was a village in Rezvan Rural District of the former Meyami District in Shahrud County. The following census in 2011 counted 1,555 people in 389 households. The 2016 census measured the population of the village as 1,591 people in 452 households, by which time the district had been separated from the county in the establishment of Meyami County. The rural district was transferred to the new Kalpush District.

The village of Rezvan was converted to a city in 2020.
