= Tiran, Iran =

City in Isfahan province, Iran

Tiran Persian: تیران
- City

- Location within Iran
- Coordinates: 32°42′14″N 51°09′09″E
- Country: Iran
- Province: Isfahan
- County: Tiran and Karvan
- District: Central

Population (2016)
  - Total: 21,703
- Time zone: UTC+3:30 (IRST)

Tiran (Persian: تیران) (Note: Also romanized as Tīrān; also known as Tehrān, Tihrān, and Tirūn) is a city in the Central District of Tiran and Karvan County, Isfahan province, Iran, serving as capital of both the county and the district.

== Demographics ==
=== Population ===
At the time of the 2006 National Census, the city's population was 15,673 in 4,431 households. The following census in 2011 counted 19,421 people in 5,871 households. The 2016 census measured the population of the city as 21,703 people in 6,880 households.
