= Farumad Rural District =

Rural district in Semnan province, Iran

Farumad Rural District Persian: دهستان فرومد
- Rural District
- Location within Iran
- Coordinates: 36°25′N 56°39′E
- Country: Iran
- Province: Semnan
- County: Meyami
- District: Central
- Established: 1987
- Capital: Farumad

Population (2016)
  - Total: 2,614
- Time zone: UTC+3:30 (IRST)

Farumad Rural District (Persian: دهستان فرومد) is in the Central District of Meyami County, Semnan province, Iran. Its capital is the village of Farumad.

== Demographics ==
=== Population ===
At the time of the 2006 National Census, the rural district's population (as a part of the former Meyami District in Shahrud County) was 3,472 in 1,037 households. There were 2,575 inhabitants in 891 households at the following census of 2011. The 2016 census measured the population of the rural district as 2,614 in 934 households, by which time the district had been separated from the county in the establishment of Meyami County. The rural district was transferred to the new Central District. The most populous of its 49 villages was Farumad, with 1,529 people.

=== Other villages in the rural district ===
- Estarband
- Firuzabad-e Bala
- Firuzabad-e Pain
- Kalateh-ye Abdol
- Kalateh-ye Mir Alam
- Kalateh-ye Molla
- Kalateh-ye Sadat-e Bala
- Kalateh-ye Sadat-e Pain
- Masihabad
- Mirhajj
