= Rezvan Rural District =

Rezvan Rural District (Persian: دهستان رضوان) may refer to various places in Iran:

- Rezvan Rural District (Jiroft County), Kerman province
- Rezvan Rural District (Rafsanjan County), Kerman province
- Rezvan Rural District (Meyami County), Semnan province
