= Rezvanshahr =

Rezvanshahr (Persian: رضوانشهر) may refer to:

- Rezvanshahr, Gilan, a city in Gilan Province, Iran
- Rezvanshahr, Isfahan, a city in Isfahan Province, Iran
- Rezvanshahr, Yazd, in Yazd Province, Iran
- Rezvanshahr County, an administrative subdivision in Gīlan Province, Iran
