= Kalateh-ye Sadat, North Khorasan =

Kalateh-ye Sadat كلاته سادات
- Village
- Location within Iran
- Coordinates: 37°04′55″N 57°24′20″E
- Country: Iran
- Province: North Khorasan
- County: Esfarayen
- Bakhsh: Central
- Rural District: Ruin

Population (2006)
  - Total: 101
- Time zone: UTC+3:30 (IRST)
  - Summer (DST): UTC+4:30 (IRDT)

Kalateh-ye Sadat (Persian: كلاته سادات, also Romanized as Kalāteh-ye Sādāt; also known as Kalāteh-ye Sādātābād) is a village in Ruin Rural District, in the Central District of Esfarayen County, North Khorasan Province, Iran. At the 2006 census, its population was 101, in 21 families.
