= Rezvanshahr, Isfahan =

City in Isfahan province, Iran

Rezvanshahr Persian: رضوانشهر
- City
- Location within Iran
- Coordinates: 32°42′15″N 51°06′15″E
- Country: Iran
- Province: Isfahan
- County: Tiran and Karvan
- District: Central
- Established as a city: 2002

Population (2016)
  - Total: 3,606
- Time zone: UTC+3:30 (IRST)

Rezvanshahr (Persian: رضوانشهر) (Note: Also romanized as Reẕvānshahr, formerly the village of Shahrak-e Rezvan) is a city in the Central District of Tiran and Karvan County, Isfahan province, Iran, serving as the administrative center for Rezvaniyeh Rural District.

== History ==
The village of Shahrak-e Rezvan was converted to a city and renamed Rezvanshahr in 2002.

== Demographics ==
=== Population ===
At the time of the 2006 National Census, the city's population was 3,642 in 1,132 households. The following census in 2011 counted 3,508 people in 1,092 households. The 2016 census measured the population of the city as 3,606 people in 1,213 households.
