= Nardin (surname) =

Nardin is a surname of French and Italian origin. Notable people with this surname include:

- Aldo Nardin (1947–2020), Italian footballer
- Alberto Nardin (born 1990), Italian racing cyclist
- Andrea Nardin (born 1972), Italian politician
- Dino Nardin (1932–2010), Italian rower
- Nadia De Nardin (born 1975), Italian ice hockey player
- Stelio Nardin (1939–2014), Italian football player
- Terry Nardin (born 1942), political theorist at the National University of Singapore
