= Korang, Rabor =

Korang كرنگ
- Village
- Location within Iran
- Coordinates: 29°01′47″N 57°07′55″E
- Country: Iran
- Province: Kerman
- County: Rabor
- Bakhsh: Hanza
- Rural District: Javaran

Population (2006)
  - Total: 9
- Time zone: UTC+3:30 (IRST)
  - Summer (DST): UTC+4:30 (IRDT)

Korang (Persian: كرنگ, also Romanized as Koreng) is a village in Javaran Rural District, Hanza District, Rabor County, Kerman Province, Iran. At the 2006 census, its population was 9, in 4 families.
