= Rezvan, Khuzestan =

Rezvan رضوان
- Village
- Location within Iran
- Coordinates: 30°51′12″N 49°27′30″E
- Country: Iran
- Province: Khuzestan
- County: Ramshir
- Bakhsh: Central
- Rural District: Abdoliyeh-ye Gharbi

Population (2006)
  - Total: 79
- Time zone: UTC+3:30 (IRST)
  - Summer (DST): UTC+4:30 (IRDT)

Rezvan (Persian: رضوان, also Romanized as Rezvān, Reẕvān, Razwan, and Roẕvān) is a village in Abdoliyeh-ye Gharbi Rural District, in the Central District of Ramshir County, Khuzestan Province, Iran. At the 2006 census, its population was 79, in 13 families.
