= Rezvan, Mashhad =

Rezvan رضوان
- Village
- Location within Iran
- Coordinates: 36°33′11″N 59°38′47″E
- Country: Iran
- Province: Razavi Khorasan
- County: Mashhad
- Bakhsh: Central
- Rural District: Tabadkan

Population (2006)
  - Total: 856
- Time zone: UTC+3:30 (IRST)
  - Summer (DST): UTC+4:30 (IRDT)

Rezvan (Persian: رضوان, also Romanized as Reẕvān and Rezvān) is a village in Tabadkan Rural District, in the Central District of Mashhad County, Razavi Khorasan Province, Iran. At the 2006 census, its population was 856, in 243 families.
