= Rezvan Rural District (Meyami County) =

Rural district in Semnan province, Iran

Rezvan Rural District Persian: دهستان رضوان
- Rural District
- Location within Iran
- Coordinates: 37°12′N 55°46′E
- Country: Iran
- Province: Semnan
- County: Meyami
- District: Kalpush
- Established: 1987
- Capital: Rezvan

Population (2016)
  - Total: 12,306
- Time zone: UTC+3:30 (IRST)

Rezvan Rural District (Persian: دهستان رضوان) (Note: Formerly Nardin Rural District (دهستان نردين)) is in Kalpush District of Meyami County, Semnan province, Iran. It is administered from the city of Rezvan.

== Demographics ==
=== Population ===
At the time of the 2006 National Census, the rural district's population (as a part of the former Meyami District in Shahrud County) was 10,837 in 2,500 households. There were 12,296 inhabitants in 3,337 households at the following census of 2011. The 2016 census measured the population of the rural district as 12,306 in 3,729 households, by which time the district had been separated from the county in the establishment of Meyami County. The rural district was transferred to the new Kalpush District. The most populous of its 23 villages was Hoseynabad-e Kalpush, with 3,514 people.

=== Other villages in the rural district ===
- Baghcheh
- Dasht-e Shad
- Kamardar
- Korang
- Nam-e Nik
- Qowsheh Degarman
