= Kalateh Hay-ye Sharqi Rural District =

Rural district in Semnan province, Iran

Kalateh Hay-ye Sharqi Rural District Persian: دهستان كلاته هائ شرقي
- Rural District
- Location within Iran
- Coordinates: 36°41′N 55°59′E
- Country: Iran
- Province: Semnan
- County: Meyami
- District: Central
- Established: 1987
- Capital: Bakran

Population (2016)
  - Total: 5,503
- Time zone: UTC+3:30 (IRST)

Kalateh Hay-ye Sharqi Rural District (Persian: دهستان كلاته هائ شرقي) is in the Central District of Meyami County, Semnan province, Iran. Its capital is the village of Bakran.

== Demographics ==
=== Population ===
At the time of the 2006 National Census, the rural district's population (as a part of the former Meyami District in Shahrud County) was 6,420 in 1,682 households. There were 5,837 inhabitants in 1,816 households at the following census of 2011. The 2016 census measured the population of the rural district as 5,503 in 1,848 households, by which time the district had been separated from the county in the establishment of Meyami County. The rural district was transferred to the new Central District. The most populous of its 55 villages was Bakran, with 1,266 people.

=== Other villages in the rural district ===
- Chah-e Shirin
- Hoseynabad
- Hunestan
- Kordabad
- Kowhan
- Reyabad
