= Rezvan, Gilan =

Rezvan رزوان
- Village
- Location within Iran
- Coordinates: 37°36′51″N 48°47′08″E
- Country: Iran
- Province: Gilan
- County: Talesh
- Bakhsh: Asalem
- Rural District: Kharajgil

Population (2016)
  - Total: 52
- Time zone: UTC+3:30 (IRST)

Rezvan (Persian: رزوان, also Romanized as Rezvān and Reẕvān) is a village in Kharajgil Rural District, Asalem District, Talesh County, Gilan Province, Iran. At the 2016 census, its population was 52, in 18 families. Up from 37 people in 2006.
