= Nardin Rural District =

Rural district in Semnan province, Iran

Nardin Rural District Persian: دهستان نردين
- Rural District
- Location within Iran
- Coordinates: 37°01′N 55°47′E
- Country: Iran
- Province: Semnan
- County: Meyami
- District: Kalpush
- Established: 1991
- Capital: Nardin

Population (2016)
  - Total: 6,912
- Time zone: UTC+3:30 (IRST)

Nardin Rural District (Persian: دهستان نردين) is in Kalpush District of Meyami County, Semnan province, Iran. Its capital is the village of Nardin.

== Demographics ==
=== Population ===
At the time of the 2006 National Census, the rural district's population (as a part of the former Meyami District in Shahrud County) was 5,514 in 1,457 households. There were 6,630 inhabitants in 2,093 households at the following census of 2011. The 2016 census measured the population of the rural district as 6,912 in 2,306 households, by which time the district had been separated from the county in the establishment of Meyami County. The rural district was transferred to the new Kalpush District. The most populous of its 36 villages was Nardin, with 3,758 people.

=== Other villages in the rural district ===
- Golestan
- Haq ol Khvajeh
- Talvin
