= Varposht Rural District =

Rural district in Isfahan province, Iran

Varposht Rural District Persian: دهستان ور پشت
- Rural District
- Location within Iran
- Coordinates: 32°47′N 51°02′E
- Country: Iran
- Province: Isfahan
- County: Tiran and Karvan
- District: Central
- Established: 1987
- Capital: Varposht

Population (2016)
  - Total: 9,743
- Time zone: UTC+3:30 (IRST)

Varposht Rural District (Persian: دهستان ور پشت) (Note: Formerly Karvan-e Sofla Rural District (دهستان ور كرون سفلي)) is in the Central District of Tiran and Karvan County, Isfahan province, Iran. Its capital is the village of Varposht.

== Demographics ==
=== Population ===
At the time of the 2006 National Census, the rural district's population was 9,299 in 2,541 households. There were 9,701 inhabitants in 3,031 households at the following census of 2011. The 2016 census measured the population of the rural district as 9,743 in 3,179 households. The most populous of its 16 villages was Varposht, with 2,759 people.

=== Other villages in the rural district ===
- Human
- Jafarabad
- Juju
- Khamiran
- Kharmanan
- Kheyrabad
- Tonderan
