= Kalateh-ye Abdol, Mashhad =

Kalateh-ye Abdol كلاته عبدل
- Village
- Location within Iran
- Coordinates: 35°54′28″N 60°27′43″E
- Country: Iran
- Province: Razavi Khorasan
- County: Mashhad
- Bakhsh: Razaviyeh
- Rural District: Pain Velayat

Population (2006)
  - Total: 118
- Time zone: UTC+3:30 (IRST)
  - Summer (DST): UTC+4:30 (IRDT)

Kalateh-ye Abdol (Persian: كلاته عبدل, also Romanized as Kalāteh-ye ‘Abdol) is a village in Pain Velayat Rural District, Razaviyeh District, Mashhad County, Razavi Khorasan Province, Iran. At the 2006 census, its population was 118, in 27 families.
