= Meyami Rural District (Meyami County) =

Rural district in Semnan province, Iran

Meyami Rural District Persian: دهستان ميامي
- Rural District
- Location within Iran
- Coordinates: 36°25′N 55°53′E
- Country: Iran
- Province: Semnan
- County: Meyami
- District: Central
- Established: 1987
- Capital: Ebrahimabad-e Olya

Population (2016)
  - Total: 6,817
- Time zone: UTC+3:30 (IRST)

Meyami Rural District (Persian: دهستان ميامي) is in the Central District of Meyami County, Semnan province, Iran. Its capital is the village of Ebrahimabad-e Olya. The rural district was previously administered from the city of Meyami.

== Demographics ==
=== Population ===
At the time of the 2006 National Census, the rural district's population (as a part of the former Meyami District in Shahrud County) was 6,524 in 1,791 households. There were 5,358 inhabitants in 1,623 households at the following census of 2011. The 2016 census measured the population of the rural district as 6,817 in 2,233 households, by which time the district had been separated from the county in the establishment of Meyami County. The rural district was transferred to the new Central District. The most populous of its 118 villages was Mohammadabad, with 1,397 people.

=== Other villages in the rural district ===
- Abbasabad
- Armian
- Ebrahimabad-e Sofla
- Hemmatabad
- Judaneh
- Kalateh-ye Asad
- Qods
