= Rezvaniyeh Rural District =

Rural district in Isfahan province, Iran

Rezvaniyeh Rural District Persian: دهستان رضوانيه
- Rural District
- Location within Iran
- Coordinates: 32°41′N 51°03′E
- Country: Iran
- Province: Isfahan
- County: Tiran and Karvan
- District: Central
- Established: 1987
- Capital: Rezvanshahr

Population (2016)
  - Total: 3,837
- Time zone: UTC+3:30 (IRST)

Rezvaniyeh Rural District (Persian: دهستان رضوانيه) is in the Central District of Tiran and Karvan County, Isfahan province, Iran. It is administered from the city of Rezvanshahr. (Note: Formerly the village of Shahrak-e Rezvan)

== Demographics ==
=== Population ===
At the time of the 2006 National Census, the rural district's population was 4,303 in 1,303 households. There were 3,769 inhabitants in 1,292 households at the following census of 2011. The 2016 census measured the population of the rural district as 3,837 in 1,284 households. The most populous of its 57 villages was Hasanabad-e Abrizeh, with 1,337 people.

=== Other villages in the rural district ===
- Abpuneh
- Azizabad
- Fazlabad
- Jaja
- Qaleh-ye Musa Khan
- Qareh Tappeh
