= Meyami =

City in Semnan province, Iran

Meyami Persian: میامی
- City
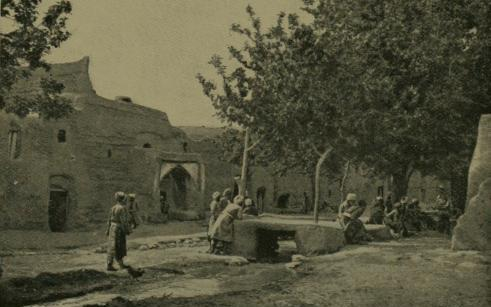
- View of Meyami, 1906

- Location within Iran
- Coordinates: 36°24′33″N 55°39′10″E
- Country: Iran
- Province: Semnan
- County: Meyami
- District: Meyami

Population (2016)
  - Total: 4,566
- Time zone: UTC+3:30 (IRST)

Meyami (Persian: میامی) (Note: Also romanized as Meyāmey, Meyāmī, and Miami; also known as Maiāmai and Mayāmey) is a city in the Central District of Meyami County, Semnan province, Iran, serving as capital of both the county and the district. It was the administrative center for Meyami Rural District until its capital was transferred to the village of Ebrahimabad-e Olya.

== Demographics ==
=== Population ===
At the time of the 2006 National Census, the city's population was 4,057 in 1,116 households, when it was capital of the former Meyami District in Shahrud County. The following census in 2011 counted 4,562 people in 1,340 households. The 2016 census measured the population of the city as 4,566 people in 1,431 households, by which time the district had been separated from the county in the establishment of Meyami County. The city was transferred to the new Central District as the county's capital.

== Landmarks ==
Meyami Caravanserai is an almost intact Safavid era structure located in the city center. It is a UNESCO World Heritage Site as a Persian Caravanserai. This building is in the form of a central courtyard, with a base of 5,250 square meters and is of the type of four iwans made of bricks. The entrance is in the shape of an iwan and has two floors, is located on the north side of the caravanserai. Carved stone inscriptions have been installed in the entrance door, the date of construction and its founder are written on it, and it is unique in this respect.

Meyami Caravanserai was listed as a national monument of Iran in 1986 and is currently the location of the Anthropological Museum of Meyami.
