= Kalpush District =

District in Semnan province, Iran

Kalpush District Persian: بخش کالپوش
- District
- Location within Iran
- Coordinates: 37°05′N 55°47′E
- Country: Iran
- Province: Semnan
- County: Meyami
- Established: 2011
- Capital: Rezvan

Population (2016)
  - Total: 19,218
- Time zone: UTC+3:30 (IRST)

Kalpush District (Persian: بخش کالپوش) is in Meyami County, Semnan province, Iran. Its capital is the city of Rezvan.

== History ==
In 2011, Meyami District was separated from Shahrud County in the establishment of Meyami County, which was divided into two districts and five rural districts, with Meyami as its capital and only city at the time. The village of Rezvan was converted to a city in 2020.

== Demographics ==
=== Population ===
At the time of the 2016 National Census, the district's population was 19,218 inhabitants in 6,035 households.

=== Administrative divisions ===
Kalpush District Population
Administrative Divisions	2016
Nardin RD	6,912
Rezvan RD (Note: Formerly Nardin Rural District)	12,306
Rezvan (city) (Note: Became a city after the 2016 census)	
Total	19,218
RD = Rural District
