= Central District (Tiran and Karvan County) =

District in Isfahan province, Iran

Central District (Tiran and Karvan County) Persian: بخش مرکزی شهرستان تیران و کرون
- District
- Location within Iran
- Coordinates: 32°41′N 51°03′E
- Country: Iran
- Province: Isfahan
- County: Tiran and Karvan
- Established: 1997
- Capital: Tiran

Population (2016)
  - Total: 38,889
- Time zone: UTC+3:30 (IRST)

The Central District of Tiran and Karvan County (Persian: بخش مرکزی شهرستان تیران و کرون) is in Isfahan province, Iran. Its capital is the city of Tiran.

== Demographics ==
=== Population ===
At the time of the 2006 National Census, the district's population was 32,917 in 9,407 households. The following census in 2011 counted 36,399 people in 11,286 households. The 2016 census measured the population of the district as 38,889 inhabitants in 12,556 households.

=== Administrative divisions ===
Central District (Tiran and Karvan County) Population
Administrative Divisions	2006	2011	2016
Rezvaniyeh RD	4,303	3,769	3,837
Varposht RD (Note: Formerly Karvan-e Sofla Rural District)	9,299	9,701	9,743
Rezvanshahr (city) (Note: Formerly the village of Shahrak-e Rezvan)	3,642	3,508	3,606
Tiran (city)	15,673	19,421	21,703
Total	32,917	36,399	38,889
RD = Rural District
