= Central District (Meyami County) =

District in Semnan province, Iran

Central District (Meyami County) Persian: بخش مرکزی شهرستان میامی
- District
- Location within Iran
- Coordinates: 36°32′N 56°05′E
- Country: Iran
- Province: Semnan
- County: Meyami
- Established: 2011
- Capital: Meyami

Population (2016)
  - Total: 19,500
- Time zone: UTC+3:30 (IRST)

The Central District of Meyami County (Persian: بخش مرکزی شهرستان میامی) is in Semnan province, Iran. Its capital is the city of Meyami.

== History ==
In 2011, Meyami District was separated from Shahrud County in the establishment of Meyami County, which was divided into two districts and five rural districts, with Meyami as its capital and only city at the time.

== Demographics ==
=== Population ===
At the time of the 2016 National Census, the district's population was 19,500 inhabitants in 6,446 households.

=== Administrative divisions ===
Central District (Meyami County) Population
Administrative Divisions	2016
Farumad RD	2,614
Kalateh Hay-ye Sharqi RD	5,503
Meyami RD	6,817
Meyami (city)	4,566
Total	19,500
RD = Rural District
