= Meyami County =

County in Semnan province, Iran

Meyami County Persian: شهرستان میامی
- County
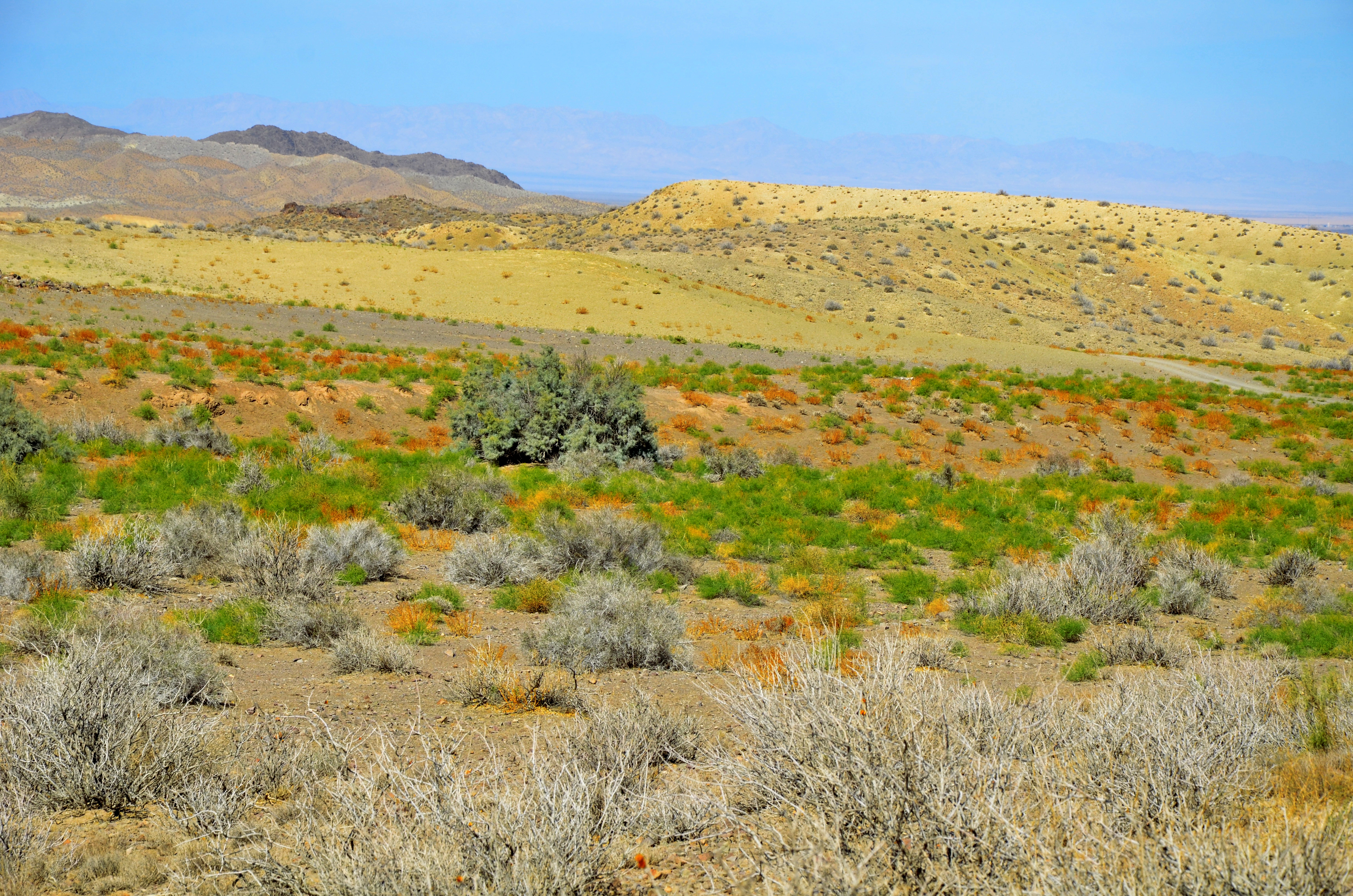
- Landscape in Khar Turan National Park

- Location of Meyami County in Semnan Province (right, pink)

- Location of Semnan province in Iran
- Coordinates: 36°46′N 56°06′E
- Country: Iran
- Province: Semnan
- Established: 2011
- Capital: Meyami
- Districts: Central, Kalpush

Population (2016)
  - Total: 38,718
- Time zone: UTC+3:30 (IRST)

Meyami County (Persian: شهرستان میامی) is in Semnan province, Iran. Its capital is the city of Meyami.

== History ==
In 2011, Meyami District was separated from Shahrud County in the establishment of Meyami County, which was divided into two districts and five rural districts, with Meyami as its capital and only city at the time. The village of Rezvan was converted to a city in 2020.

== Demographics ==
=== Population ===
At the time of the 2016 National Census, the county's population was 38,718 in 12,481 households.

=== Administrative divisions ===
Meyami County's population and administrative structure are shown in the following table.

Meyami County Population
Administrative Divisions	2016
Central District	19,500
Farumad RD	2,614
Kalateh Hay-ye Sharqi RD	5,503
Meyami RD	6,817
Meyami (city)	4,566
Kalpush District	19,218
Nardin RD	6,912
Rezvan RD (Note: Formerly Nardin Rural District)	12,306
Rezvan (city) (Note: Became a city after the 2016 census)	
Total	38,718
RD = Rural District

== See also ==
Media related to Meyami County at Wikimedia Commons
