= Meyami District =

Former district in Semnan province, Iran

Meyami District Persian: بخش میامی
- Former District
- Location within Iran
- Coordinates: 36°46′N 56°06′E
- Country: Iran
- Province: Semnan
- County: Shahrud
- Capital: Meyami

Population (2011)
  - Total: 37,258
- Time zone: UTC+3:30 (IRST)

Meyami District (Persian: بخش میامی) is a former administrative division of Shahrud County, Semnan province, Iran. Its capital was the city of Meyami.

== History ==
In 2011, the district was separated from the county in the establishment of Meyami County.

== Demographics ==
=== Population ===
At the time of the 2006 National Census, the district's population was 36,824 in 9,583 households. The following census in 2011 counted 37,258 people in 11,100 households.

=== Administrative divisions ===
Meyami District Population
| Administrative Divisions | 2006 | 2011 |
|---|---|---|
| Farumad RD | 3,472 | 2,575 |
| Kalateh Hay-ye Sharqi RD | 6,420 | 5,837 |
| Meyami RD | 6,524 | 5,358 |
| Nardin RD | 5,514 | 6,630 |
| Rezvan RD (Note: Formerly Nardin Rural District) | 10,837 | 12,296 |
| Meyami (city) | 4,057 | 4,562 |
| Total | 36,824 | 37,258 |
RD = Rural District
