= Shahrak-e Shahid Nowruzian =

Shahrak-e Shahid Nowruzian شهرک شهيد نوروزيان
- township
- Interactive map of Shahrak-e Shahid Nowruzian
- Coordinates: 36°27′18″N 53°6′44.24″E
- Country: Iran
- Province: Mazandaran
- County: Sari
- Bakhsh: Kolijan Rostaq
- Rural District: Kolijan Rostaq-e Olya

Population (2006)
  - Total: 817
- Time zone: UTC+3:30 (IRST)

Shahrak-e Shahid Nowruzian (Persian: شهرک شهيد نوروزيان, also Romanized as Shahrak-e Shahīd Nowrūzīān) is an abandoned township in Sari County, Mazandaran Province, Iran, built in Mazandaran Wood and paper industries complex.

Administratively, it located in Kolijan Rostaq-e Olya Rural District, part of Kolijan Rostaq District. At the 2006 census, its population was 817, in 248 families. In 2016, there no households residing in the township.
