= Kolijan Rostaq =

Kolijan Rostaq (Persian: کلیجان‌رستاق) may refer to:

- Kolijan Rostaq District
- Kolijan Rostaq-e Olya Rural District
- Kolijan Rostaq-e Sofla Rural District
