= Hular =

Hular (Persian: هولار) may refer to:

- Hular-e Olya
- Pain Hular
