= Darvar =

Darvar or Darwar (Persian: دروار) may refer to:

- Darvar, Kohgiluyeh and Boyer-Ahmad
- Darvar, Mazandaran
- Darvar, Semnan
