= Alamdar Deh =

Alamdar Deh علمدارده
- Village
- Location within Iran
- Coordinates: 36°22′34″N 53°14′59″E
- Country: Iran
- Province: Mazandaran
- County: Sari
- Bakhsh: Kolijan Rostaq
- Rural District: Tangeh Soleyman

Population (2016)
  - Total: 113
- Time zone: UTC+3:30 (IRST)
- Website: Alamdardeh

Alamdar Deh (Persian: علمدارده, also Romanized as ‘Alamdār Deh) is a village in Tangeh Soleyman Rural District, Kolijan Rostaq District, Sari County, Mazandaran Province, Iran. At the 2006 census, its population was 122, in 43 families. In 2016, its population was 113, in 47 households.
