= Alvi Kola =

Alvi Kola or Alavi Kola Olvi Kola (Persian: علويكلا) may refer to:

- Alavi Kola, Mahmudabad
- Alvi Kola, Nowshahr
- Alavi Kola, Sari
