= Chachkam =

Chachkam چاچكام
- Village
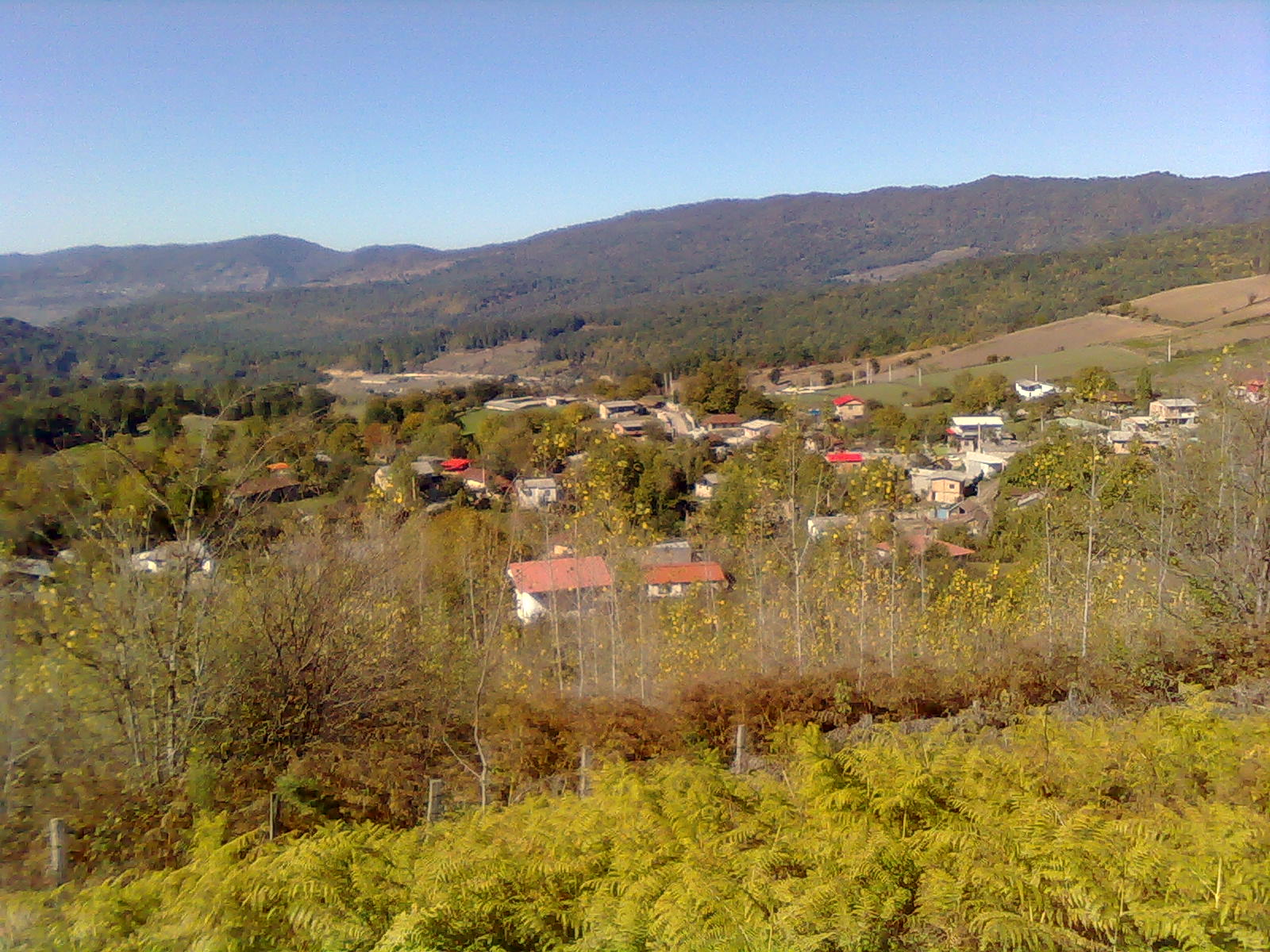

- Location within Iran
- Coordinates: 36°20′48″N 53°17′16″E
- Country: Iran
- Province: Mazandaran
- County: Sari
- Bakhsh: Kolijan Rostaq
- Rural District: Tangeh Soleyman

Population (2016)
  - Total: 49
- Time zone: UTC+3:30 (IRST)

Chachkam (Persian: چاچكام, also Romanized as Chāchkām and Chāch Kām; also known as Chāch) is a village in Tangeh Soleyman Rural District, Kolijan Rostaq District, Sari County, Mazandaran Province, Iran. At the 2016 census, its population was 49 people in 18 families, a decrease from 130 people in 2006.
