= Aboksar =

Aboksar (Persian: ابكسر) may refer to:

- Aboksar, Sari
- Aboksar, Kolijan Rostaq, Sari County
