= Dalak Kheyl =

Dalak Kheyl دلاک خيل
- Village
- Location within Iran
- Coordinates: 36°26′19″N 53°04′07″E
- Country: Iran
- Province: Mazandaran
- County: Sari
- Bakhsh: Kolijan Rostaq
- Rural District: Kolijan Rostaq-e Olya

Population (2016)
  - Total: 192
- Time zone: UTC+3:30 (IRST)

Dalak Kheyl (Persian: دلاک خيل, also Romanized as Dalāk Kheyl) is a village in Kolijan Rostaq-e Olya Rural District, Kolijan Rostaq District, Sari County, Mazandaran Province, Iran. At the 2006 census, its population was 199, in 51 families. In 2016, it had 192 people in 66 households.
