= Garm Rud =

Garm Rud گرمرود
- Village
- Location within Iran
- Coordinates: 36°26′29″N 53°09′26″E
- Country: Iran
- Province: Mazandaran
- County: Sari
- Bakhsh: Kolijan Rostaq
- Rural District: Kolijan Rostaq-e Olya

Population (2016)
  - Total: 158
- Time zone: UTC+3:30 (IRST)

Garm Rud (Persian: گرمرود, also Romanized as Garm Rūd) is a village in Kolijan Rostaq-e Olya Rural District, Kolijan Rostaq District, Sari County, Mazandaran Province, Iran. At the 2006 census, its population was 194, in 51 families. In 2016, it had 158 people in 59 households.
