= Larema =

Larema لارما
- Village
- Location within Iran
- Coordinates: 36°18′19″N 53°12′33″E
- Country: Iran
- Province: Mazandaran
- County: Sari
- Bakhsh: Kolijan Rostaq
- Rural District: Tangeh Soleyman

Population (2016)
  - Total: 65
- Time zone: UTC+3:30 (IRST)

Larema (Persian: لارما, also Romanized as Lāremā and Lārmā) is a village in Tangeh Soleyman Rural District, Kolijan Rostaq District, Sari County, Mazandaran Province, Iran. At the 2016 census, its population was 65, in 28 families.
