= Mashown Kola =

Mashown Kola مشون كلا
- Village
- Location within Iran
- Coordinates: 36°26′10″N 53°04′29″E
- Country: Iran
- Province: Mazandaran
- County: Sari
- Bakhsh: Kolijan Rostaq
- Rural District: Kolijan Rostaq-e Olya

Population (2016)
  - Total: 34
- Time zone: UTC+3:30 (IRST)

Mashown Kola (Persian: مشون كلا, also Romanized as Mashown Kolā) is a village in Kolijan Rostaq-e Olya Rural District, Kolijan Rostaq District, Sari County, Mazandaran Province, Iran. At the 2006 census, its population was 34, in 12 families. Up from 31 in 2006.
