= Salim Bahram =

Salim Bahram سليم بهرام
- Village
- Location within Iran
- Coordinates: 36°25′58″N 53°06′50″E
- Country: Iran
- Province: Mazandaran
- County: Sari
- Bakhsh: Kolijan Rostaq
- Rural District: Kolijan Rostaq-e Olya

Population (2016)
  - Total: 207
- Time zone: UTC+3:30 (IRST)

Salim Bahram (Persian: سليم بهرام, also Romanized as Salīm Bahrām) is a village in Kolijan Rostaq-e Olya Rural District, Kolijan Rostaq District, Sari County, Mazandaran Province, Iran. At the 2016 census, its population was 207, in 82 families. Up from 166 people in 2006.
