= Saqandin Kola =

Saqandin Kola سقندين كلا
- Village
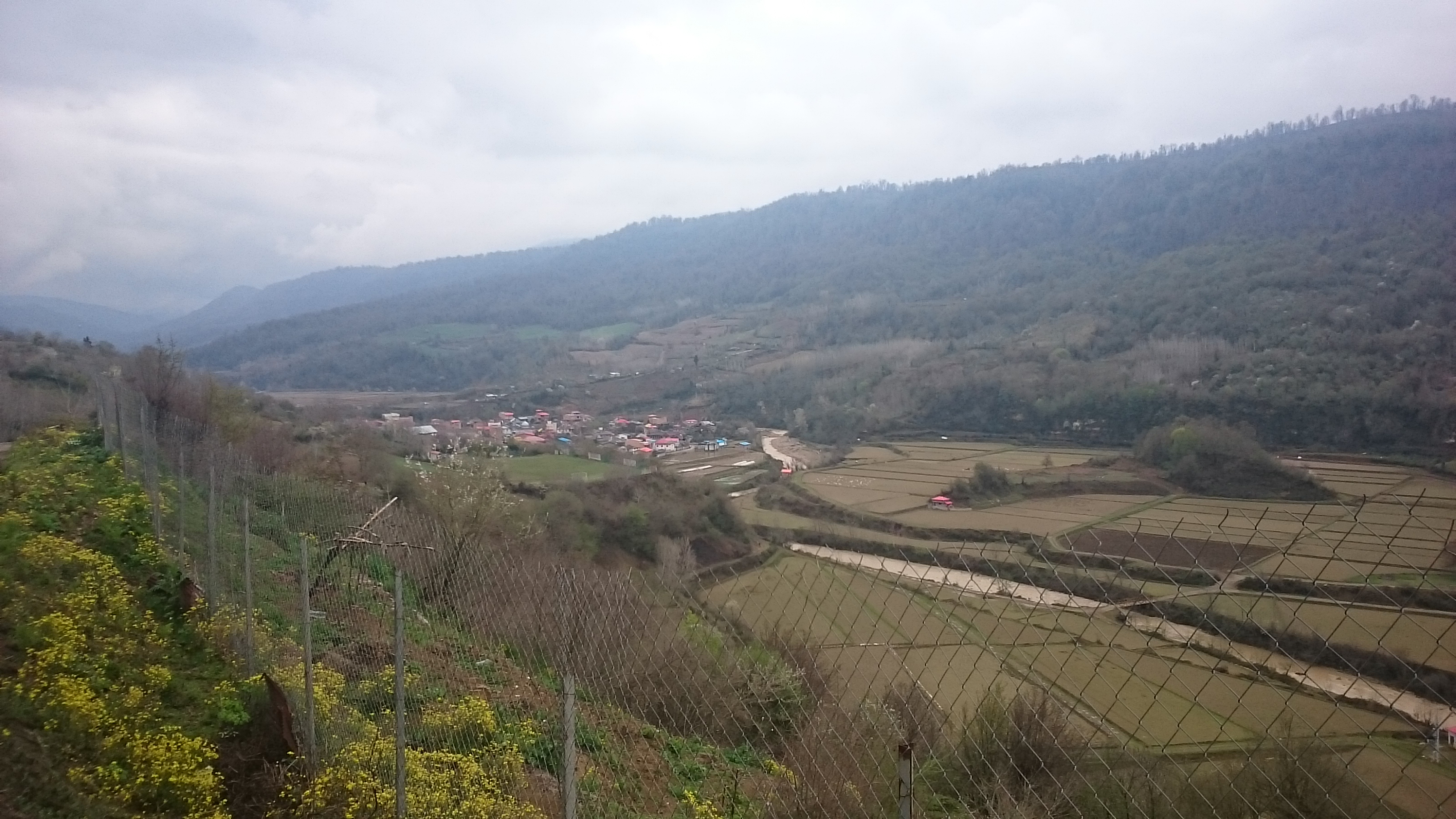

- Location within Iran
- Coordinates: 36°26′16″N 53°13′20″E
- Country: Iran
- Province: Mazandaran
- County: Sari
- Bakhsh: Kolijan Rostaq
- Rural District: Kolijan Rostaq-e Olya

Population (2006)
  - Total: 271
- Time zone: UTC+3:30 (IRST)

Saqandin Kola (Persian: سقندين كلا, also Romanized as Saqandīn Kolā; also known as Saqandī Kolā, Soqondī Kalā, Soqondī Kolā, and Sugundun) is a village in Kolijan Rostaq-e Olya Rural District, Kolijan Rostaq District, Sari County, Mazandaran Province, Iran. At the 2016 census, its population was 201, in 97 families. Down from 271 people in 2006.
