= Kola Kheyl =

Kola Kheyl كلاخيل
- Village
- Location within Iran
- Coordinates: 36°18′17″N 53°13′46″E
- Country: Iran
- Province: Mazandaran
- County: Sari
- Bakhsh: Kolijan Rostaq
- Rural District: Tangeh Soleyman

Population (2016)
  - Total: 56
- Time zone: UTC+3:30 (IRST)

Kola Kheyl (Persian: كلاخيل, also Romanized as Kolā Kheyl) is a village in Tangeh Soleyman Rural District, Kolijan Rostaq District, Sari County, Mazandaran Province, Iran. At the 2016 census, its population was 56, in 20 families. Down from 67 in 2006.
