= Varaki =

Varaki ورکی
- Village
- Location within Iran
- Coordinates: 36°17′45″N 53°08′57″E
- Country: Iran
- Province: Mazandaran
- County: Sari
- Bakhsh: Kolijan Rostaq
- Rural District: Tangeh Soleyman

Population (2016)
  - Total: 124
- Time zone: UTC+3:30 (IRST)

Varaki (Persian: ورکی, also Romanized as Varakī) is a village in Tangeh Soleyman Rural District, Kolijan Rostaq District, Sari County, Mazandaran Province, Iran. At the 2006 census, its population was 124, in 50 families. Decreased from 378 people in 2006.
