= Takam, Iran =

Village in Mazandaran province, Iran

Takam Persian: تاكام
- Village
- Location within Iran
- Coordinates: 36°21′20″N 53°09′56″E
- Country: Iran
- Province: Mazandaran
- County: Sari
- District: Kolijan Rostaq
- Rural District: Tangeh Soleyman

Population (2016)
  - Total: 153
- Time zone: UTC+3:30 (IRST)

Takam (Persian: تاكام) (Note: Also romanized as Tākām) is a village in Tangeh Soleyman Rural District of Kolijan Rostaq District in Sari County, Mazandaran province, Iran.

== Demographics ==
=== Population ===
At the time of the 2006 National Census, the village's population was 171 in 53 households. The following census in 2011 counted 131 people in 47 households. The 2016 census measured the population of the village as 153 people in 59 households.
