= Sar Kat =

Sar Kat سركت
- Village
- Location within Iran
- Coordinates: 36°24′47″N 53°09′57″E
- Country: Iran
- Province: Mazandaran
- County: Sari
- Bakhsh: Kolijan Rostaq
- Rural District: Kolijan Rostaq-e Olya

Population (2016)
  - Total: 223
- Time zone: UTC+3:30 (IRST)

Sar Kat (Persian: سركت) is a village in Kolijan Rostaq-e Olya Rural District, Kolijan Rostaq District, Sari County, Mazandaran Province, Iran. At the 2016 census, its population was 223, in 79 families. Up from 210 in 2006.
