= Muhammad bin Fadlallah al-Sarawi =

Iranian-Iraqi faqih, writer and poet

Sayyid Muhammad bin Fadlallah al-Sarawi
- محمد بن فضل‌الله ساروی
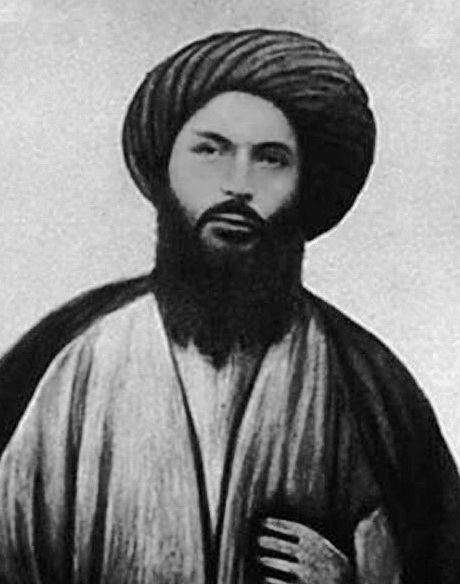
- A portrait painting of Al-Sarawi
- Born: c. 1880; Sari, Tabaristan, Sublime State of Persia
- Died: May 1924; Najaf, Kingdom of Iraq
- Resting place: Najaf
- Occupations: Islamic jurist; writer; poet
- Writing career
- Pen name: Hashemi
- Language: Persian and Arabic
- Genre: Religious literature
- Subjects: Ja'fari jurisprudence, Arabic and Persian Islamic poetry

Sayyid Muhammad bin Fadlallah al-Sarawi (Arabic: محمد بن فضل الله الساروي, romanized: Muḥammad bin Faḍlallāh al-Sārawī, Persian: محمد بن فضل‌الله ساروی, romanized: Muhammad ben Fazlollāh Sārawī), honorifically titled as Thiqat al-Islam (Arabic: ثقةالاسلام), also known as Muhammad Thiqat al-Islam (Arabic: محمد ثقة الإسلام, romanized: Muḥammad Thiqat al-Islām; c. 1880 – May 1924) was an Iranian-Iraqi Ja'fari jurist, writer and poet. He has been renowned at the end of the Qajar era, i.e. the early twentieth century, as a bilingual poet in Persian and Arabic. He was born in Pahneh Kola, a village of Sari to a Tabari Musawi family. He first started his religious educations with his father then moved to Ottoman Iraq and studied from ulema of Najaf and Samarra, such as Mirza Shirazi. His efforts to promote da'wah in Iran failed. As a Twelver Shia mujtahid, he settled in Najaf from 1901 until his death, left behind two poetry collections and many books on fiqh, most of them are manuscript.

== Biography ==
His nasab is Muhammad bin Fadlallah bin Khudadad bin Mir-Rashid bin Hamzah bin Aqa-Beig... ends to Ibrahim ibn Musa al-Kazim, Al-Musawi Al-Tabaristani al-Sarawi al-Gharavi. He was born and rose in Pahneh Kola, Sari, Tabaristan under Qajar rule. His birth year is unknown.

He studied the principles of Ja'fari jurisprudence and Arabic language sciences from his father first, then emigrated to Ottoman Iraq and studied under a group of Najaf's ulema, passed some grades then moved to Samarra and learned from Mirza Shirazi. Then he returned to Najaf and became a student of Habibullah Rashti for eight years. After finishing his religious education, he returned to Iran to promote da'wah, but failed due to poor public acceptance and produced some antagonism. He returned to Iraq in 1901. In Najaf, he continued his religious scholarly activities, focused on reading, researching, writing, and composing poetry in both Arabic and Persian languages. He taught in one of the mosques of Najaf. Al-Sarawi has been isolated from society in his last years, until he died in May 1924/ Shawwal 1342 AH in Najaf, Kingdom of Iraq.

== Poetry ==
Al-Sarawi was a literary poet in both Persian and Arabic, and his pen name was “Al-Hashimi or Hashemi” (Persian: هاشمی). He wrote two poetry collections, one in Persian Anwār al-Hudā (1913) and one in Arabic Mishkāt al-Anwār, not published. Al Babtain dictionary of contemporary Arab poets described him a "A traditional poet, he wrote for the purposes of his time, such as ghazal, praise, rithā' and poetic debates. What we got from his poetry is a poem of symbolic ghazal in which he preserved the Arabic traditional poetry forms".

== Works ==
Fiqh:

- Arabic: أنوار الأصول في علم الأصول, romanized: Anwār al-uṣūl fī ʻilm al-uṣūl, five volumes
- Arabic: أنوار الأحكام, romanized: Anwār al-aḥkām, three volumes
- Arabic: مشارق الأنوار, romanized: Mashāriq al-anwār
- Arabic: رسالة في سهو الإمام والمأموم, romanized: Risālat fī sahw al-Imam wa al-Ma'mum
- Arabic: رسالة في حكم كثير الشك, romanized: Risālat fī hokm kathir al-shak
- Arabic: رسالة في أحكام الجبائر, romanized: Risālat fī ahkam al-Jaba'yir
- Arabic: أخبار الأئمة, romanized: akhbār al-aʼimmah
- Arabic: أنوار الإسلام في علم الإمام عليه السّلام, romanized: Anwār al-Islām fī ʻIlm al-Imam ʻalayha al-salām

Poetry collections:

- Arabic: مشكاة الأنوار, romanized: Mishkāt al-Anwār
- Persian: انوار الهدی, romanized: Anwār al-Hudā., 1913
