= Pahneh Kola =

Pahneh Kola or Pahneh Kala (Persian: پهنه كلا) may refer to either of two villages in Sari County, Iran:

- Pahneh Kola-ye Jonubi (South Paneh Kola)
- Pahneh Kola-ye Shomali (North Paneh Kola)
