= Garmestan =

Garmestan گرمستان
- Village
- Location within Iran
- Coordinates: 36°25′29″N 53°09′19″E
- Country: Iran
- Province: Mazandaran
- County: Sari
- Bakhsh: Kolijan Rostaq
- Rural District: Kolijan Rostaq-e Olya

Population (2016)
  - Total: 95
- Time zone: UTC+3:30 (IRST)

Garmestan (Persian: گرمستان, also Romanized as Garmestān and Germestān; also known as Gīārmistān) is a village in Kolijan Rostaq-e Olya Rural District, Kolijan Rostaq District, Sari County, Mazandaran Province, Iran. At the 2016 census, its population was 95, in 39 families. Up from 85 in 2006.
