= Rudbar-e Naqib Deh =

Rudbar-e Naqib Deh رودبارنقيب ده
- Village
- Interactive map of Rudbar-e Naqib Deh
- Coordinates: 36°20′45.838″N 53°17′9.794″E
- Country: Iran
- Province: Mazandaran
- County: Sari
- Bakhsh: Kolijan Rostaq
- Rural District: Tangeh Soleyman

Population (2006)
  - Total: 10
- Time zone: UTC+3:30 (IRST)

Rudbar-e Naqib Deh (Persian: رودبارنقيب ده, also Romanized as Rūdbār-e Naqīb Deh) is a village in Tangeh Soleyman Rural District, Kolijan Rostaq District, Sari County, Mazandaran Province, Iran. It was formerly in Chahardangeh-ye Sourtchi rural district.

== Population History ==
Population history
Year	Pop.	±%
1976	16	—
2006	10	−37.5%
2016	0	−100.0%

Rudbar-e Naqib Deh was first mentioned at the 1976 census, when it had only 2 resident families, and it had no facilities. The village was not mentioned in the 1986 census.

At the 2006 census, its population was 10, in 4 families.

The village was noted in 2011 census, but it had less than 4 households. There were no households residing in the village in 2016.
