= Salim Sheykh =

Salim Sheykh سليم شيخ
- Village
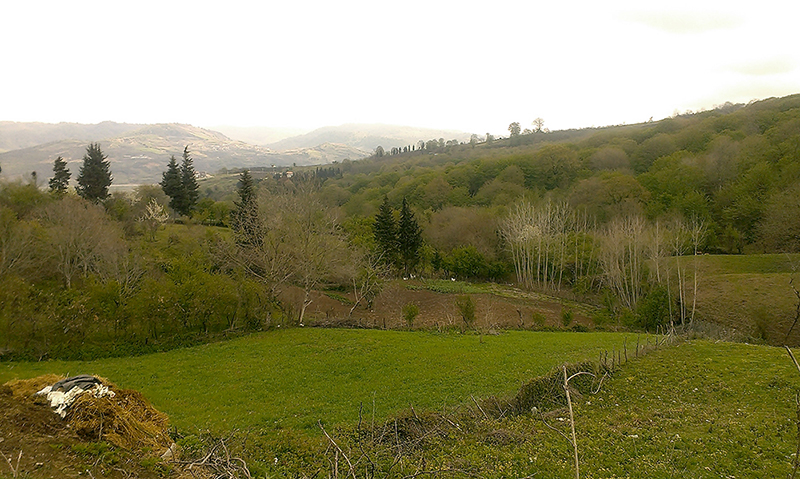

- Location within Iran
- Coordinates: 36°26′23″N 53°06′12″E
- Country: Iran
- Province: Mazandaran
- County: Sari
- Bakhsh: Kolijan Rostaq
- Rural District: Kolijan Rostaq-e Olya

Population (2016)
  - Total: 94
- Time zone: UTC+3:30 (IRST)

Salim Sheykh (Persian: سليم شيخ, also Romanized as Salīm Sheykh) is a village in Kolijan Rostaq-e Olya Rural District, Kolijan Rostaq District, Sari County, Mazandaran Province, Iran. At the 2016 census, its population was 94, in 33 families. Up from 53 people in 2006.
