= Arzefun =

Village in Mazandaran province, Iran

Arzefun Persian: ارزفون
- Village
- Location within Iran
- Coordinates: 36°24′42″N 53°02′43″E
- Country: Iran
- Province: Mazandaran
- County: Sari
- District: Kolijan Rostaq
- Rural District: Kolijan Rostaq-e Olya

Population (2016)
  - Total: 268
- Time zone: UTC+3:30 (IRST)

Arzefun (Persian: ارزفون) (Note: Also romanized as Arzefūn and Arzfūn) is a village in Kolijan Rostaq-e Olya Rural District of Kolijan Rostaq District in Sari County, Mazandaran province, Iran.

== Demographics ==
=== Population ===
At the time of the 2006 National Census, the village's population was 259 in 81 households. The following census in 2011 counted 267 people in 87 households. The 2016 census measured the population of the village as 268 people in 105 households.
