= Shekta =

Village in Mazandaran province, Iran

Shekta Persian: شكتا
- Village
- Location within Iran
- Coordinates: 36°28′00″N 53°04′41″E
- Country: Iran
- Province: Mazandaran
- County: Sari
- District: Kolijan Rostaq
- Rural District: Kolijan Rostaq-e Olya

Population (2016)
  - Total: 984
- Time zone: UTC+3:30 (IRST)

Shekta (Persian: شكتا) (Note: Also romanized as Sheketā and Shektā; also known as Shegtā) is a village in Kolijan Rostaq-e Olya Rural District of Kolijan Rostaq District in Sari County, Mazandaran province, Iran.

== Demographics ==
=== Population ===
At the time of the 2006 National Census, the village's population was 888 in 228 households. The following census in 2011 counted 890 people in 257 households. The 2016 census measured the population of the village as 984 people in 308 households.
