= Shab Kola =

Shab Kola شب كلا
- Village
- Location within Iran
- Coordinates: 36°26′17″N 53°11′45″E
- Country: Iran
- Province: Mazandaran
- County: Sari
- Bakhsh: Kolijan Rostaq
- Rural District: Kolijan Rostaq-e Olya

Population (2016)
  - Total: 117
- Time zone: UTC+3:30 (IRST)

Shab Kola (Persian: شب كلا, also Romanized as Shab Kolā) is a village in Kolijan Rostaq-e Olya Rural District, Kolijan Rostaq District, Sari County, Mazandaran Province, Iran. At the 2006 census, its population was 117, in 46 families. Up from 110 in 2006.
