= Rig Cheshmeh, Sari =

Village in Mazandaran province, Iran

Rig Cheshmeh Persian: ريگ چشمه
- Village
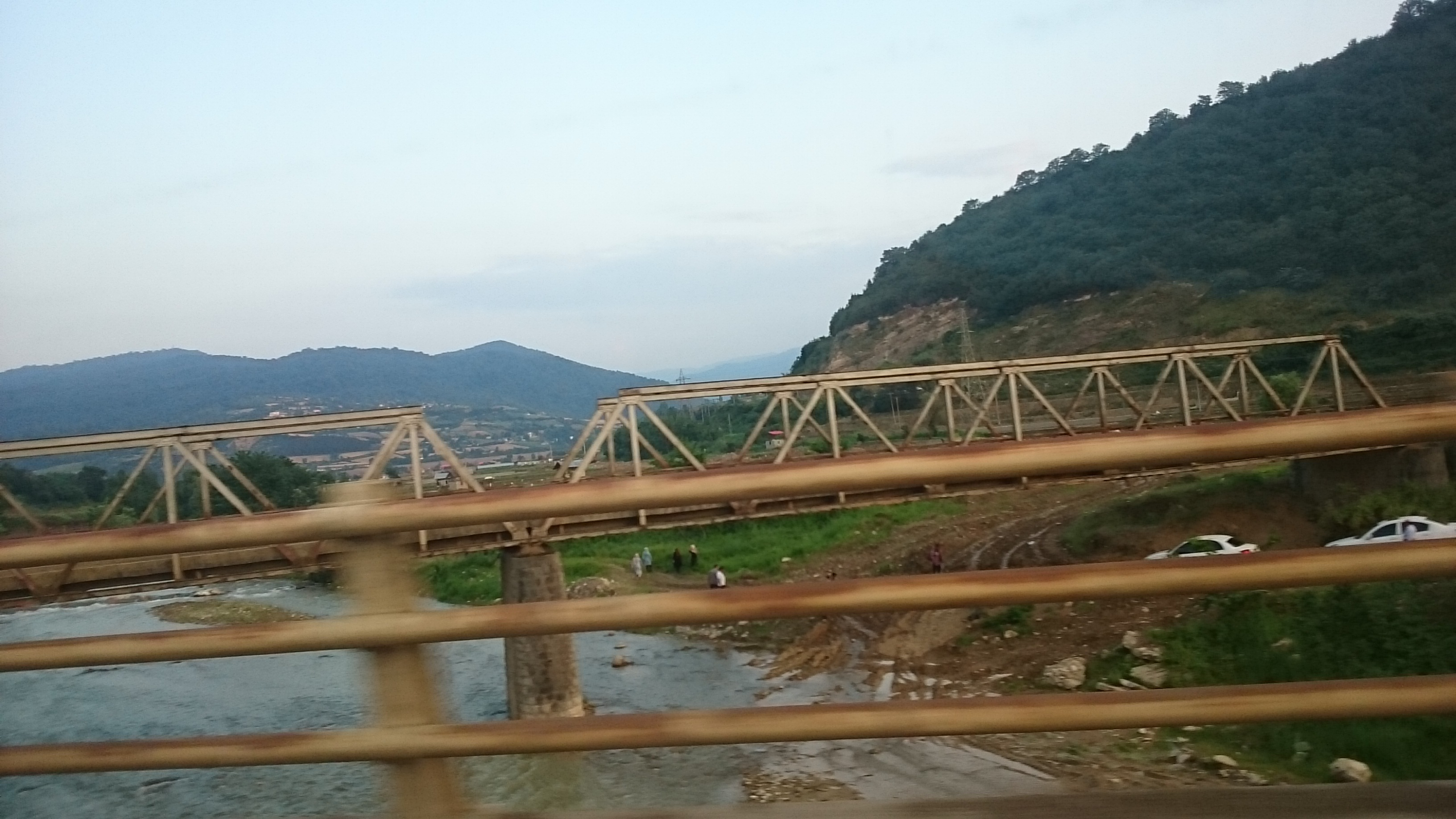
- Takam Bridge

- Location within Iran
- Coordinates: 36°21′53″N 53°10′07″E
- Country: Iran
- Province: Mazandaran
- County: Sari
- District: Kolijan Rostaq
- Rural District: Tangeh Soleyman

Population (2016)
  - Total: 73
- Time zone: UTC+3:30 (IRST)

Rig Cheshmeh (Persian: ريگ چشمه) (Note: Also romanized as Rīg Cheshmeh) is a village in, and the capital of, Tangeh Soleyman Rural District in Kolijan Rostaq District of Sari County, Mazandaran province, Iran.

== Demographics ==
=== Population ===
At the time of the 2006 National Census, the village's population was 90 in 29 households. The following census in 2011 counted 62 people in 26 households. The 2016 census measured the population of the village as 73 people in 29 households.
