= Palesk =

Palesk پلسک
- Village
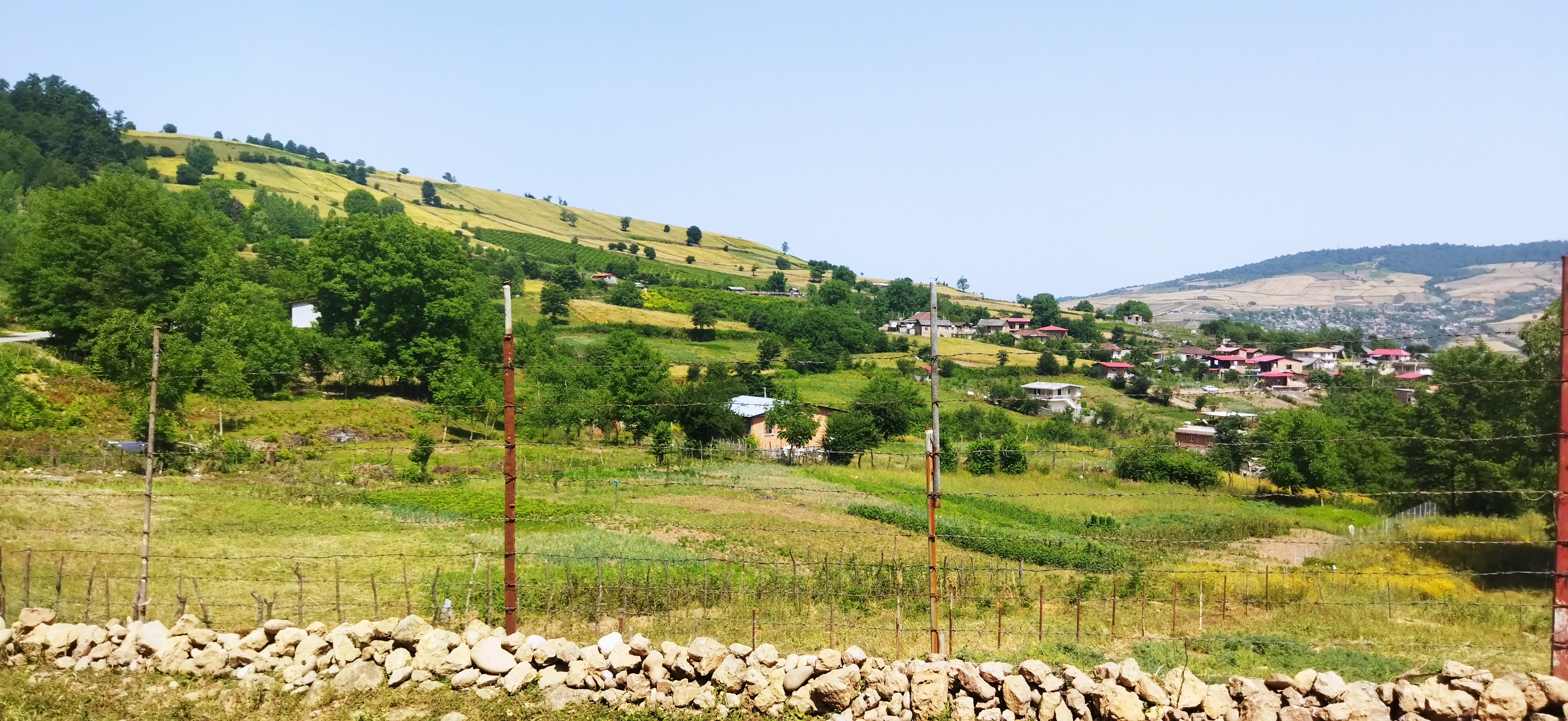
- Pelesk in 2022

- Location within Iran
- Coordinates: 36°16′45″N 53°14′49″E
- Country: Iran
- Province: Mazandaran
- County: Sari
- Bakhsh: Kolijan Rostaq
- Rural District: Tangeh Soleyman

Population (2016)
  - Total: 45
- Time zone: UTC+3:30 (IRST)

Palesk (Persian: پلسک, also Romanized as Pelesk) is a village in Tangeh Soleyman Rural District, Kolijan Rostaq District, Sari County, Mazandaran Province, Iran. At the 2016 census, its population was 45, in 21 families. Decreased from 100 people in 2006.
