= Darupey =

Darupey دروپی
- Village
- Location within Iran
- Coordinates: 36°27′12″N 53°08′53″E
- Country: Iran
- Province: Mazandaran
- County: Sari
- Bakhsh: Kolijan Rostaq
- Rural District: Kolijan Rostaq-e Olya
- Elevation: 200 m (660 ft)

Population (2016)
  - Total: 153
- Time zone: UTC+3:30 (IRST)

Darupey (Persian: دروپی, also Romanized as Darūpey, Daroopey, and Darow Pay) is a village in Kolijan Rostaq-e Olya Rural District, Kolijan Rostaq District, Sari County, Mazandaran Province, Iran. At the 2016 census, its population was 153, in 56 families. Decreased from 212 people in 2006.

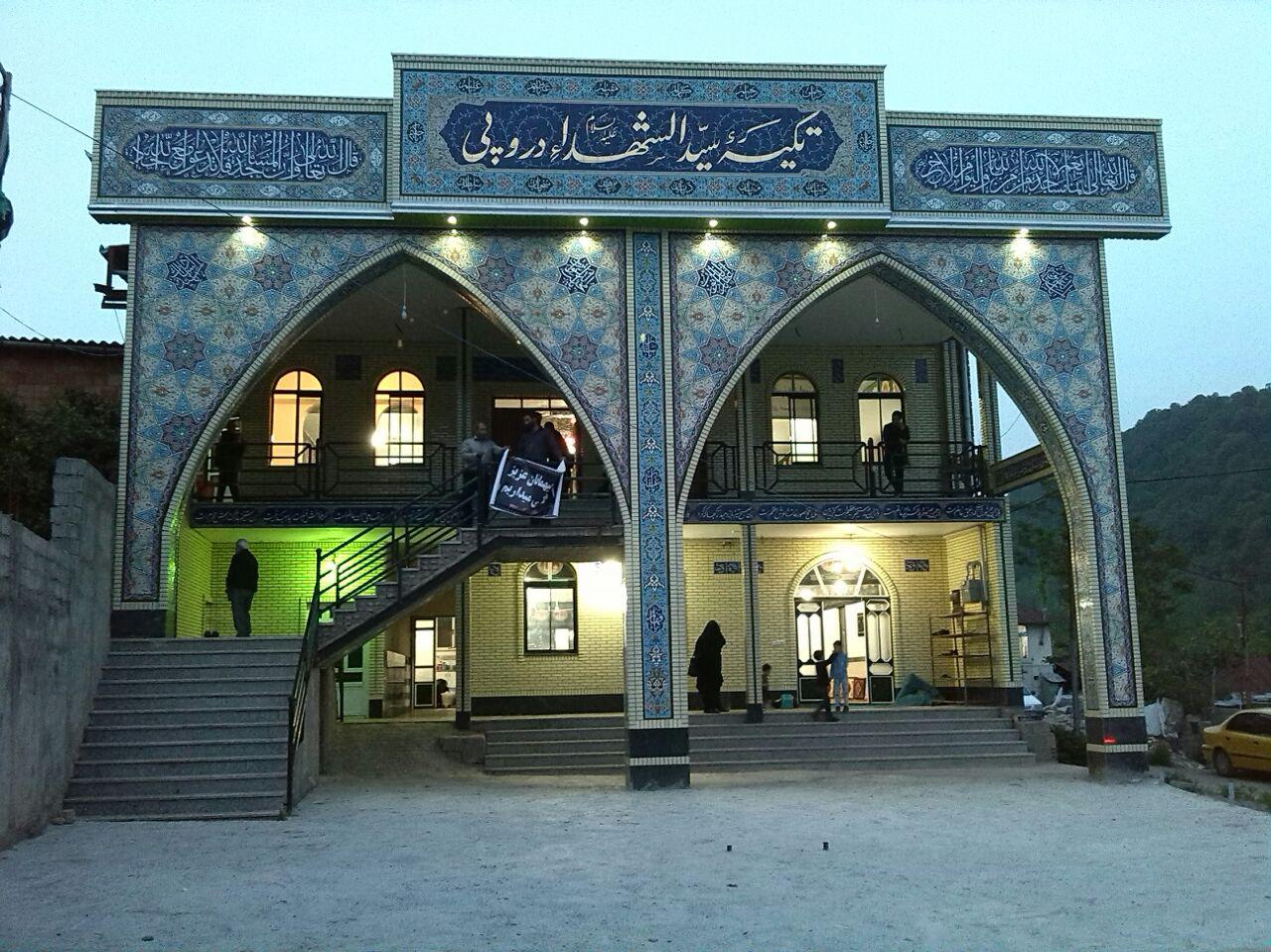
Hosseinieh

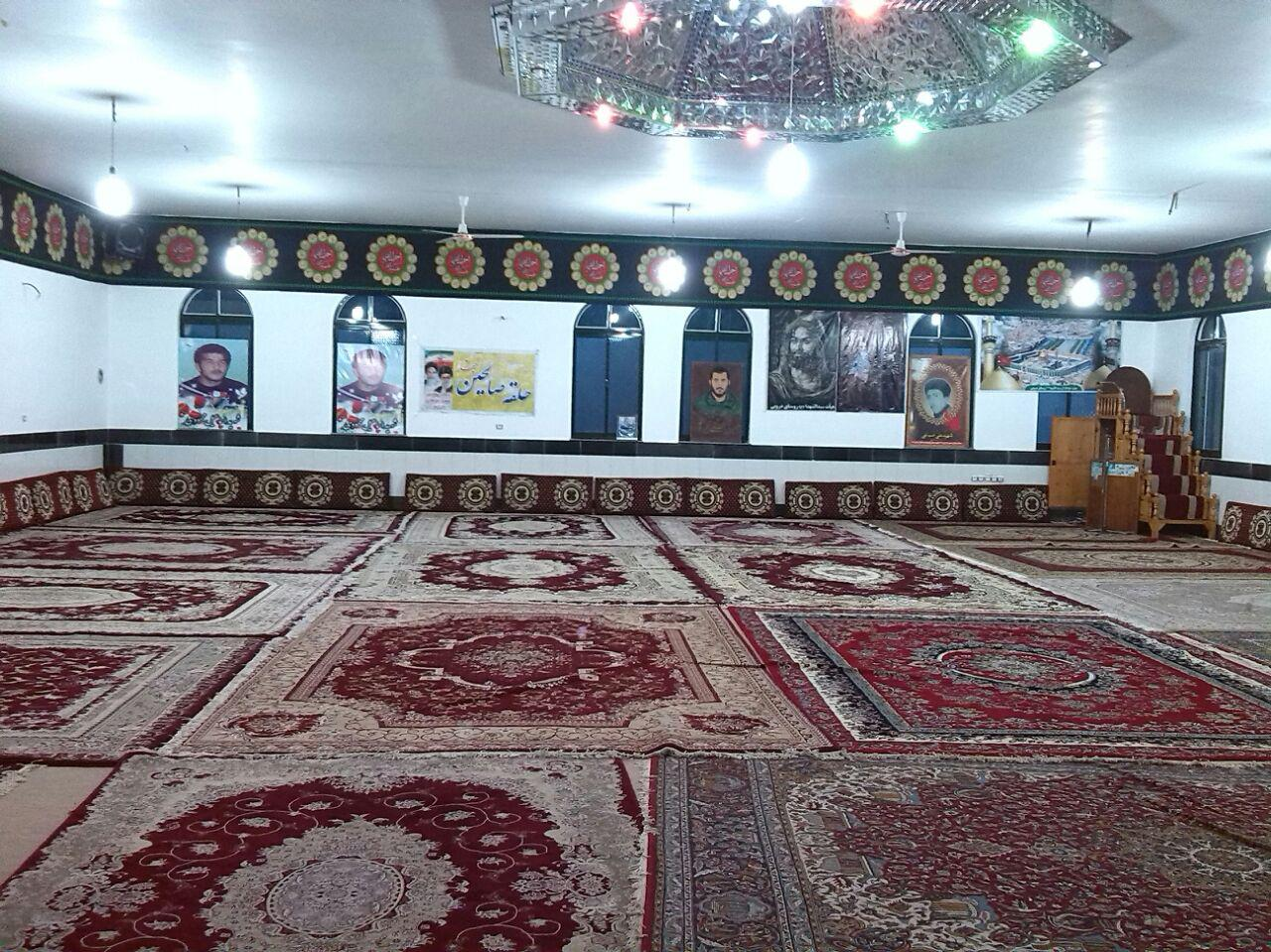
Hosseinieh

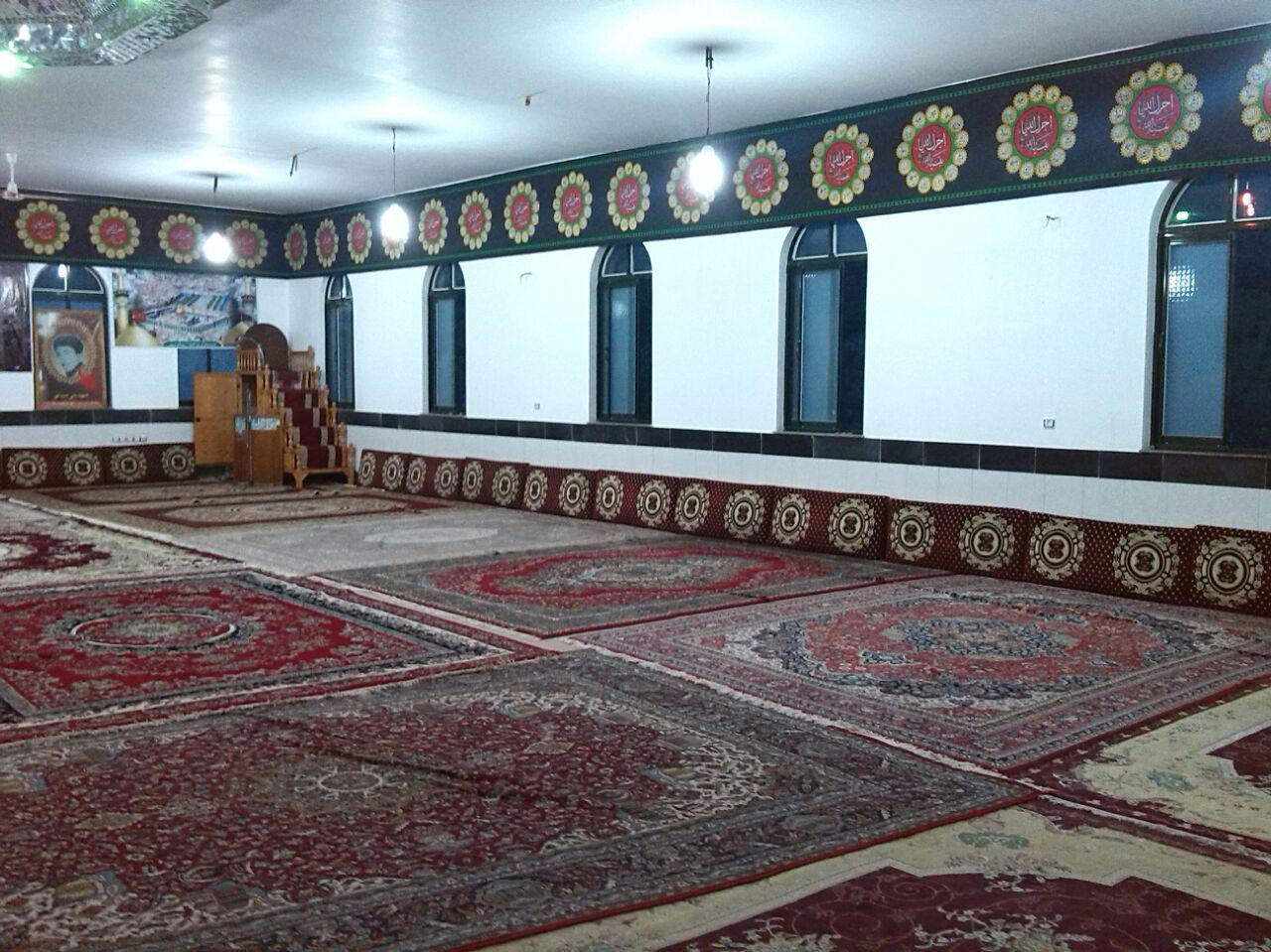
Hosseinieh

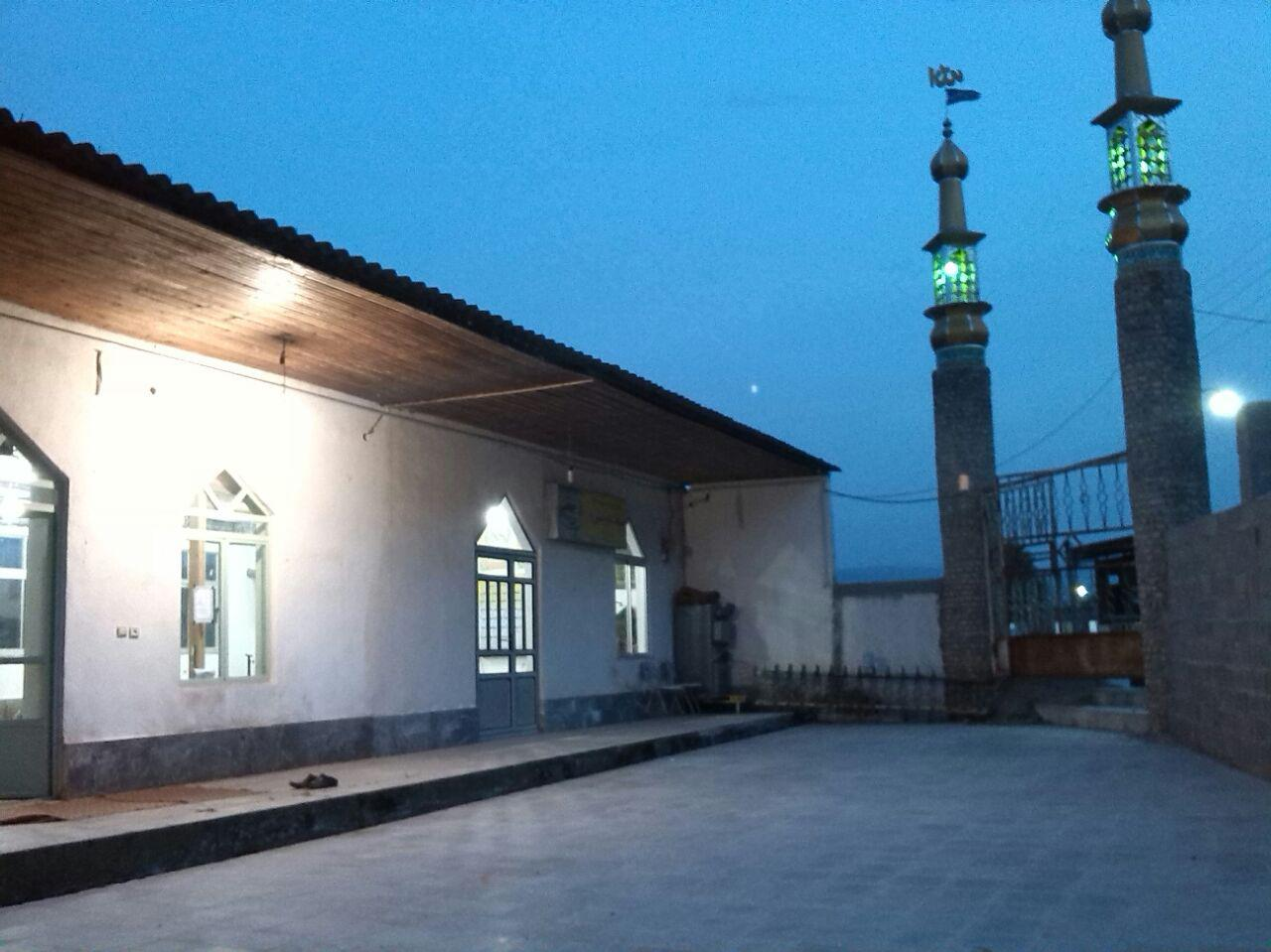
Mosque

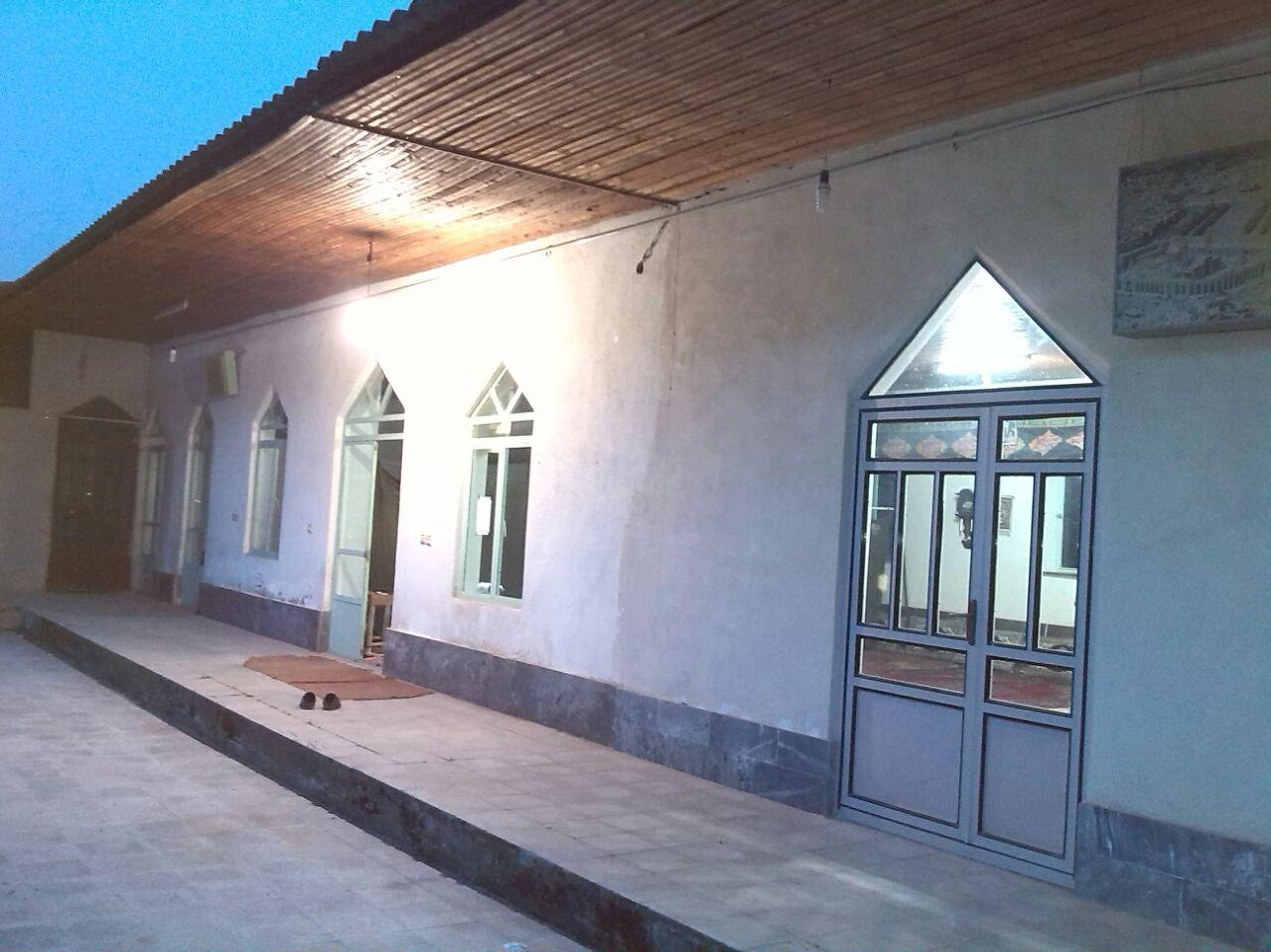
Mosque

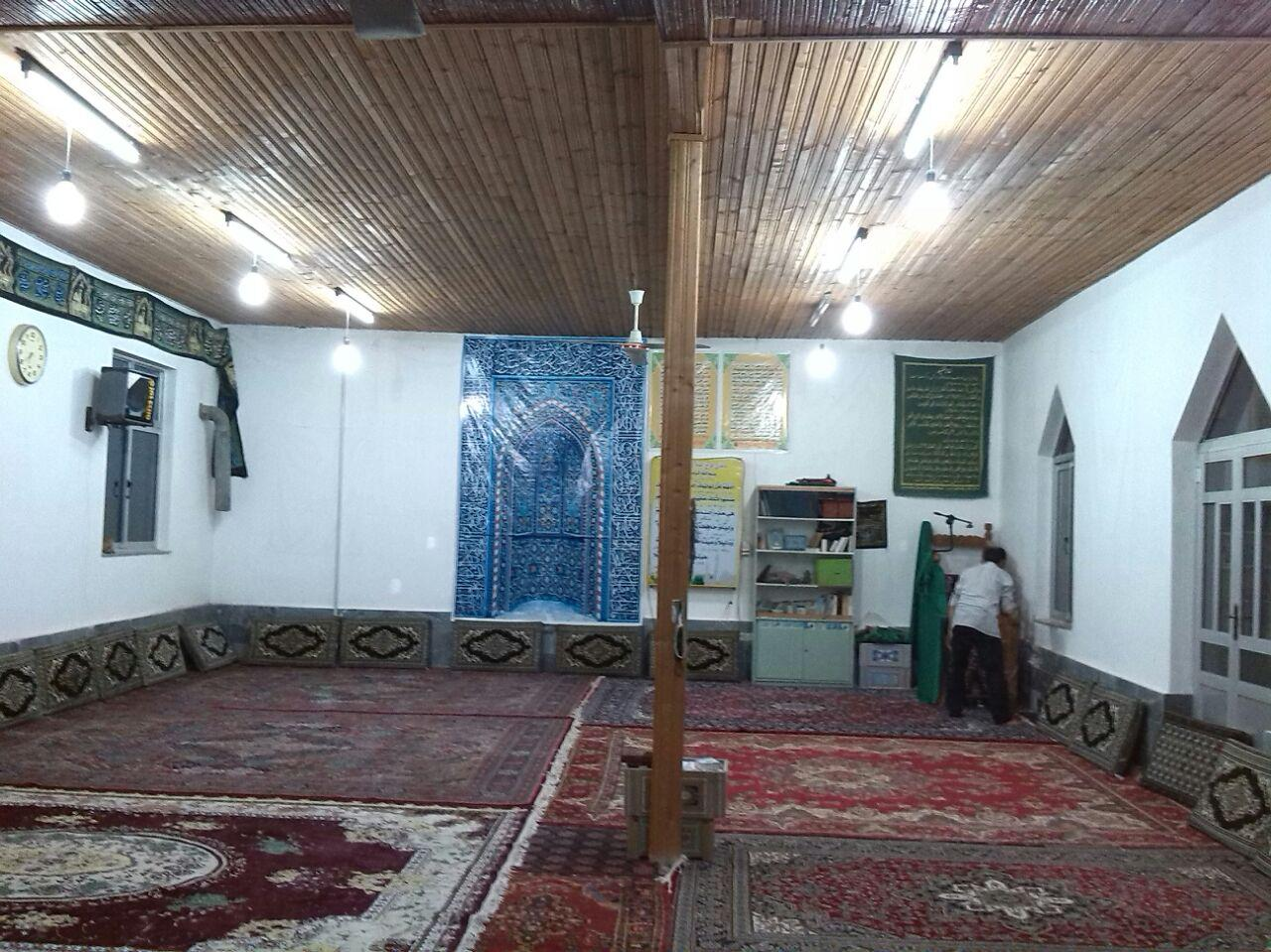
Mosque
