= Yademan =

Yademan خرچنگ، يادمان
- Village
- Interactive map of Yademan
- Coordinates: 36°22′54.624″N 53°10′27.678″E
- Country: Iran
- Province: Mazandaran
- County: Sari
- Bakhsh: Kolijan Rostaq
- Rural District: Tangeh Soleyman

Population (2016)
  - Total: 79
- Time zone: UTC+3:30 (IRST)

Yademan (Persian: يادمان, also Romanized as Yādemān), better known by its former name, Kharchang (Persian: خرچنگ), is a village in Tangeh Soleyman Rural District, Kolijan Rostaq District, Sari County, Mazandaran Province, Iran. The name of Kharchang was changed to Yademan in 2004.

At the 2016 census, it had 34 households and a population of 79 people, up from 66 people in 2006.
