= Aq Mashhad-e Kamar Kheyl =

Aq Mashhad-e Kamar Kheyl آق مشهد كمرخيل
- Village
- Location within Iran
- Coordinates: 36°20′46″N 53°07′33″E
- Country: Iran
- Province: Mazandaran
- County: Sari
- Bakhsh: Kolijan Rostaq
- Rural District: Tangeh Soleyman

Population (2006)
  - Total: 175
- Time zone: UTC+3:30 (IRST)

Aq Mashhad-e Kamar Kheyl (Persian: آق مشهد كمرخيل, also Romanized as Āq Mashhad-e Kamar Kheyl; also known as Kamar Kheyl) is a village in Tangeh Soleyman Rural District, Kolijan Rostaq District, Sari County, Mazandaran Province, Iran. At the 2016 census, its population was 116, in 46 families. Decreased from 175 people in 2006.
