= Now Deh, Kolijan Rostaq =

Village in Mazandaran province, Iran

Now Deh Persian: نوده
- Village
- Location within Iran
- Coordinates: 36°22′40″N 53°10′00″E
- Country: Iran
- Province: Mazandaran
- County: Sari
- District: Kolijan Rostaq
- Rural District: Tangeh Soleyman

Population (2016)
  - Total: 165
- Time zone: UTC+3:30 (IRST)

Now Deh (Persian: نوده) is a village in Tangeh Soleyman Rural District of Kolijan Rostaq District in Sari County, Mazandaran province, Iran.

== Demographics ==
=== Population ===
At the time of the 2006 National Census, the village's population was 164 in 51 households. The following census in 2011 counted 147 people in 53 households. The 2016 census measured the population of the village as 165 people in 56 households.
