= Vastan =

Vastan واستان
- Village
- Location within Iran
- Coordinates: 36°20′14″N 53°09′23″E
- Country: Iran
- Province: Mazandaran
- County: Sari
- Bakhsh: Kolijan Rostaq
- Rural District: Tangeh Soleyman

Population (2016)
  - Total: 119
- Time zone: UTC+3:30 (IRST)

Vastan (Persian: واستان, also Romanized as Vāstān) is a village in Tangeh Soleyman Rural District, Kolijan Rostaq District, Sari County, Mazandaran Province, Iran. At the 2006 census, its population was 120, in 39 families. In 2016, its population was 119, in 46 households.
