= Parvarijabad =

Village in Mazandaran province, Iran

Parvarijabad Persian: پروريج اباد
- Village
- Location within Iran
- Coordinates: 36°15′58″N 53°19′13″E
- Country: Iran
- Province: Mazandaran
- County: Sari
- District: Kolijan Rostaq
- Rural District: Tangeh Soleyman

Population (2016)
  - Total: 194
- Time zone: UTC+3:30 (IRST)

Parvarijabad (Persian: پروريج اباد) (Note: Also romanized as Parvarījābād; also known as Parvanābād) is a village in Tangeh Soleyman Rural District of Kolijan Rostaq District in Sari County, Mazandaran province, Iran.

== Demographics ==
=== Population ===
At the time of the 2006 National Census, the village's population was 283 in 78 households. The following census in 2011 counted 261 people in 75 households. The 2016 census measured the population of the village as 261 people in 75 households.
