= Sang Bon, Mazandaran =

Sang Bon سنگ بن
- Village
- Location within Iran
- Coordinates: 36°26′55″N 53°06′45″E
- Country: Iran
- Province: Mazandaran
- County: Sari
- Bakhsh: Kolijan Rostaq
- Rural District: Kolijan Rostaq-e Olya

Population (2016)
  - Total: 222
- Time zone: UTC+3:30 (IRST)

Sang Bon (Persian: سنگ بن) is a village in Kolijan Rostaq-e Olya Rural District, Kolijan Rostaq District, Sari County, Mazandaran Province, Iran. At the 2006 census, its population was 243, in 57 families. In 2016, it had 222 people in 78 households.
