= Rudbar Kola =

Rudbar Kola رودباركلا
- Village
- Location within Iran
- Coordinates: 36°26′25″N 53°13′52″E
- Country: Iran
- Province: Mazandaran
- County: Sari
- Bakhsh: Kolijan Rostaq
- Rural District: Kolijan Rostaq-e Olya

Population (2016)
  - Total: 119
- Time zone: UTC+3:30 (IRST)

Rudbar Kola (Persian: رودباركلا, also Romanized as Rūdbār Kolā) is a village in Kolijan Rostaq-e Olya Rural District, Kolijan Rostaq District, Sari County, Mazandaran Province, Iran. At the 2006 census, its population was 146, in 47 families. In 2016, its population was 119, in 49 households.
