= Bala Kula =

Bala Kula بالاكولا
- Village
- Location within Iran
- Coordinates: 36°27′25″N 53°08′24″E
- Country: Iran
- Province: Mazandaran
- County: Sari
- Bakhsh: Kolijan Rostaq
- Rural District: Kolijan Rostaq-e Olya

Population (2016)
  - Total: 185
- Time zone: UTC+3:30 (IRST)

Bala Kula (Persian: بالاكولا, also Romanized as Bālā Kūlā; also known as Bālā Kolā) is a village in Kolijan Rostaq-e Olya Rural District, Kolijan Rostaq District, Sari County, Mazandaran province, Iran. At the 2006 census, its population was 203, in 47 families. In 2016, it had 185 people in 61 households.
