= Golurd =

Village in Mazandaran province, Iran

Golurd Persian: گلورد
- Village
- Location within Iran
- Coordinates: 36°23′51″N 53°10′20″E
- Country: Iran
- Province: Mazandaran
- County: Sari
- District: Kolijan Rostaq
- Rural District: Tangeh Soleyman

Population (2016)
  - Total: 222
- Time zone: UTC+3:30 (IRST)

Golurd (Persian: گلورد) (Note: Also romanized as Golūrd) is a village in Tangeh Soleyman Rural District of Kolijan Rostaq District in Sari County, Mazandaran province, Iran.

== Demographics ==
=== Population ===
At the time of the 2006 National Census, the village's population was 223 in 63 households. The following census in 2011 counted 178 people in 56 households. The 2016 census measured the population of the village as 222 people in 76 households.
