= Gardeshi =

Gardeshi گردشي
- Village
- Location within Iran
- Coordinates: 36°20′20″N 53°11′20″E
- Country: Iran
- Province: Mazandaran
- County: Sari
- Bakhsh: Kolijan Rostaq
- Rural District: Tangeh Soleyman

Population (2016)
  - Total: 128
- Time zone: UTC+3:30 (IRST)

Gardeshi (Persian: گردشي, also Romanized as Gardeshī) is a village in Tangeh Soleyman Rural District, Kolijan Rostaq District, Sari County, Mazandaran Province, Iran. At the 2016 census, its population was 128, in 49 families. Down from 191 people in 2006.
