= Naqib Deh =

Naqib Deh نقيب ده
- Village
- Location within Iran
- Coordinates: 36°22′40″N 53°17′25″E
- Country: Iran
- Province: Mazandaran
- County: Sari
- Bakhsh: Kolijan Rostaq
- Rural District: Tangeh Soleyman

Population (2006)
  - Total: 113
- Time zone: UTC+3:30 (IRST)

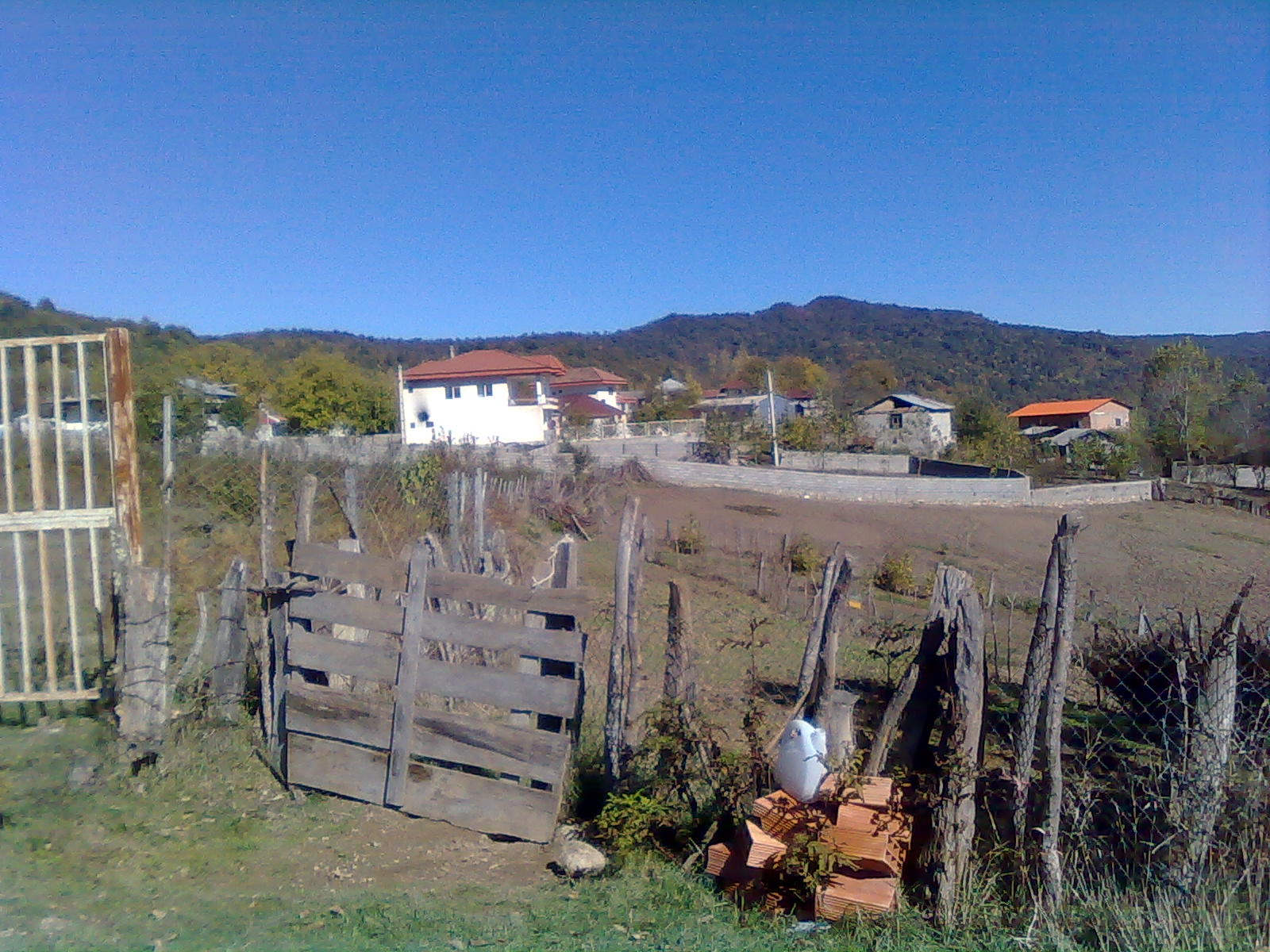

Naqib Deh (Persian: نقيب ده, also Romanized as Naqīb Deh) is a village in Tangeh Soleyman Rural District, Kolijan Rostaq District, Sari County, Mazandaran Province, Iran. At the 2006 census, its population was 82, in 31 families. Down from 113 people in 2006.
