= Meydanak, Mazandaran =

Meydanak میدانک
- Village
- Location within Iran
- Coordinates: 36°18′12″N 53°14′26″E
- Country: Iran
- Province: Mazandaran
- County: Sari
- Bakhsh: Kolijan Rostaq
- Rural District: Tangeh Soleyman

Population (2016)
  - Total: 113
- Time zone: UTC+3:30 (IRST)

Meydanak (Persian: میدانک, also Romanized as Meydānak) is a village in Tangeh Soleyman Rural District, Kolijan Rostaq District, Sari County, Mazandaran Province, Iran. At the 2016 census, its population was 113, in 45 families.
