= Dozdak, Sari =

Dozdak دزدک
- Village
- Location within Iran
- Coordinates: 36°26′32″N 53°16′27″E
- Country: Iran
- Province: Mazandaran
- County: Sari
- Bakhsh: Kolijan Rostaq
- Rural District: Kolijan Rostaq-e Olya

Population (2016)
  - Total: 38
- Time zone: UTC+3:30 (IRST)

Dozdak (Persian: دزدک) is a village in Kolijan Rostaq-e Olya Rural District, Kolijan Rostaq District, Sari County, Mazandaran Province, Iran. At the 2016 census, its population was 38, in 15 families. Up from 32 in 2006.
