= Varand, Iran =

Village in Mazandaran province, Iran

Varand Persian: ورند
- Village
- Location within Iran
- Coordinates: 36°21′56″N 53°12′24″E
- Country: Iran
- Province: Mazandaran
- County: Sari
- District: Kolijan Rostaq
- Rural District: Tangeh Soleyman

Population (2016)
  - Total: 158
- Time zone: UTC+3:30 (IRST)

Varand (Persian: ورند) is a village in Tangeh Soleyman Rural District of Kolijan Rostaq District in Sari County, Mazandaran province, Iran.

== Demographics ==
=== Population ===
At the time of the 2006 National Census, the village's population was 219 in 68 households. The following census in 2011 counted 140 people in 57 households. The 2016 census measured the population of the village as 158 people in 68 households.
