= Amreh, Sari =

Village in Mazandaran province, Iran

Amreh Persian: امره
- Village
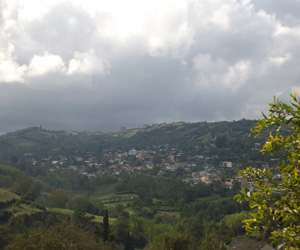
- The village of Amreh

- Location within Iran
- Coordinates: 36°24′42″N 53°07′11″E
- Country: Iran
- Province: Mazandaran
- County: Sari
- District: Kolijan Rostaq
- Rural District: Kolijan Rostaq-e Olya

Population (2016)
  - Total: 2,206
- Time zone: UTC+3:30 (IRST)

Amreh (Persian: امره) (Note: Also known as Amrī) is a village in Kolijan Rostaq-e Olya Rural District of Kolijan Rostaq District in Sari County, Mazandaran province, Iran.

== Demographics ==
=== Population ===
At the time of the 2006 National Census, the village's population was 2,408 in 674 households. The following census in 2011 counted 2,329 people in 749 households. The 2016 census measured the population of the village as 2,206 people in 803 households, the most populous in its rural district.

== See also ==
Media related to Amreh, Sari at Wikimedia Commons
