= Afrachal, Sari =

Afrachal افراچال
- Village
- Location within Iran
- Coordinates: 36°14′11″N 53°14′29″E
- Country: Iran
- Province: Mazandaran
- County: Sari
- Bakhsh: Kolijan Rostaq
- Rural District: Tangeh Soleyman
- Elevation: 600 m (2,000 ft)

Population (2006)
  - Total: 36
- Time zone: UTC+3:30 (IRST)
- Website: @afrachal

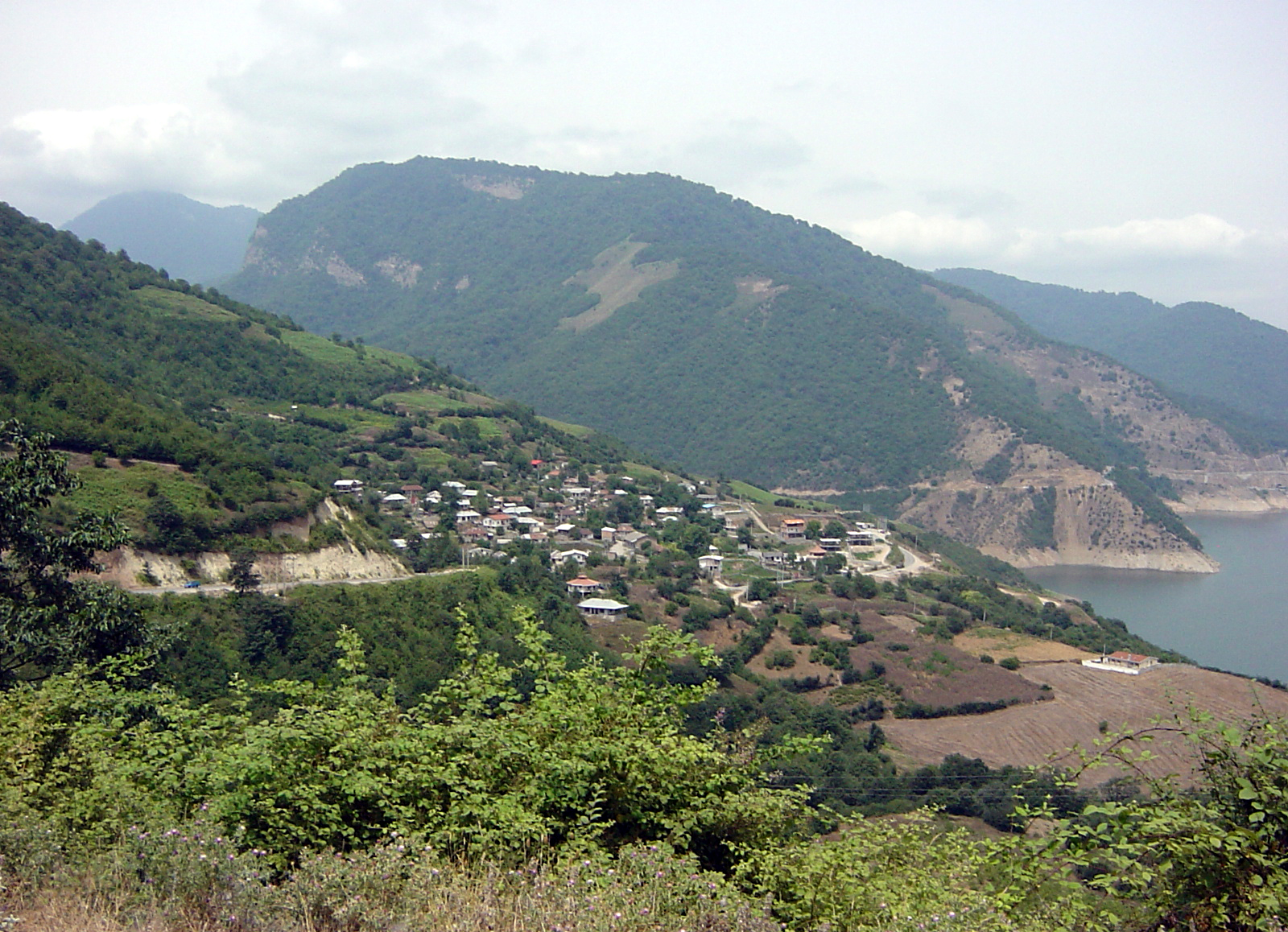
Mazandaran - Soleyman Tangeh - Afrachal

Afrachal (Persian: افراچال, also Romanized as Afrāchāl) is a village in Tangeh Soleyman Rural District, Kolijan Rostaq District, Sari County, Mazandaran province, Iran. At the 2016 census, its population was 34, in 14 families.
