= Kal Quchal =

Kal Quchal كلقوچال
- Village
- Location within Iran
- Coordinates: 36°26′28″N 53°15′22″E
- Country: Iran
- Province: Mazandaran
- County: Sari
- Bakhsh: Kolijan Rostaq
- Rural District: Kolijan Rostaq-e Olya

Population (2016)
  - Total: 62
- Time zone: UTC+3:30 (IRST)

Kal Quchal (Persian: كلقوچال, also Romanized as Kal Qūchāl) is a village in Kolijan Rostaq-e Olya Rural District, Kolijan Rostaq District, Sari County, Mazandaran Province, Iran. At the 2006 census, its population was 62, in 23 families. Up from 58 in 2006.
