= Ahmadabad, Mazandaran =

Ahmadabad احمدآباد
- Village
- Location within Iran
- Coordinates: 36°26′33″N 53°17′33″E
- Country: Iran
- Province: Mazandaran
- County: Sari
- Bakhsh: Kolijan Rostaq
- Rural District: Kolijan Rostaq-e Olya

Population (2016)
  - Total: 20
- Time zone: UTC+3:30 (IRST)

Ahmadabad (Persian: احمدآباد, also Romanized as Aḩmadābād) is a village in Kolijan Rostaq-e Olya Rural District, Kolijan Rostaq District, Sari County, Mazandaran Province, Iran. At the 2016 census, its population was 20, in 10 families. Down from 37 people in 2006.
