= Aq Mashhad =

Village in Mazandaran province, Iran

Aq Mashhad Persian: آق مشهد
- Village
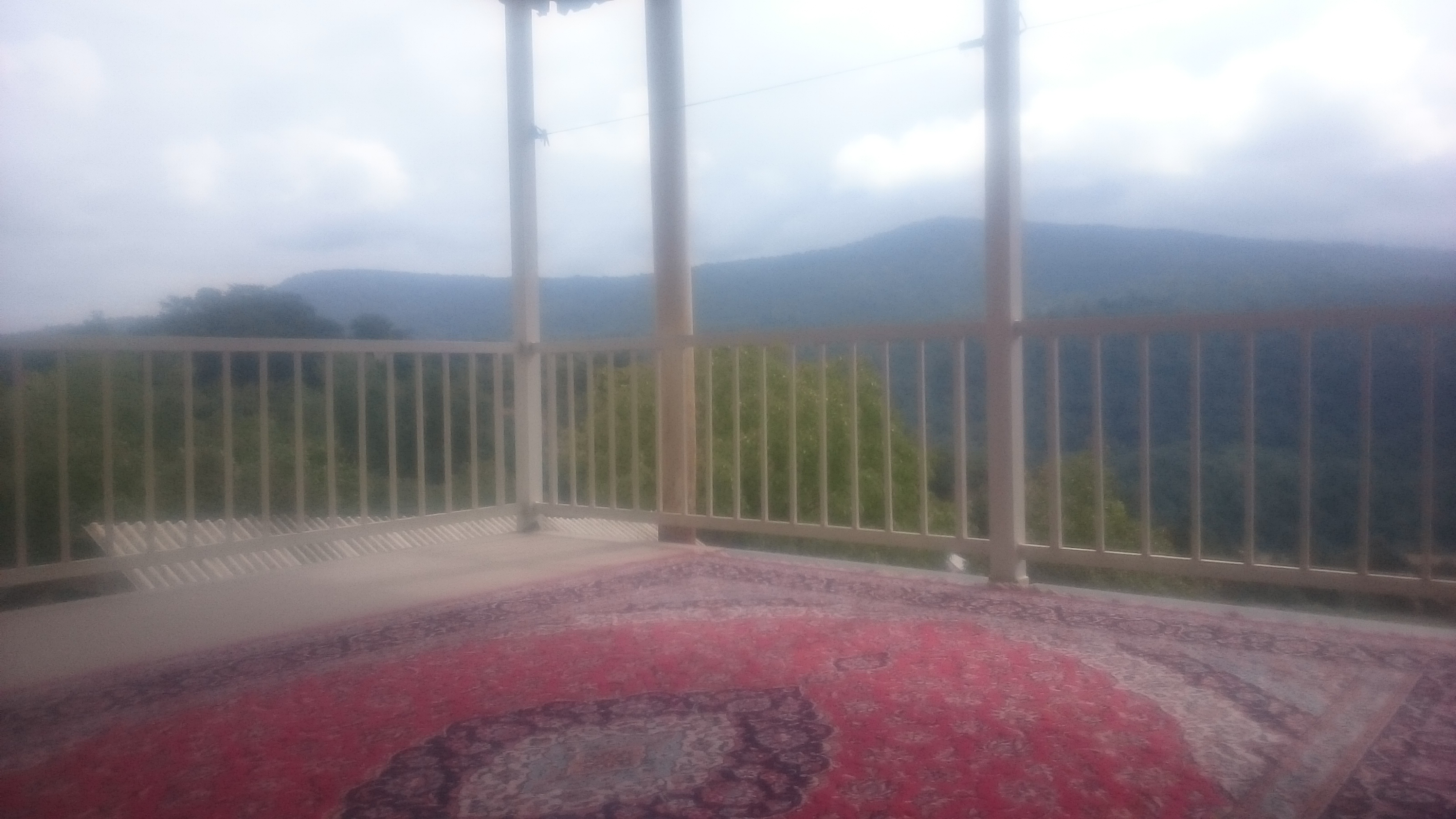
- Landscape around the village of Aq Mashhad

- Location within Iran
- Coordinates: 36°21′N 53°08′E
- Country: Iran
- Province: Mazandaran
- County: Sari
- District: Kolijan Rostaq
- Rural District: Tangeh Soleyman

Population (2016)
  - Total: 177
- Time zone: UTC+3:30 (IRST)

Aq Mashhad (Persian: آق مشهد) (Note: Also romanized as Āq Mashhad; also known as Āqā Mashhad) is a village in Tangeh Soleyman Rural District of Kolijan Rostaq District in Sari County, Mazandaran province, Iran.

== Demographics ==
=== Population ===
At the time of the 2006 National Census, the village's population was 193 in 73 households. The following census in 2011 counted 125 people in 51 households. The 2016 census measured the population of the village as 177 people in 70 households.
