= Ahu Dasht, Sari =

Village in Mazandaran, Iran

Ahu Dasht آهودشت
- Village
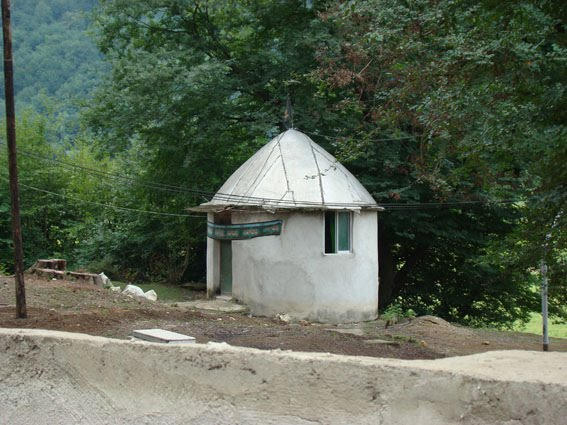

- Location within Iran
- Coordinates: 36°26′11″N 53°10′20″E
- Country: Iran
- Province: Mazandaran
- County: Sari
- Bakhsh: Kolijan Rostaq
- Rural District: Kolijan Rostaq-e Olya
- Elevation: 200 m (660 ft)

Population (2016)
  - Total: 212
- Time zone: UTC+3:30 (IRST)

Ahu Dasht (Persian: آهو دشت, also Romanized as Āhū Dasht) is a village in Kolijan Rostaq-e Olya Rural District, Kolijan Rostaq District, Sari County, Mazandaran Province, Iran. At the 2016 census, its population was 212, in 75 families. Up from 197 in 2006.
