= Ajarostaq =

Village in Mazandaran province, Iran

Ajarostaq Persian: اجارستاق
- Village
- Location within Iran
- Coordinates: 36°17′56″N 53°13′46″E
- Country: Iran
- Province: Mazandaran
- County: Sari
- District: Kolijan Rostaq
- Rural District: Tangeh Soleyman

Population (2016)
  - Total: 226
- Time zone: UTC+3:30 (IRST)

Ajarostaq (Persian: اجارستاق) (Note: Also romanized as Ajārostāq; also known as Ajārestān) is a village in Tangeh Soleyman Rural District of Kolijan Rostaq District in Sari County, Mazandaran province, Iran.

== Demographics ==
=== Population ===
At the time of the 2006 National Census, the village's population was 314 in 93 households. The following census in 2011 counted 249 people in 85 households. The 2016 census measured the population of the village as 226 people in 87 households, the most populous in its rural district.
