= Lowlet =

Lowlet لولت
- Village
- Location within Iran
- Coordinates: 36°16′40″N 53°11′41″E
- Country: Iran
- Province: Mazandaran
- County: Sari
- Bakhsh: Kolijan Rostaq
- Rural District: Tangeh Soleyman

Population (2016)
  - Total: 52
- Time zone: UTC+3:30 (IRST)

Lowlet (Persian: لولت; also known as Lolet and Lūt) is a village in Tangeh Soleyman Rural District, Kolijan Rostaq District, Sari County, Mazandaran Province, Iran. At the 2016 census, its population was 52, in 24 families. Down from 77 people in 2006.
