= Darvar, Mazandaran =

Village in Mazandaran province, Iran

Darvar Persian: دروار
- Village
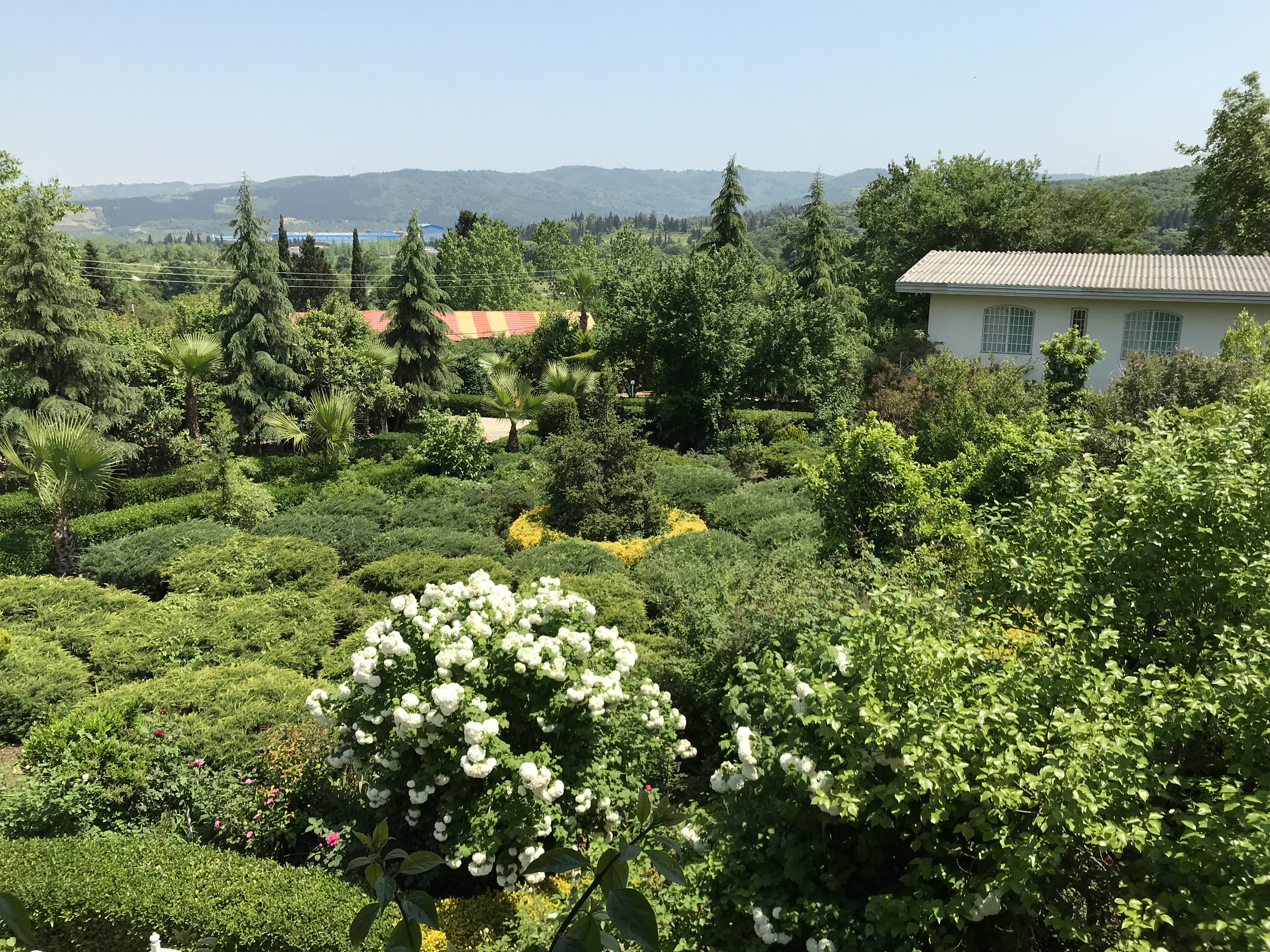
- The village of Darvar

- Location within Iran
- Coordinates: 36°26′40″N 53°04′50″E
- Country: Iran
- Province: Mazandaran
- County: Sari
- District: Kolijan Rostaq
- Rural District: Kolijan Rostaq-e Olya

Population (2016)
  - Total: 229
- Time zone: UTC+3:30 (IRST)

Darvar (Persian: دروار) (Note: Also romanized as Darvār and Darwār) is a village in Kolijan Rostaq-e Olya Rural District of Kolijan Rostaq District in Sari County, Mazandaran province, Iran.

== Demographics ==
=== Population ===
At the time of the 2006 National Census, the village's population was 192 in 51 households. The following census in 2011 counted 218 people in 59 households. The 2016 census measured the population of the village as 229 people in 72 households.
