= Tangeh Soleyman Rural District =

Rural district in Mazandaran province, Iran

Tangeh Soleyman Rural District Persian: دهستان تنگه سليمان
- Rural District
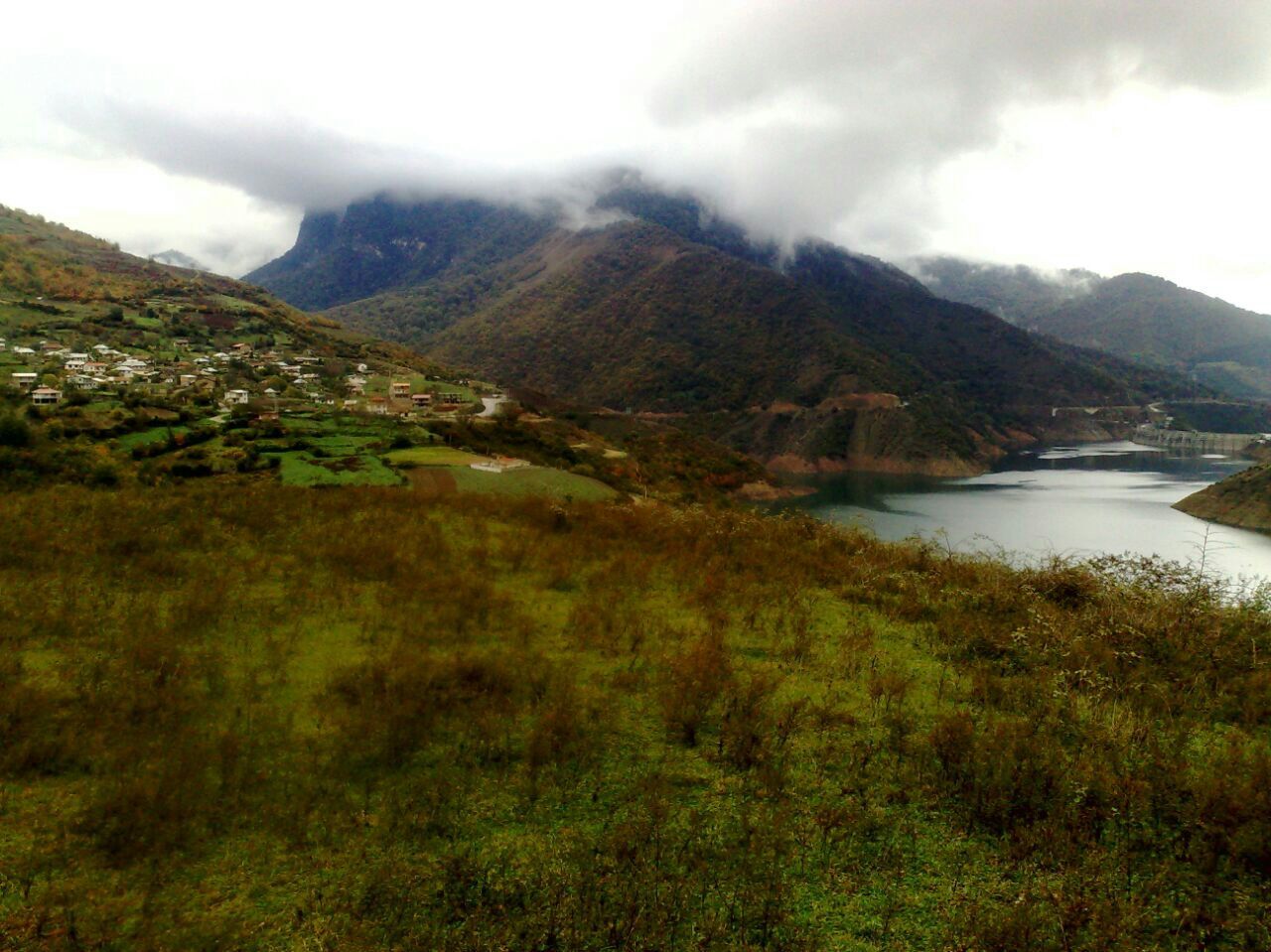
- Soleyman Tangeh (Shahid Rajaei) dam in Tangeh Soleyman Rural District

- Location within Iran
- Coordinates: 36°20′N 53°11′E
- Country: Iran
- Province: Mazandaran
- County: Sari
- District: Kolijan Rostaq
- Established: 2003
- Capital: Rig Cheshmeh

Population (2016)
  - Total: 2,607
- Time zone: UTC+3:30 (IRST)

Tangeh Soleyman Rural District (Persian: دهستان تنگه سليمان) is in Kolijan Rostaq District of Sari County, Mazandaran province, Iran. Its capital is the village of Rig Cheshmeh.

== Demographics ==
=== Population ===
At the time of the 2006 National Census, the rural district's population was 3,600 in 1,164 households. There were 2,549 inhabitants in 955 households at the following census of 2011. The 2016 census measured the population of the rural district as 2,607 in 1,008 households. The most populous of its 26 villages was Ajarostaq, with 226 people.

=== Other villages in the rural district ===
- Aboksar
- Afrachal
- Alamdar Deh
- Aq Mashhad
- Aq Mashhad-e Kamar Kheyl
- Chachkam
- Gardeshi
- Golurd
- Kola Kheyl
- Larema
- Lowlet
- Meydanak
- Naqib Deh
- Now Deh
- Palesk
- Parvarijabad
- Rudbar-e Naqib Deh
- Takam
- Varaki
- Varand
- Vastan
- Yademan

== Soleyman Tangeh Dam ==
Shahid Rajai Reservoir Dam, known as "Soleyman Tangeh Dam", is in this rural district near the village of Afrachal on the Tajen river. It was constructed in 1996 with the aim of providing agricultural water to the capital of Mazandaran province and neighboring cities and controlling floods. The dam's reservoir volume is 162 m3. It has overflowed seven times since it was commissioned in 1996.
