= Pahneh Kola-ye Shomali =

Village in Mazandaran province, Iran

Pahneh Kola-ye Shomali Persian: پهنه كلاشمالي
- Village
- Location within Iran
- Coordinates: 36°27′24″N 53°04′27″E
- Country: Iran
- Province: Mazandaran
- County: Sari
- District: Kolijan Rostaq
- Rural District: Kolijan Rostaq-e Olya

Population (2016)
  - Total: 1,122
- Time zone: UTC+3:30 (IRST)

Pahneh Kola-ye Shomali (Persian: پهنه كلاشمالي) (Note: Also romanized as Pahneh Kolā-ye Shomālī; also known as Pahneh Kalā, Pahneh Kolā, and Puna Qal‘eh) is a village in Kolijan Rostaq-e Olya Rural District of Kolijan Rostaq District in Sari County, Mazandaran province, Iran.

== Demographics ==
=== Population ===
At the time of the 2006 National Census, the village's population was 1,203 in 291 households. The following census in 2011 counted 1,138 people in 325 households. The 2016 census measured the population of the village as 1,122 people in 352 households.
