= Aboksar, Kolijan Rostaq =

Aboksar آبکسر
- Village
- Location within Iran
- Coordinates: 36°15′53″N 53°17′16″E
- Country: Iran
- Province: Mazandaran
- County: Sari
- Bakhsh: Kolijan Rostaq
- Rural District: Tangeh Soleyman

Population (2016)
  - Total: 63
- Time zone: UTC+3:30 (IRST)

Aboksar (Persian: آبکسر, also Romanized as Āboksar) is a village in Tangeh Soleyman Rural District, Kolijan Rostaq District, Sari County, Mazandaran Province, Iran. At the 2016 census, its population was 63, in 22 families. Decreased from 120 people in 2006.
