= Alavi Kola, Sari =

Village in Mazandaran province, Iran

Alavi Kola Persian: علويكلا
- Village
- Location within Iran
- Coordinates: 36°26′04″N 53°08′53″E
- Country: Iran
- Province: Mazandaran
- County: Sari
- District: Kolijan Rostaq
- Rural District: Kolijan Rostaq-e Olya

Population (2016)
  - Total: 266
- Time zone: UTC+3:30 (IRST)

Alavi Kola (Persian: علويكلا) (Note: Also romanized as ‘Alavī Kolā) is a village in Kolijan Rostaq-e Olya Rural District of Kolijan Rostaq District in Sari County, Mazandaran province, Iran.

== Demographics ==
=== Population ===
At the time of the 2006 National Census, the village's population was 238 in 63 households. The following census in 2011 counted 249 people in 82 households. The 2016 census measured the population of the village as 266 people in 90 households.
