= Pahneh Kola-ye Jonubi =

Village in Mazandaran province, Iran

Pahneh Kola-ye Jonubi Persian: پهنه كلا جنوبي
- Village
- Location within Iran
- Coordinates: 36°27′03″N 53°04′39″E
- Country: Iran
- Province: Mazandaran
- County: Sari
- District: Kolijan Rostaq
- Rural District: Kolijan Rostaq-e Olya

Population (2016)
  - Total: 516
- Time zone: UTC+3:30 (IRST)

Pahneh Kola-ye Jonubi (Persian: پهنه كلا جنوبي) (Note: Also romanized as Pahneh Kolā-ye Jonūbī) is a village in Kolijan Rostaq-e Olya Rural District of Kolijan Rostaq District in Sari County, Mazandaran province, Iran.

== Demographics ==
=== Population ===
At the time of the 2006 National Census, the village's population was 446 in 119 households. The following census in 2011 counted 535 people in 145 households. The 2016 census measured the population of the village as 516 people in 168 households.
