= Hular-e Olya =

Hular-e Olya هولار عليا
- Village
- Location within Iran
- Coordinates: 36°25′38″N 53°07′31″E
- Country: Iran
- Province: Mazandaran
- County: Sari
- Bakhsh: Kolijan Rostaq
- Rural District: Kolijan Rostaq-e Olya

Population (2016)
  - Total: 151
- Time zone: UTC+3:30 (IRST)

Hular-e Olya (Persian: هولار عليا, also Romanized as Hūlār-e ‘Olyā; also known as Bālā Hūlār and Hūlār-e Bālā) is a village in Kolijan Rostaq-e Olya Rural District, Kolijan Rostaq District, Sari County, Mazandaran Province, Iran. At the 2016 census, its population was 151, in 65 families.
