= Pain Hular =

City in Mazandaran province, Iran

Pain Hular Persian: پايين هولار
- City
- Location within Iran
- Coordinates: 36°25′40″N 53°08′10″E
- Country: Iran
- Province: Mazandaran
- County: Sari
- District: Kolijan Rostaq
- Established as a city: 2011

Population (2016)
  - Total: 956
- Time zone: UTC+3:30 (IRST)

Pain Hular (Persian: پايين هولار) (Note: Also romanized as Pā’īn Hūlār; also known as Hūlār-e Pā’īn) is a city in, and the capital of, Kolijan Rostaq District in Sari County, Mazandaran province, Iran. It also serves as the administrative center for Kolijan Rostaq-e Olya Rural District.

At the time of the 2006 National Census, Pain Hular's population was 479 in 121 households, when it was a village in Kolijan Rostaq-e Olya Rural District. The following census in 2011 counted 626 people in 195 households. The 2016 census measured the population as 956 people in 332 households, by which time the village of Pain Hular had been converted to a city.
