= Darvar-e Fartaq =

Darvar-e Fartaq دروارفارتق
- Village
- Location within Iran
- Coordinates: 31°16′24″N 50°26′03″E
- Country: Iran
- Province: Kohgiluyeh and Boyer-Ahmad
- County: Kohgiluyeh
- Bakhsh: Dishmok
- Rural District: Bahmayi-ye Sarhadi-ye Sharqi

Population (2006)
  - Total: 255
- Time zone: UTC+3:30 (IRST)
  - Summer (DST): UTC+4:30 (IRDT)

Darvar-e Fartaq (Persian: دروارفارتق, also Romanized as Darvār-e Fārtaq; also known as Darvār) is a village in Bahmayi-ye Sarhadi-ye Sharqi Rural District, Dishmok District, Kohgiluyeh County, Kohgiluyeh and Boyer-Ahmad Province, Iran. At the 2006 census, its population was 255, in 45 families.
