= Kolijan Rostaq-e Olya Rural District =

Rural district in Mazandaran province, Iran

Kolijan Rostaq-e Olya Rural District Persian: دهستان كليجان رستاق عليا
- Rural District
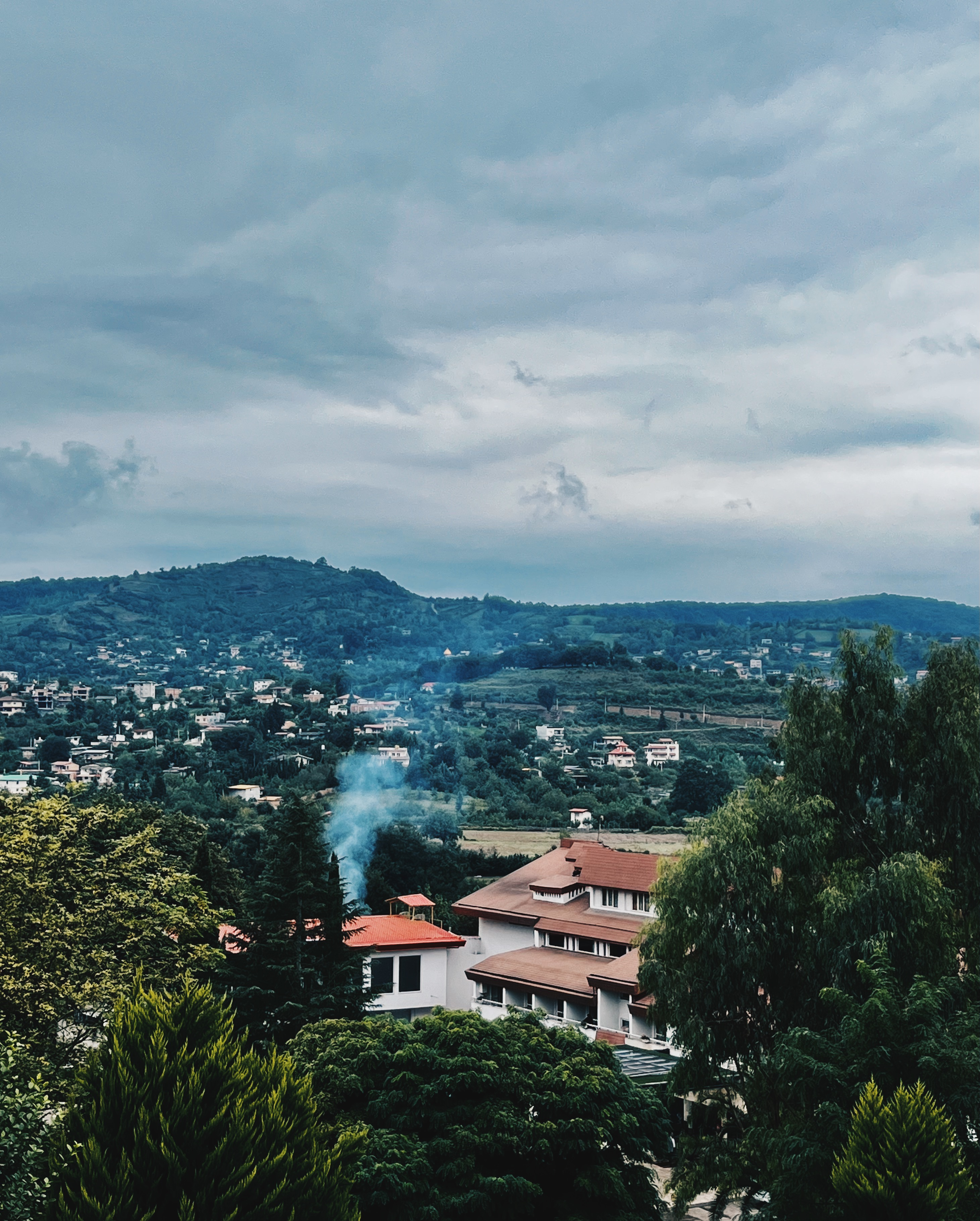

- Location within Iran
- Coordinates: 36°25′N 53°10′E
- Country: Iran
- Province: Mazandaran
- County: Sari
- District: Kolijan Rostaq
- Established: 1987
- Capital: Pain Hular

Population (2016)
  - Total: 8,461
- Time zone: UTC+3:30 (IRST)

Kolijan Rostaq-e Olya Rural District (Persian: دهستان كليجان رستاق عليا) is in Kolijan Rostaq District of Sari County, Mazandaran province, Iran. It is administered from the city of Pain Hular.

== Demographics ==
=== Population ===
At the time of the 2006 National Census, the rural district's population was 9,543 in 2,643 households. There were 9,183 inhabitants in 2,877 households at the following census of 2011. The 2016 census measured the population of the rural district as 8,461 in 2,955 households. The most populous of its 28 villages was Amreh, with 2,206 people.

=== Other villages in the rural district ===
- Ahmadabad
- Ahu Dasht
- Alavi Kola
- Amreh
- Arzefun
- Bala Kula
- Dalak Kheyl
- Darupey
- Darvar
- Dozdak
- Garm Rud
- Garmestan
- Hular-e Olya
- Kal Quchal
- Mashown Kola
- Pahneh Kola-ye Jonubi
- Pahneh Kola-ye Shomali
- Rudbar Kola
- Salim Bahram
- Salim Sheykh
- Sang Bon
- Saqandin Kola
- Sar Kat
- Shab Kola
- Shekta
