= Kolijan Rostaq District =

District in Mazandaran province, Iran

Kolijan Rostaq District Persian: بخش کلیجان‌ رستاق
- District
- Location within Iran
- Coordinates: 36°21′N 53°11′E
- Country: Iran
- Province: Mazandaran
- County: Sari
- Established: 2003
- Capital: Pain Hular

Population (2016)
  - Total: 12,024
- Time zone: UTC+3:30 (IRST)

Kolijan Rostaq District (Persian: بخش کلیجان‌ رستاق) is in Sari County, Mazandaran province, Iran. Its capital is the city of Pain Hular.

== Demographics ==
=== Population ===
At the time of the 2006 National Census, the district's population was 13,143 in 3,807 households. The following census in 2011 counted 11,732 people in 3,832 households. The 2016 census measured the population of the district as 12,024 inhabitants in 4,925 households.

=== Administrative divisions ===
Kolijan Rostaq District Population
Administrative Divisions	2006	2011	2016
Kolijan Rostaq-e Olya RD	9,543	9,183	8,461
Tangeh Soleyman RD	3,600	2,549	2,607
Pain Hular (city)			956
Total	13,143	11,732	12,024
RD = Rural District
