= Rudbar (disambiguation) =

Rudbar is a city in Rudbar County, Gilan Province, Iran.

Rudbar or Rud Bar (Persian: رودبر) may also refer to:

== Qazvin Province ==
- Rudbar of Alamut (Rudbar-i Alamut), former name of the Alamut region in Qazvin
- Rudbar-e Alamut District or Alamut-e Sharqi District, Qazvin Province
- Rudbar, Qazvin, Qazvin Province

== Fars Province ==
- Rudbar, Firuzabad, Fars Province
- Rudbar, Sepidan, Fars Province

== Gilan Province ==
- Rudbar-e Deh Sar, in Amlash County
- Rudbar County, in Gilan Province

== Golestan Province ==
- Rudbar, Golestan, Azadshahr County

== Hormozgan Province ==
- Rudbar, Bastak, in Bastak County, Hormozgan Province
- Rudbar, Khamir, in Khamir County, Hormozgan Province

== Isfahan Province ==
- Rudbar, Isfahan, in Semirom County

== Kerman Province ==
- Rudbar, Kerman
- Rudbar, Rabor, in Rabor County, Kerman Province
- Rudbar-e Jonubi County, in Kerman Province

== Mazandaran Province ==
- Rudbar, Mazandaran, Amol County
- Rudbar, Behshahr, also known as Rudbar-e Yakhkesh, Behshahr county
- Rudbar-e Edru, in Sari County
- Rud Bar-e Firuz Ja, Babol County
- Rudbar-e Kharkhun, Sari County
- Rudbar Kola, Sari County
- Rudbar-e Naqib Deh, Sari County
- Rudbar-e Telma Darreh, Sari County
- Rud Bar-e Later Gaz, known as Later Gaz-e Sofla, Neka County

== Tehran Province ==
- Rudbar-e Qasran District, Shemiranat County

== Semnan Province ==
- Rudbar, Semnan, Mehdishahr County
- Rudbarak-e Bala, Mehdishahr County
- Rudbarak-e Pain, Mehdishahr County

== See also ==
- Rudbar Rural District (disambiguation)
- Rudsar, Gilan Province
- Rudsar County, in Gilan Province
- Rudbar-e Aligudarz river, branch of Dez river.
