= Marg Sar, Semnan =

Village in Semnan province, Iran

Marg Sar Persian: مرگسر
- Village
- Location within Iran
- Coordinates: 35°46′18″N 53°09′28″E
- Country: Iran
- Province: Semnan
- County: Mehdishahr
- District: Central
- Rural District: Darjazin

Population (2016)
  - Total: 43
- Time zone: UTC+3:30 (IRST)

Marg Sar (Persian: مرگسر) (Note: Also romanized as Marg-e Sar) is a village in Darjazin Rural District of the Central District in Mehdishahr County, Semnan province, Iran.

== Demographics ==
=== Population ===
The village did not appear in the 2006 National Census, when it was in Chashm Rural District of the former Mehdishahr District in Semnan County. The village again did not appear in the following census of 2011, by which time the district had been separated from the county in the establishment of Mehdishahr County. The rural district was transferred to the new Shahmirzad District, and Marg Sar was transferred to Darjazin Rural District created in the new Central District. The 2016 census measured the population of the village as 43 people in 21 households.
