= Darband, Semnan =

Village in Semnan province, Iran

Darband Persian: دربند
- Village
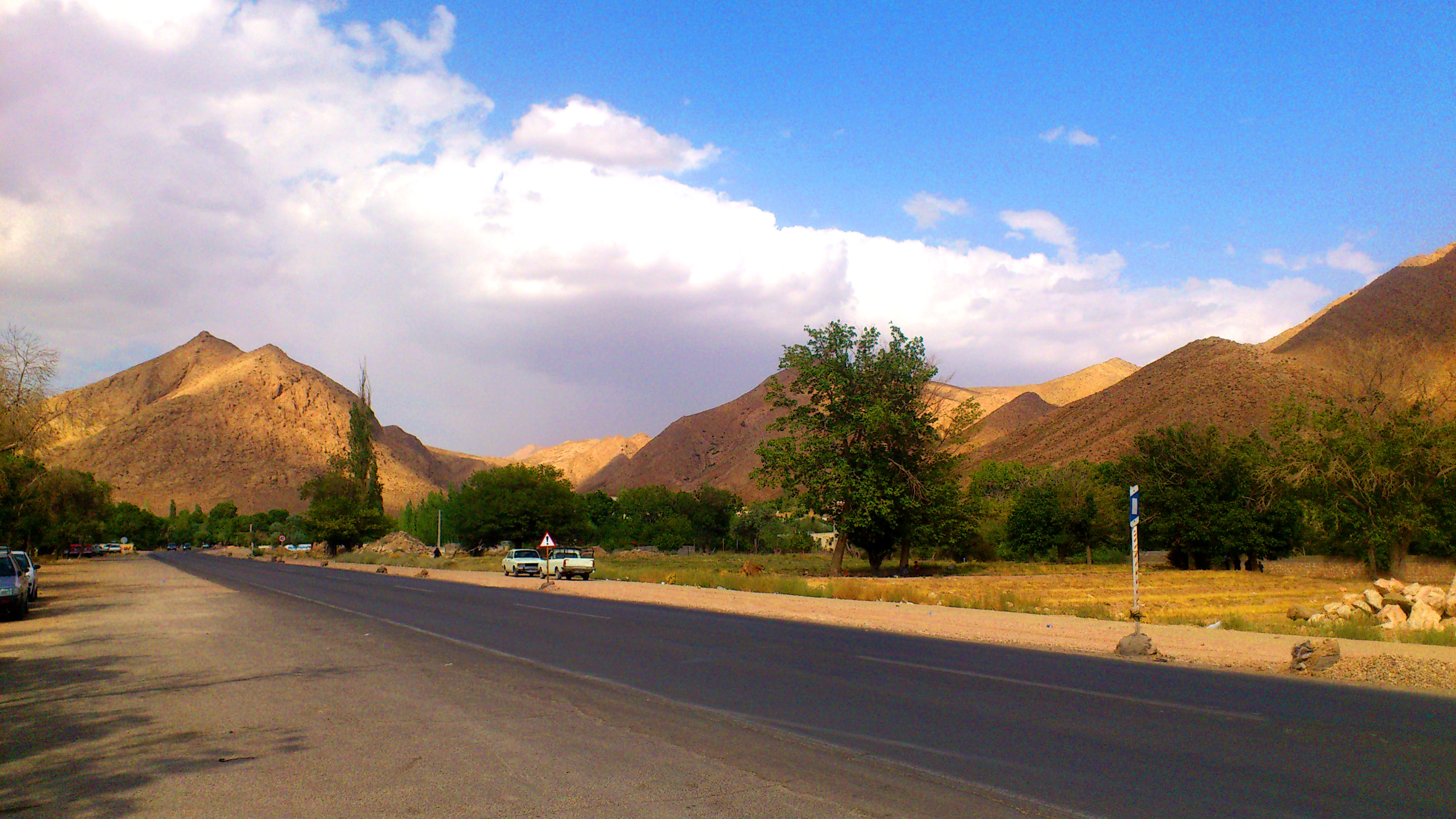
- Darband in 2012

- Location within Iran
- Coordinates: 35°44′49″N 53°22′00″E
- Country: Iran
- Province: Semnan
- County: Mehdishahr
- District: Central
- Rural District: Darjazin

Population (2016)
  - Total: 76
- Time zone: UTC+3:30 (IRST)

Darband (Persian: دربند) is a village in Darjazin Rural District of the Central District in Mehdishahr County, Semnan province, Iran.

== Demographics ==
=== Population ===
At the time of the 2006 National Census, the village's population was 20 in four households, when it was in Chashm Rural District of the former Mehdishahr District in Semnan County. The village did not appear in the following census of 2011, by which time the district had been separated from the county in the establishment of Mehdishahr County. The rural district was transferred to the new Shahmirzad District, and Darband was transferred to Darjazin Rural District created in the new Central District. The 2016 census measured the population of the village as 76 people in 28 households, the most populous in its rural district.
