= Emamzadeh Zeynali =

Village in Semnan province, Iran

Emamzadeh Zeynali Persian: امامزاده زينعلي
- Village
- Location within Iran
- Coordinates: 35°40′39″N 53°16′15″E
- Country: Iran
- Province: Semnan
- County: Mehdishahr
- District: Central
- Rural District: Darjazin

Population (2016)
  - Total: 30
- Time zone: UTC+3:30 (IRST)

Emamzadeh Zeynali (Persian: امامزاده زينعلي) (Note: Also romanized as Emāmzādeh Zeyn‘alī) is a village in Darjazin Rural District of the Central District in Mehdishahr County, Semnan province, Iran.

== Demographics ==
=== Population ===
The village did not appear in the 2006 National Census, when it was in Chashm Rural District of the former Mehdishahr District in Semnan County. The following census in 2011 counted 36 people in six households, by which time the district had been separated from the county in the establishment of Mehdishahr County. The rural district was transferred to the new Shahmirzad District, and Emamzadeh Zeynali was transferred to Darjazin Rural District created in the new Central District. The 2016 census measured the population of the village as 30 people in 20 households.
