= Rudbarak =

Rudbarak or Rud Barak (Persian: رودبارک) may refer to:

- Rudbarak, Gilan
- Rudbarak, Mazandaran
- Rudbarak, Semnan, formerly Rudbarak-e Bala
- Rudbarak-e Pain, neighbourhood of Rudbarak, Semnan
- Rud Barak, Tehran

== See also ==
- Rudbar (disambiguation)
