= Rasm Rudbar =

Village in Semnan province, Iran

Rasm Rudbar Persian: رسم رودبار
- Village
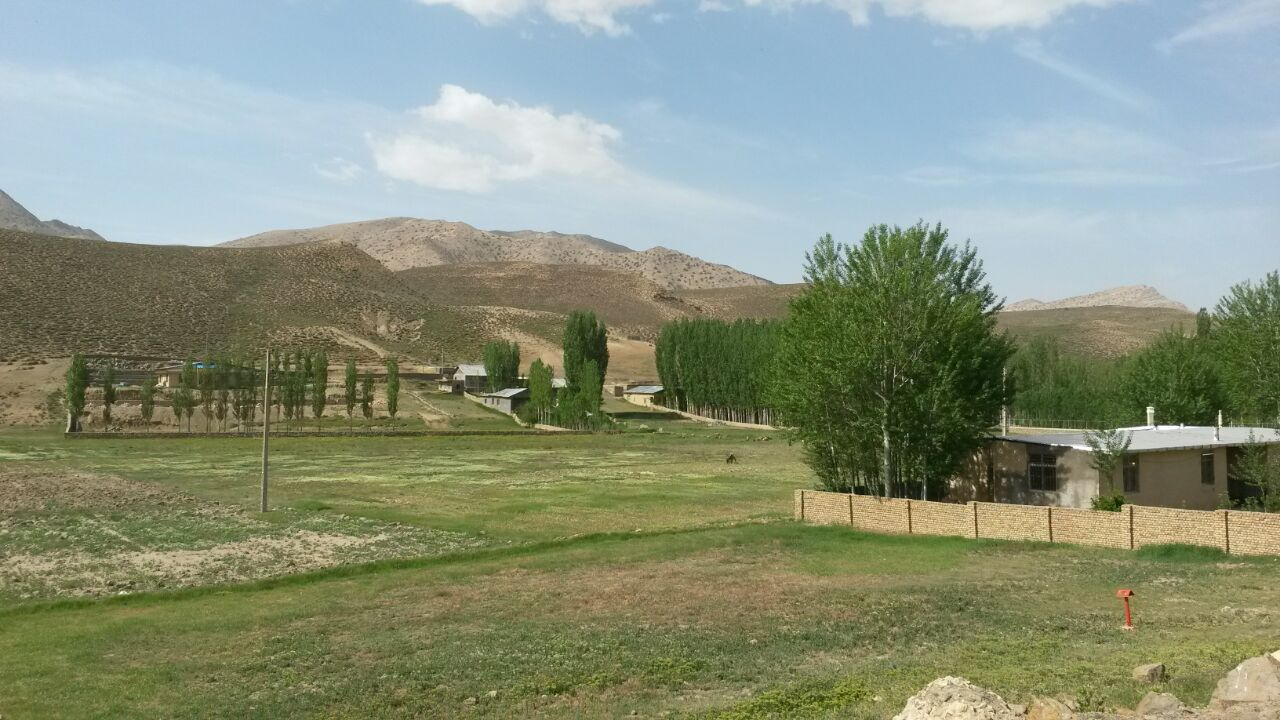

- Location within Iran
- Coordinates: 35.9745°N 53.579°E
- Country: Iran
- Province: Semnan
- County: Mehdishahr
- District: Shahmirzad
- Rural District: Poshtkuh
- Elevation: 2,180 m (7,150 ft)

Population (2016)
  - Total: 21
- Time zone: UTC+3:30 (IRST)

Rasm Rudbar (Persian: رسم رودبار) (Note: Also known as Rasm-e Rudbar) is a village in Poshtkuh Rural District of Shahmirzad District in Mehdishahr County, Semnan province, Iran.

== Demographics ==
=== Population ===
The 2011 census counted 112 people in 28 households, by which time Mehdishahr District had been separated from Semnan County in the establishment of Mehdishahr County. The rural district was transferred to the new Shahmirzad District. The 2016 census measured the population of the village as 21 people in six households.
