= Hamidiyeh, Mehdishahr =

Hamidiyeh حميديه
- Village
- Interactive map of Hamidiyeh
- Coordinates: 35.789°N 53.214°E
- Country: Iran
- Province: Semnan
- County: Mehdishahr
- Bakhsh: Shahmirzad
- Rural District: Chashm

Population (2016)
  - Total: 0
- Time zone: UTC+3:30 (IRST)

Hamidiyeh (Persian: حميديه, also Romanized as Ḩamīdīyeh) is a village in Chashm Rural District, Shahmirzad District, Mehdishahr County, Semnan Province, Iran.

At the time of the 2006 census, the village's population was 17 in 5 households, when it was in the former Mehdishahr District of Semnan County. The following census in 2011 recorded less than 4 households, by which time the district had been separated from the county in the establishment of Mehdishahr County. The rural district was transferred to the new Shahmirzad District. The 2016 census measured a permanent population of zero.
