= Darjazin =

City in Semnan province, Iran

Darjazin Persian: درجزين
- City
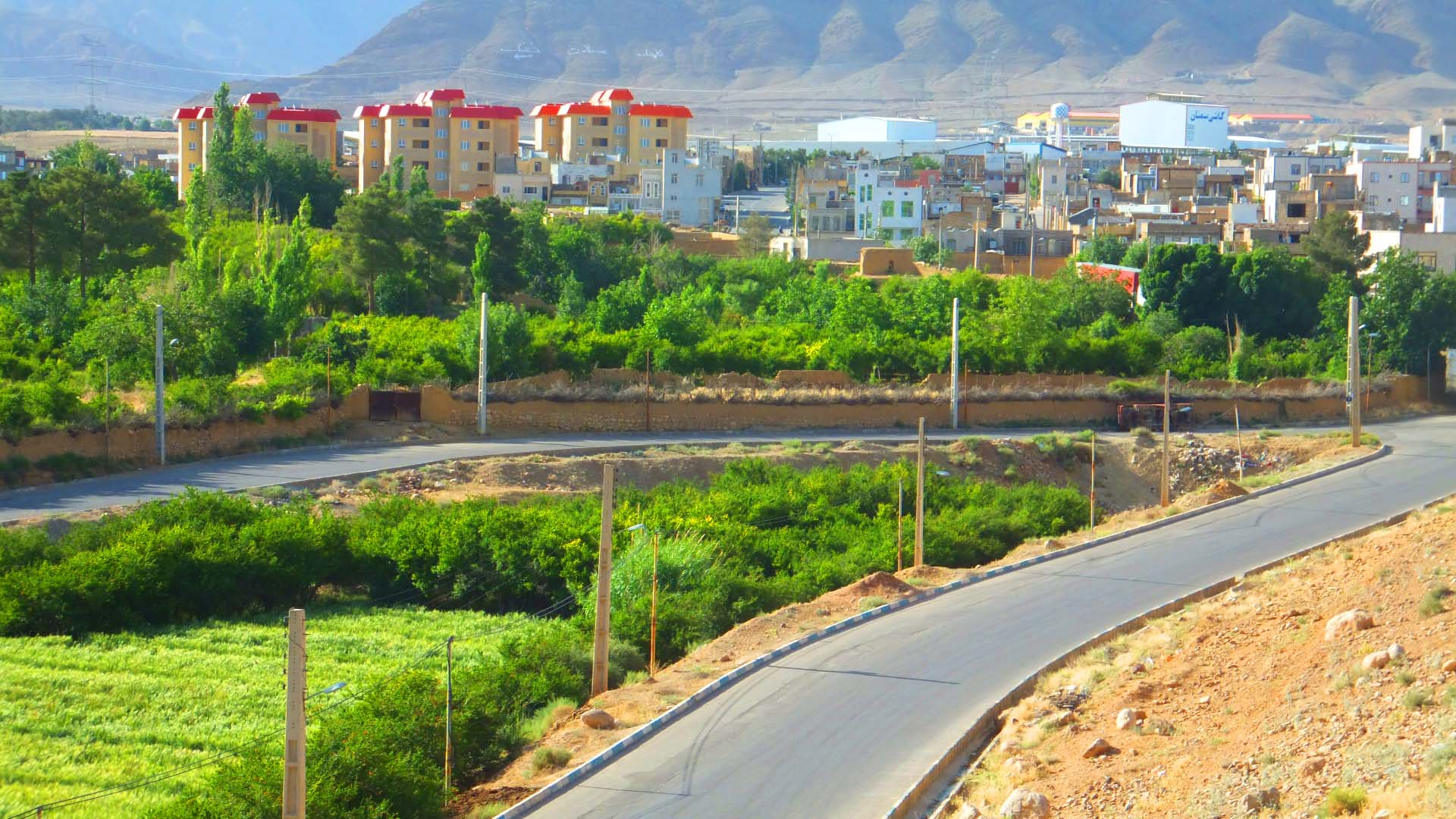

- Location within Iran
- Coordinates: 35°39′18″N 53°20′14″E
- Country: Iran
- Province: Semnan
- County: Mehdishahr
- District: Central

Population (2016)
  - Total: 5,997
- Time zone: UTC+3:30 (IRST)

Darjazin (Persian: درجزين) (Note: Also romanized as Darjazīn; also known as Daragazin and Darzazin) is a city in the Central District of Mehdishahr County, Semnan province, Iran, serving as the administrative center for Darjazin Rural District.

== Demographics ==
=== Population ===
At the time of the 2006 National Census, Darjazin's population was 4,370 in 1,108 households, when it was a village in Chashm Rural District of the former Mehdishahr District in Semnan County. The following census in 2011 counted 4,964 people in 1,359 households, by which time the district had been separated from the county in the establishment of Mehdishahr County. The rural district was transferred to the new Shahmirzad District, and the village was transferred to Darjazin Rural District created in the new Central District. In the same year, Darjazin was converted to a city. The 2016 census measured the population of the city as 5,997 people in 1,777 households.
