= Fulad Mahalleh =

Village in Semnan province, Iran

Fulad Mahalleh Persian: فولادمحله
- Village
- Location within Iran
- Coordinates: 36°03′41″N 53°42′19″E
- Country: Iran
- Province: Semnan
- County: Mehdishahr
- District: Shahmirzad
- Rural District: Poshtkuh

Population (2016)
  - Total: 2,518
- Time zone: UTC+3:30 (IRST)

Fulad Mahalleh (Persian: فولادمحله) (Note: Also romanized as Fūlād Maḩalleh) is a village in, and the capital of, Poshtkuh Rural District in Shahmirzad District of Mehdishahr County, Semnan province, Iran.

== Demographics ==
=== Population ===
At the time of the 2006 National Census, the village's population was 1,344 in 370 households, when it was in the former Mehdishahr District of Semnan County. The following census in 2011 counted 3,910 people in 1,043 households, by which time the district had been separated from the county in the establishment of Mehdishahr County. The rural district was transferred to the new Shahmirzad District. The 2016 census measured the population of the village as 2,518 people in 852 households, the most populous in its rural district.
