= Artat =

Village in Semnan province, Iran

Artat Persian: ارتت
- Village
- Location within Iran
- Coordinates: 35°50′59″N 53°19′04″E
- Country: Iran
- Province: Semnan
- County: Mehdishahr
- District: Shahmirzad
- Rural District: Chashm

Population (2016)
  - Total: 51
- Time zone: UTC+3:30 (IRST)

Artat (Persian: ارتت) (Note: Also romanized as Ārtat and Ertat) is a village in Chashm Rural District of Shahmirzad District in Mehdishahr County, Semnan province, Iran.

== Demographics ==
=== Population ===
At the time of the 2006 census, the village's population was 67 in 15 households, when it was in the former Mehdishahr District of Semnan County. The following census in 2011 counted 86 people in 26 households, by which time the district had been separated from the county in the establishment of Mehdishahr County. The rural district was transferred to the new Shahmirzad District. The 2016 census measured the population of the village as 51 people in 20 households.
