= Deh Sufian =

Village in Semnan province, Iran

Deh Sufian Persian: ده صوفيان
- Village
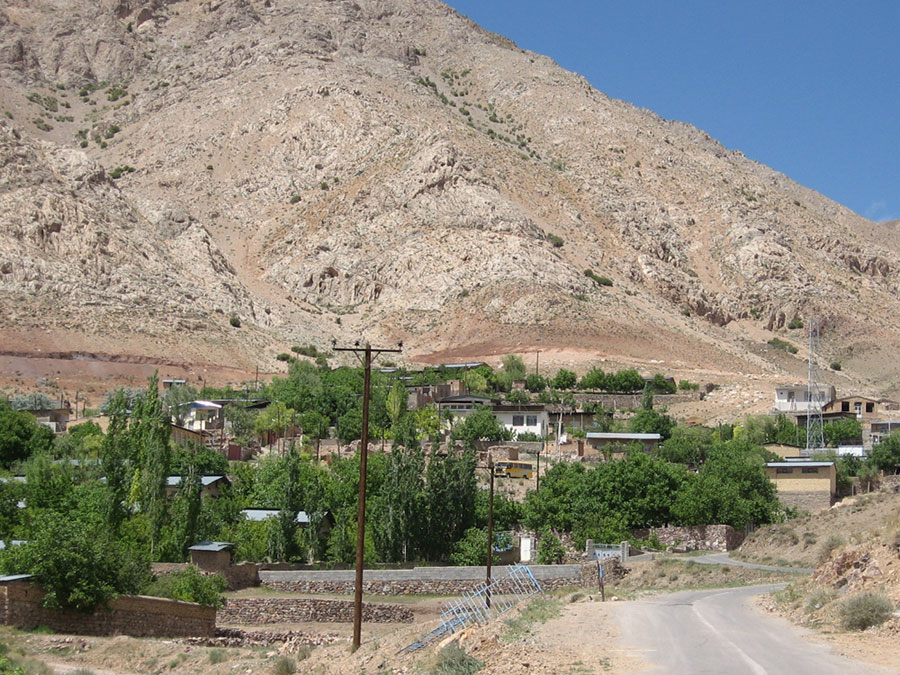
- The village of Deh Sufian

- Location within Iran
- Coordinates: 35°49′05″N 53°23′36″E
- Country: Iran
- Province: Semnan
- County: Mehdishahr
- District: Shahmirzad
- Rural District: Poshtkuh

Population (2016)
  - Total: 104
- Time zone: UTC+3:30 (IRST)

Deh Sufian (Persian: ده صوفيان) (Note: Also romanized as Deh Şūfīān and Deh Sūfīyān) is a village in Poshtkuh Rural District of Shahmirzad District in Mehdishahr County, Semnan province, Iran.

== Demographics ==
=== Population ===
At the time of the 2006 National Census, the village's population was 24 in nine households, when it was in the former Mehdishahr District of Semnan County. The following census in 2011 counted 72 people in 26 households, by which time the district had been separated from the county in the establishment of Mehdishahr County. The rural district was transferred to the new Shahmirzad District. The 2016 census measured the population of the village as 104 people in 41 households.
