= Chashm =

Village in Semnan province, Iran

Chashm Persian: چاشم
- Village
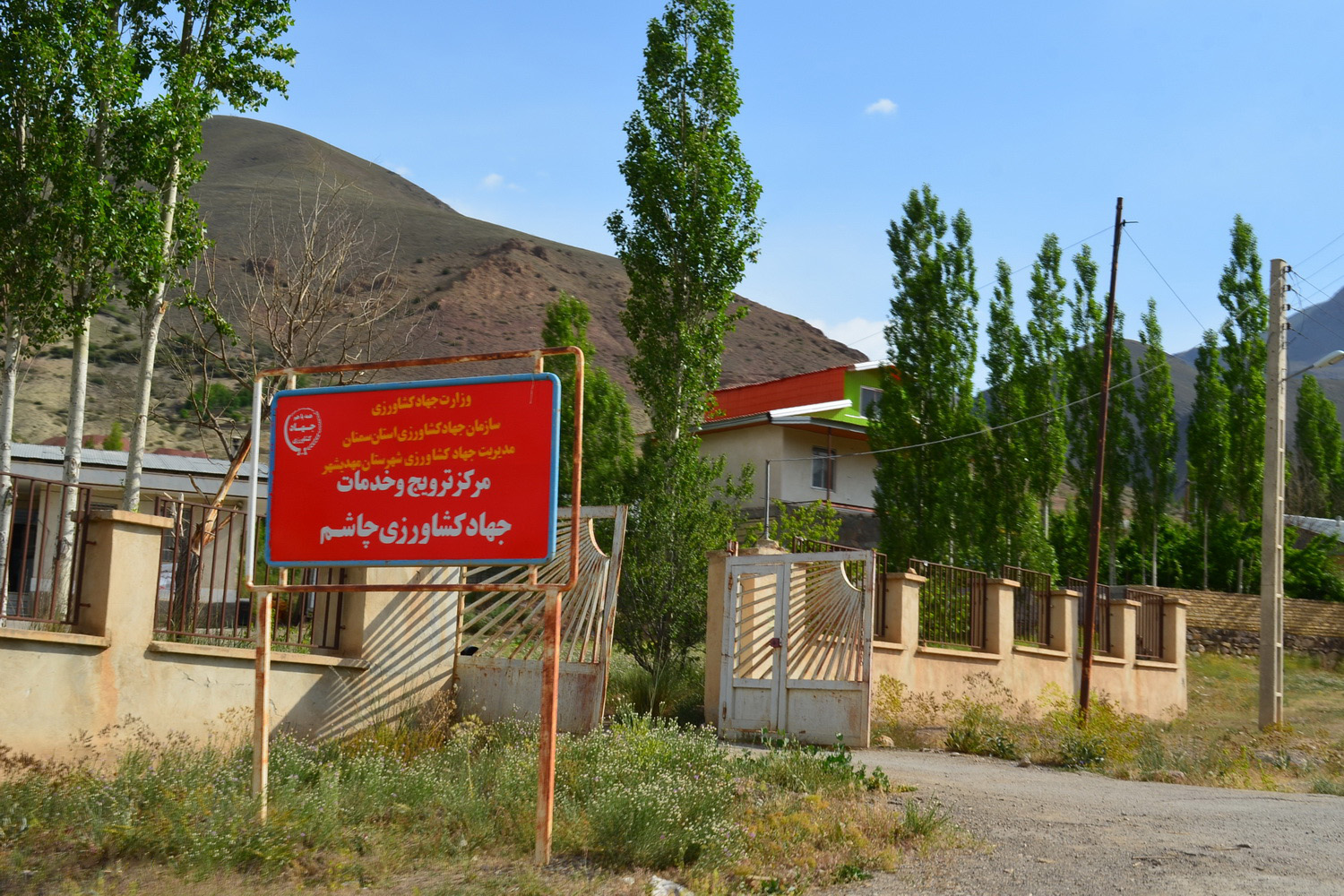
- The village of Chashm

- Location within Iran
- Coordinates: 35°53′47″N 53°15′29″E
- Country: Iran
- Province: Semnan
- County: Mehdishahr
- District: Shahmirzad
- Rural District: Chashm

Population (2016)
  - Total: 566
- Time zone: UTC+3:30 (IRST)

Chashm (Persian: چاشم) (Note: Also romanized as Chāshm) is a village in, and the capital of, Chashm Rural District in Shahmirzad District of Mehdishahr County, Semnan province, Iran.

== Demographics ==
=== Population ===
At the time of the 2006 census, the village's population was 483 in 126 households, when it was in the former Mehdishahr District of Semnan County. The following census in 2011 counted 725 people in 222 households, by which time the district had been separated from the county in the establishment of Mehdishahr County. The rural district was transferred to the new Shahmirzad District. The 2016 census measured the population of the village as 566 people in 196 households, the most populous in its rural district.
