= Molla Deh =

Village in Semnan province, Iran

Molla Deh Persian: ملاده
- Village
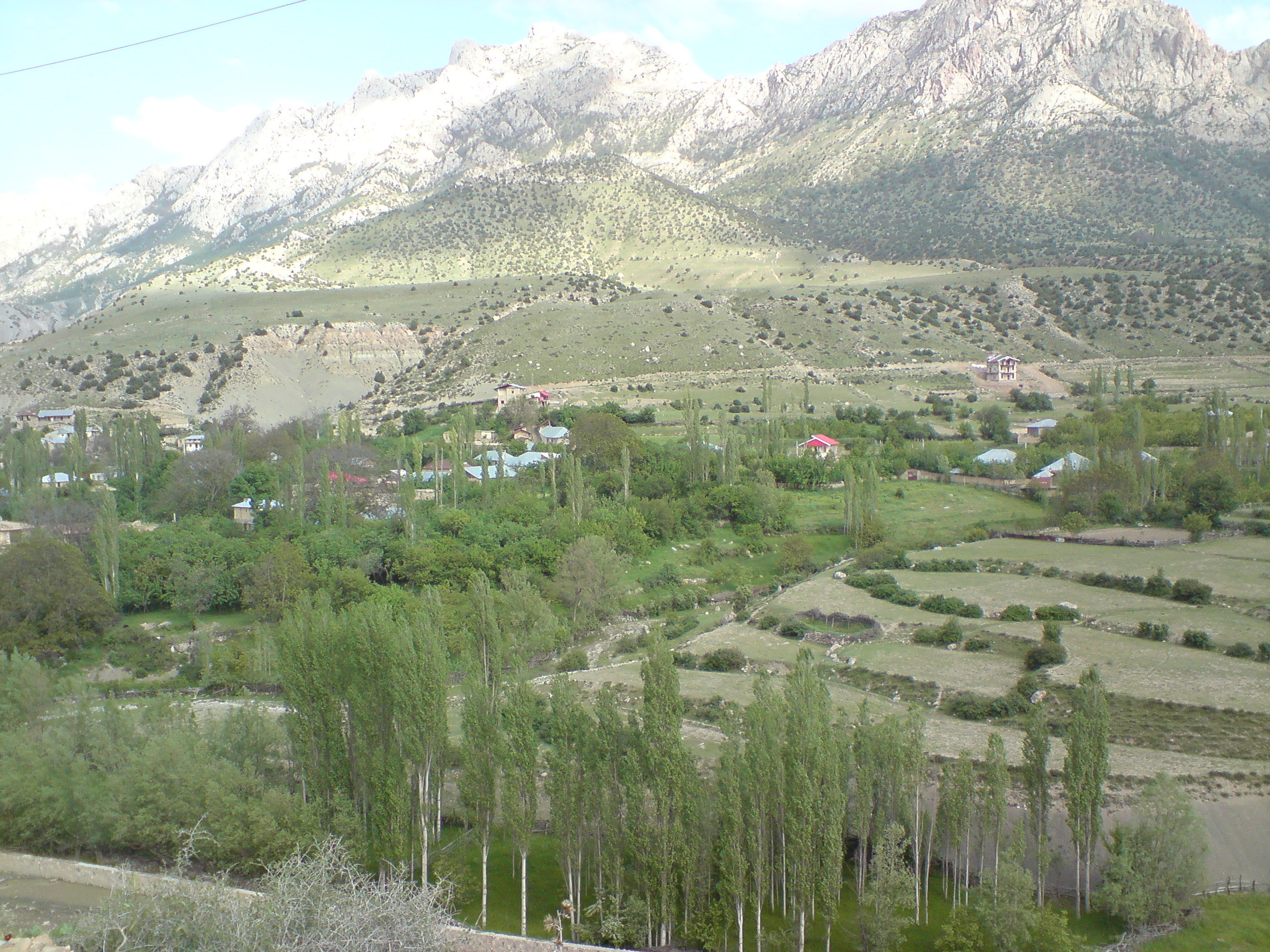
- The village of Molla Deh

- Location within Iran
- Coordinates: 36°02′14″N 53°24′42″E
- Country: Iran
- Province: Semnan
- County: Mehdishahr
- District: Shahmirzad
- Rural District: Poshtkuh

Population (2016)
  - Total: 100
- Time zone: UTC+3:30 (IRST)

Molla Deh (Persian: ملاده) (Note: Also romanized as Mollā Deh) is a village in Poshtkuh Rural District of Shahmirzad District in Mehdishahr County, Semnan province, Iran.

== Demographics ==
=== Population ===
At the time of the 2006 National Census, the village's population was 59 in 24 households, when it was in the former Mehdishahr District of Semnan County. The following census in 2011 counted 99 people in 47 households, by which time the district had been separated from the county in the establishment of Mehdishahr County. The rural district was transferred to the new Shahmirzad District. The 2016 census measured the population of the village as 100 people in 41 households.
