= Owpert =

Village in Semnan province, Iran

Owpert Persian: اوپرت
- Village
- Location within Iran
- Coordinates: 36°01′42″N 53°19′41″E
- Country: Iran
- Province: Semnan
- County: Mehdishahr
- District: Shahmirzad
- Rural District: Chashm

Population (2016)
  - Total: 33
- Time zone: UTC+3:30 (IRST)

Owpert (Persian: اوپرت) is a village in Chashm Rural District of Shahmirzad District in Mehdishahr County, Semnan province, Iran.

== Demographics ==
=== Population ===
The village did not appear in the 2006 census, when it was in the former Mehdishahr District of Semnan County. The village also did not appear in the following census of 2011, by which time the district had been separated from the county in the establishment of Mehdishahr County. The rural district was transferred to the new Shahmirzad District. The 2016 census measured the population of the village as 33 people in 10 households.
