= Hiku =

Village in Semnan province, Iran

Hiku Persian: هيكو
- Village
- Location within Iran
- Coordinates: 36°00′17″N 53°20′01″E
- Country: Iran
- Province: Semnan
- County: Mehdishahr
- District: Shahmirzad
- Rural District: Chashm

Population (2016)
  - Total: 173
- Time zone: UTC+3:30 (IRST)

Hiku (Persian: هيكو) (Note: Also romanized as Hīkū; also known as Hī Kūh and Hīkūh) is a village in Chashm Rural District of Shahmirzad District in Mehdishahr County, Semnan province, Iran.

== Demographics ==
=== Population ===
At the time of the 2006 census, the village's population was 62 in 29 households, when it was in the former Mehdishahr District of Semnan County. The following census in 2011 counted 133 people in 40 households, by which time the district had been separated from the county in the establishment of Mehdishahr County. The rural district was transferred to the new Shahmirzad District. The 2016 census measured the population of the village as 173 people in 59 households.
