= Sheli =

Village in Semnan province, Iran

Sheli Persian: شلی
- Village
- Location within Iran
- Coordinates: 36°00′41″N 53°23′12″E
- Country: Iran
- Province: Semnan
- County: Mehdishahr
- District: Shahmirzad
- Rural District: Poshtkuh

Population (2016)
  - Total: 179
- Time zone: UTC+3:30 (IRST)

Sheli (Persian: شلی) (Note: Also romanized as Shelī; also known as Sheleh) is a village in Poshtkuh Rural District of Shahmirzad District in Mehdishahr County, Semnan province, Iran.

== Demographics ==
=== Population ===
At the time of the 2006 National Census, the village's population was 92 in 42 households, when it was in the former Mehdishahr District of Semnan County. The following census in 2011 counted 247 people in 84 households, by which time the district had been separated from the county in the establishment of Mehdishahr County. The rural district was transferred to the new Shahmirzad District. The 2016 census measured the population of the village as 179 people in 60 households.
