= Dasht-e Sefid =

Dasht-e Sefid (Persian: دشت سفيد) may refer to:

- Dasht-e Sefid, Afghanistan
- Dasht-e Sefid, Iran
