= Khatirkuh =

Village in Semnan province, Iran

Khatirkuh Persian: خطيركوه
- Village
- Location within Iran
- Coordinates: 35°53′42″N 53°05′34″E
- Country: Iran
- Province: Semnan
- County: Mehdishahr
- District: Shahmirzad
- Rural District: Chashm

Population (2016)
  - Total: 238
- Time zone: UTC+3:30 (IRST)

Khatirkuh (Persian: خطيركوه) (Note: Also romanized as Khaṭīrḵūh; also known as Komrūd (كمرود)) is a village in Chashm Rural District of Shahmirzad District in Mehdishahr County, Semnan province, Iran.

== Demographics ==
=== Population ===
At the time of the 2006 census, the village's population was 298 in 101 households, when it was in the former Mehdishahr District of Semnan County. The following census in 2011 counted 478 people in 155 households, by which time the district had been separated from the county in the establishment of Mehdishahr County. The rural district was transferred to the new Shahmirzad District. The 2016 census measured the population of the village as 238 people in 88 households.
