= Dasht-e Sefid, Iran =

Village in Semnan province, Iran

Dasht-e Sefid Persian: دشت سفيد
- Village
- Location within Iran
- Coordinates: 35°46′40″N 53°11′42″E
- Country: Iran
- Province: Semnan
- County: Mehdishahr
- District: Shahmirzad
- Rural District: Chashm

Population (2016)
  - Total: 50
- Time zone: UTC+3:30 (IRST)

Dasht-e Sefid (Persian: دشت سفيد) (Note: Also romanized as Dasht-e Sefīd) is a village in Chashm Rural District of Shahmirzad District in Mehdishahr County, Semnan province, Iran.

== Demographics ==
=== Population ===
At the time of the 2006 census, the village's population was 43 in 13 households, when it was in the former Mehdishahr District of Semnan County. The following census in 2011 counted 79 people in 27 households, by which time the district had been separated from the county in the establishment of Mehdishahr County. The rural district was transferred to the new Shahmirzad District. The 2016 census measured the population of the village as 50 people in 19 households.
