= Lerd, Semnan =

Village in Semnan province, Iran

Lerd Persian: لرد
- Village
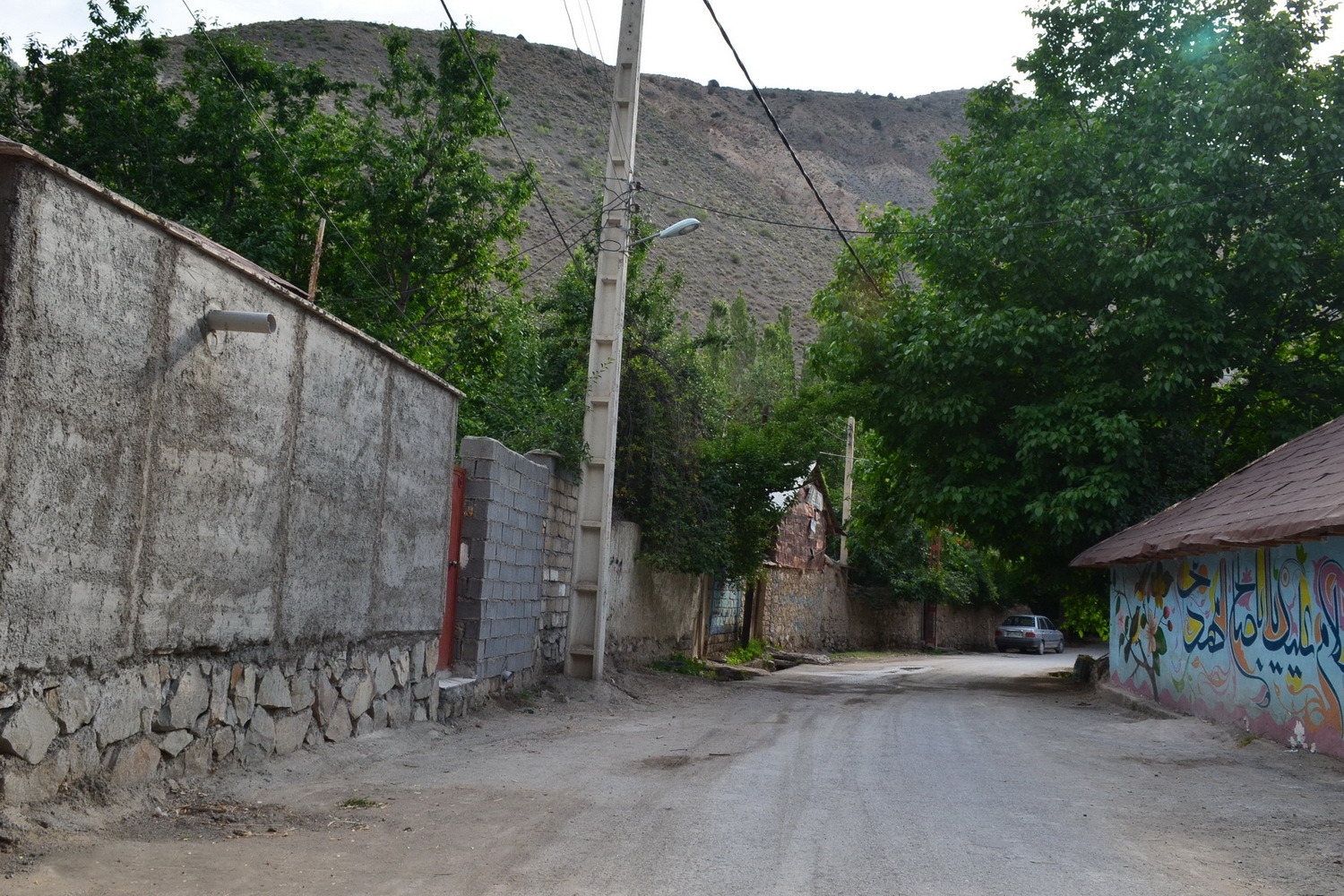
- The village of Lerd

- Location within Iran
- Coordinates: 35°53′16″N 53°08′54″E
- Country: Iran
- Province: Semnan
- County: Mehdishahr
- District: Shahmirzad
- Rural District: Chashm

Population (2016)
  - Total: 219
- Time zone: UTC+3:30 (IRST)

Lerd (Persian: لرد) is a village in Chashm Rural District of Shahmirzad District in Mehdishahr County, Semnan province, Iran.

== Demographics ==
=== Population ===
At the time of the 2006 census, the village's population was 254 in 60 households, when it was in the former Mehdishahr District of Semnan County. The following census in 2011 counted 268 people in 79 households, by which time the district had been separated from the county in the establishment of Mehdishahr County. The rural district was transferred to the new Shahmirzad District. The 2016 census measured the population of the village as 219 people in 75 households.
