= Rudbarak-e Pain =

Neighborhood in Semnan province, Iran

Rudbarak-e Pain Persian: رودبارك پائين
- Neighborhood
- Location within Iran
- Country: Iran
- Province: Semnan
- County: Mehdishahr
- District: Shahmirzad
- Rural District: Poshtkuh
- Village: Rudbarak

Population (2011)
  - Total: 45
- Time zone: UTC+3:30 (IRST)

Rudbarak-e Pain (Persian: رودبارك پائين) (Note: Also romanized as Rūdbārak-e Pā’īn) is a neighborhood in the village of Rudbarak in Poshtkuh Rural District of Shahmirzad District in Mehdishahr County, Semnan province, Iran.

== Demographics ==
=== Population ===
At the time of the 2006 National Census, Rudbarak-e Pain's population was 18 in 12 households, when it was a village in Poshtkuh Rural District of the former Mehdishahr District in Semnan County. The following census in 2011 counted 45 people in 20 households, by which time the district had been separated from the county in the establishment of Mehdishahr County. The rural district was transferred to the new Shahmirzad District. After the census, Rudbarak-e Pain merged with the village of Rudbarak-e Bala to become the village of Rudbarak.
