= Rudbar, Semnan =

Village in Semnan province, Iran

Rudbar Persian: رودبار
- Village
- Rudbar village

- Location within Iran
- Coordinates: 35°53′27″N 53°08′28″E type = Country
- Province: Semnan
- County: Mehdishahr
- District: Shahmirzad
- Rural District: Chashm

Population (2016)
  - Total: 142
- Time zone: UTC+3:30 (IRST)

Rudbar (Persian: رودبار) (Note: Also romanized as Rūdbār) is a village in Chashm Rural District of Shahmirzad District in Mehdishahr County, Semnan province, Iran.

== Demographics ==
=== Population ===
At the time of the 2006 census, the village's population was 213 in 52 households, when it was in the former Mehdishahr District of Semnan County. The following census in 2011 counted 204 people in 62 households, by which time the district had been separated from the county in the establishment of Mehdishahr County. The rural district was transferred to the new Shahmirzad District. The 2016 census measured the population of the village as 142 people in 49 households.
