= Lerd =

Lerd (Persian: لرد) may refer to:

- Lerd, Ardabil, Iran
- Lerd, Semnan, Iran
