= Keyvan Vahdani =

Iranian footballer (1991–2019)

Personal information
- Full name: Keyvan Vahdani
- Date of birth: 1 April 1991
- Place of birth: Tehran, Iran
- Date of death: 20 March 2019 (aged 27)
- Place of death: Khatirkuh, Iran
- Height: 1.79 m (5 ft 10 in)
- Position: Forward

Youth career
- –2012: Moghavemat

Senior career*
Years	Team	Apps	(Gls)
2012–2015	Paykan	23	(2)
2015–2016	Nassaji	16	(0)
2016–2017	Pars Jonoubi	7	(1)
2017–2018	Saba Qom	8	(1)
2018	Aluminium Arak	5	(0)
- * Club domestic league appearances and goals

Keyvan Vahdani (Persian: کیوان وحدانی; 18 December 2000 – 20 March 2019) was an Iranian footballer. He played for Paykan, Nassaji and Pars Jonoubi.
