= Kulim (disambiguation) =

Kulim is a district and town in the state of Kedah, Malaysia.

Kulim may also refer to:

- Kulim, Iran, village in Iran
- Kulim (state constituency)
