= Darjazin Rural District =

Rural district in Semnan province, Iran

Darjazin Rural District Persian: دهستان درجزين
- Rural District
- Location within Iran
- Coordinates: 35°44′N 53°20′E
- Country: Iran
- Province: Semnan
- County: Mehdishahr
- District: Central
- Established: 2007
- Capital: Darjazin

Population (2016)
  - Total: 299
- Time zone: UTC+3:30 (IRST)

Darjazin Rural District (Persian: دهستان درجزين) is in the Central District of Mehdishahr County, Semnan province, Iran. It is administered from the city of Darjazin.

== History ==
In 2007, Mehdishahr District was separated from Semnan County in the establishment of Mehdishahr County, and Darjazin Rural District was created in the new Central District.

== Demographics ==
=== Population ===
At the time of the 2011 National Census, the rural district's population was 296 in 41 households. The 2016 census measured the population of the rural district as 299 in 75 households. The most populous of its 43 villages was Darband, with 76 people.

=== Other villages in the rural district ===
- Aliabad
- Emamzadeh Zeynali
- Marg Sar
