= Rudbarak, Semnan =

Village in Semnan province, Iran

Rudbarak Persian: رودبارک
- Village
- Location within Iran
- Coordinates: 36°03′11″N 53°33′18″E
- Country: Iran
- Province: Semnan
- County: Mehdishahr
- District: Shahmirzad
- Rural District: Poshtkuh

Population (2016)
  - Total: 107
- Time zone: UTC+3:30 (IRST)

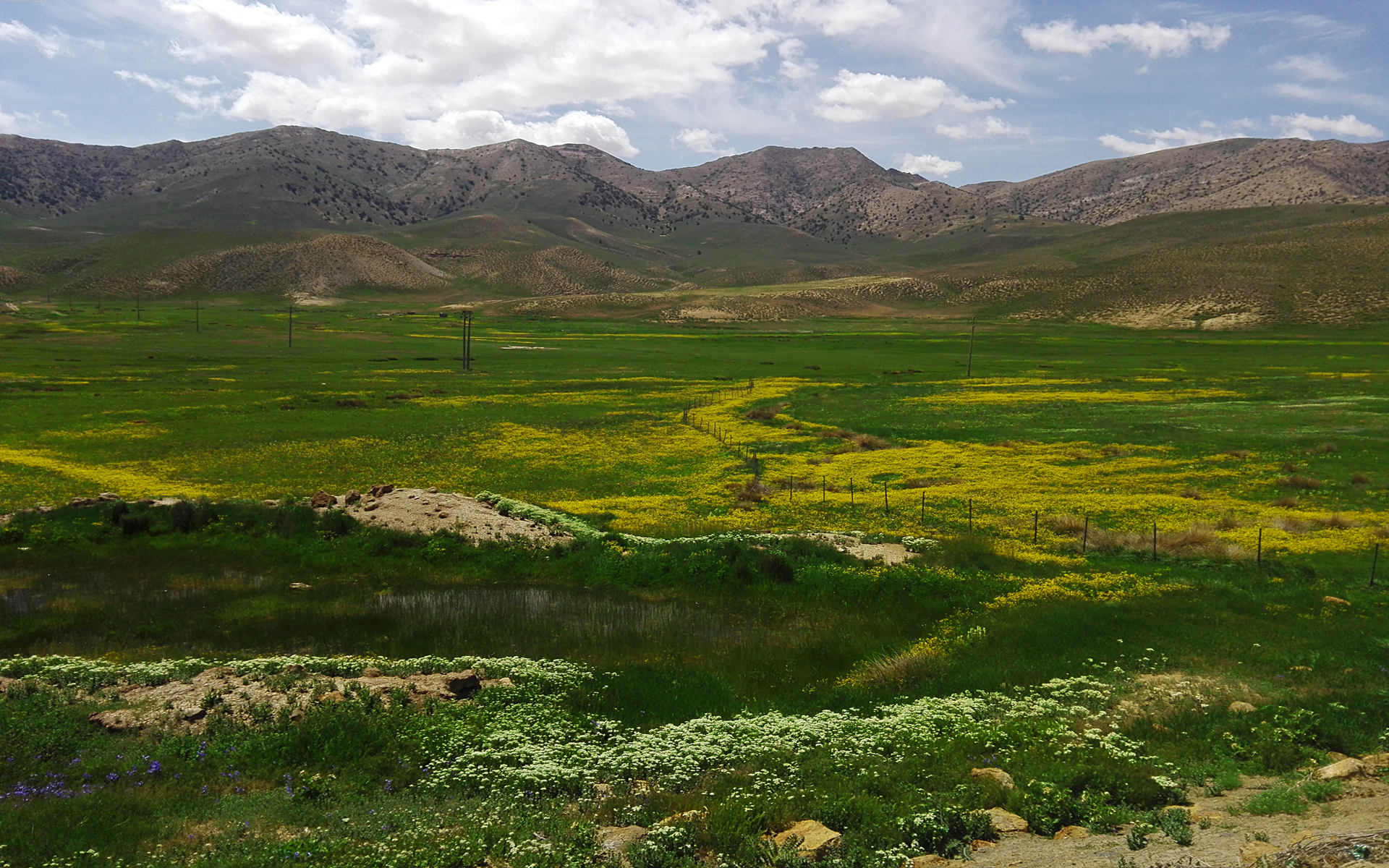

Rudbarak (Persian: رودبارک) (Note: Also romanized as Rūdbārak; formerly known as Rudbarak-e Bala (رودبارك بالا), also romanized as Rūdbārak-e Bālā; also known as Rūdbār) is a village in Poshtkuh Rural District of Shahmirzad District in Mehdishahr County, Semnan province, Iran. The village hosts the National Festival of Iranian Traditions and Folk Games.

== Demographics ==
=== Population ===
At the time of the 2006 National Census, the village's population, as Rudbarak-e Bala, was 17 in eight households, when it was in the former Mehdishahr District of Semnan County. The following census in 2011 counted 76 people in 26 households, by which time the district had been separated from the county in the establishment of Mehdishahr County. The rural district was transferred to the new Shahmirzad District. The 2016 census measured the population of the village as 107 people in 34 households, when it had merged with the village of Rudbarak-e Pain to become the village of Rudbarak.
