= Shahmirzad =

City in Semnan province, Iran

Shahmirzad Persian: شهميرزاد
- City
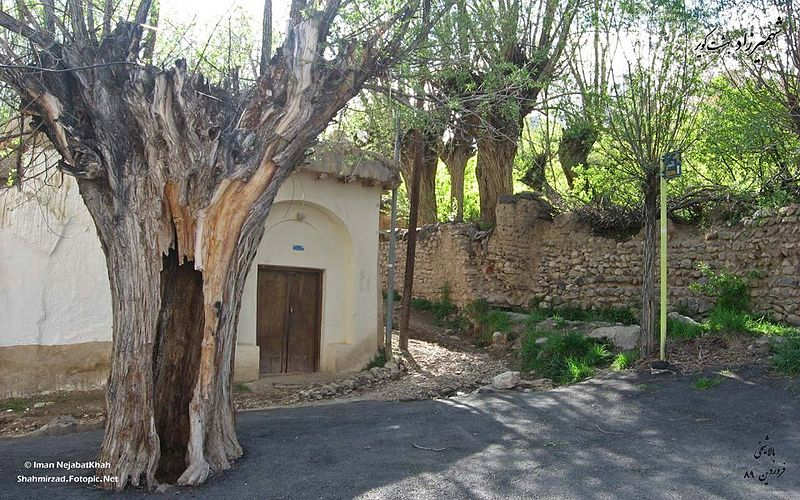
- The Bala Sheikhi neighborhood in the city of Shahmirzad

- Location within Iran
- Coordinates: 35°46′12″N 53°20′01″E
- Country: Iran
- Province: Semnan
- County: Mehdishahr
- District: Shahmirzad

Population (2016)
  - Total: 11,191
- Time zone: UTC+3:30 (IRST)
- Website: https://www.shahmirzad.city/En

Shahmirzad (Persian: شهميرزاد) (Note: Also romanized as Shahmīrzād; also known as Shamīrzād; also known locally as Shamirza (شامرزا)) is a city in, and the capital of, Shahmirzad District in Mehdishahr County, Semnan province, Iran. Shahmirzad is in the northern part of the country and on the southern slopes of the Alborz Mountains.

== Demographics ==
=== Language ===
The Shahmirzadi language (شامرزایی) is a Caspian language close to Mazandarani.

=== Population ===
At the time of the 2006 National Census, the city's population was 7,273 in 1,860 households, when it was in the former Mehdishahr District of Semnan County. The following census in 2011 counted 8,882 people in 2,625 households, by which time the district had been separated from the county in the establishment of Mehdishahr County. Shahmirzad was transferred to the new Shahmirzad District. The 2016 census measured the population of the city as 11,191 people in 3,789 households. During the summer, the city's population approaches 40,000 as tourists come for its cool climate and popular gardens.

== Overview ==
Shahmirzad has been home to people of diverse ethnic backgrounds, a large group of whom seasonally settled in cities and towns of Mazandaran province, such as Babol, Sari, Neka, and Behshahr. During the past decades many Muslim, Bahá'í, and Shahmirzadi Jews, migrated to larger cities in Iran and abroad, most notably the San Francisco Bay Area.

Shahmirzad's walnut orchard, with a size of 700 ha, is noted by the UN's Food and Agriculture Organization as the largest of its kind in the world. Shahmirzadi homeowners are given a proprietary interest in the walnut orchard in proportion to the amount of land they own in the city. Shahmirzad also produces the mineral water called "Tenab-e Shahmirzad."

== Notable people ==
- Zabihollah Safa, Iran scholar and professor at the University of Tehran (d. 1999)
- Hají Ákhúnd, Apostle of Baháʼu'lláh, Hand of the Cause in the Bahá’í Faith
