= Rud Bar-e Firuz Ja =

Rud Bar-e Firuz Ja رودبارفيروزجا
- Village
- Location within Iran
- Coordinates: 36°21′00″N 52°41′00″E
- Country: Iran
- Province: Mazandaran
- County: Babol
- Bakhsh: Bandpey-ye Sharqi
- Rural District: Sajjadrud

Population (2016)
  - Total: 115
- Time zone: UTC+3:30 (IRST)

Rud Bar-e Firuz Ja (Persian: رودبارفيروزجا, also Romanized as Rūd Bār-e Fīrūz Jā; also known as Rūd Bār) is a village in Sajjadrud Rural District, Bandpey-ye Sharqi District, Babol County, Mazandaran Province, Iran. At the 2016 census, its population was 115, in 35 families. Up from 97 in 2006.
