= Rudbar Rural District =

Rudbar Rural District (Persian: دهستان رودبار) may refer to:

- Rudbar Rural District (Hormozgan Province)
- Rudbar Rural District (Kerman Province)
- Rudbar Rural District (Markazi Province)
- Rudbar Rural District (Semnan Province)
- Rudbar Rural District (Sirvan County), Ilam province
