= Mehdishahr =

City in Semnan province, Iran

Mehdishahr Persian: مهدی‌شهر
- City
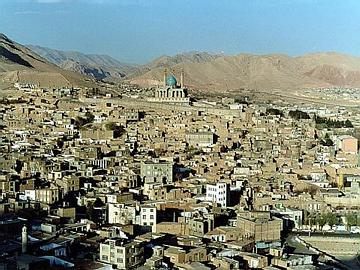
- Sangesar district of Mehdishahr

- Location within Iran
- Coordinates: 35°42′52″N 53°21′25″E
- Country: Iran
- Province: Semnan
- County: Mehdishahr
- District: Central

Population (2016)
  - Total: 24,485
- Time zone: UTC+3:30 (IRST)
- Area code: +98 (232)

Mehdishahr (Persian: مهدی‌شهر) (Note: Also romanized as Mehdīshahr; formerly known as Sang-e Sar (سَنگِ سَر), also romanized as Sang-i-Sar and Sangsar) is a city in the Central District of Mehdishahr County, Semnan province, Iran, serving as capital of both the county and the district.

== History ==
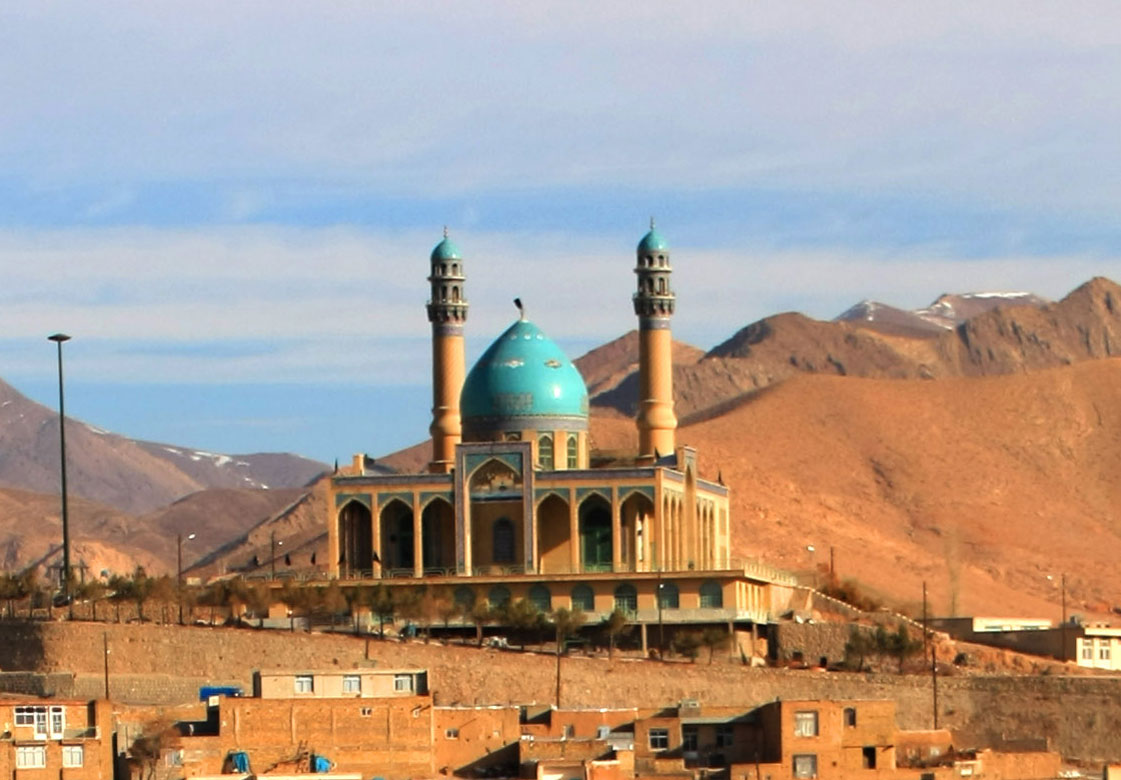
Almahdi mosque

Sangesari people, who live in the city of Sangesar, speak Sangesari and live in the large geographic area of Sangesar. Sangesar has a long history dating back to the 1st millennium BC. The first inhabitants of Sangesar used to worship Indo-European deities, and for the past 4000 years, even after the arrival of Arab invaders, they remained Zoroastrians. Like the rest of Iran, they were forced to convert to Shiite Islam after the arrival of the Safavid dynasty. Although there are many theories about Sangesar's name, one of them emphasizes a Saka origin and suggests the name was Sakasar or Saksar, meaning "Saka" (Scythian) settlement, others believe the name comes from Sang (Stone) Sar (Head), literally meaning people who fight to their graves. A large number of Sangesari converted to the Bahai religion in the late 1800s and achieved prominent roles in Pahlavi Iran. After the 1979 revolution, the Islamic Republic renamed the city from Sangesar to MehdiShahr (The city of the savior) to punish the population and to assert Islamic identity.

== Demographics ==
=== Religion ===
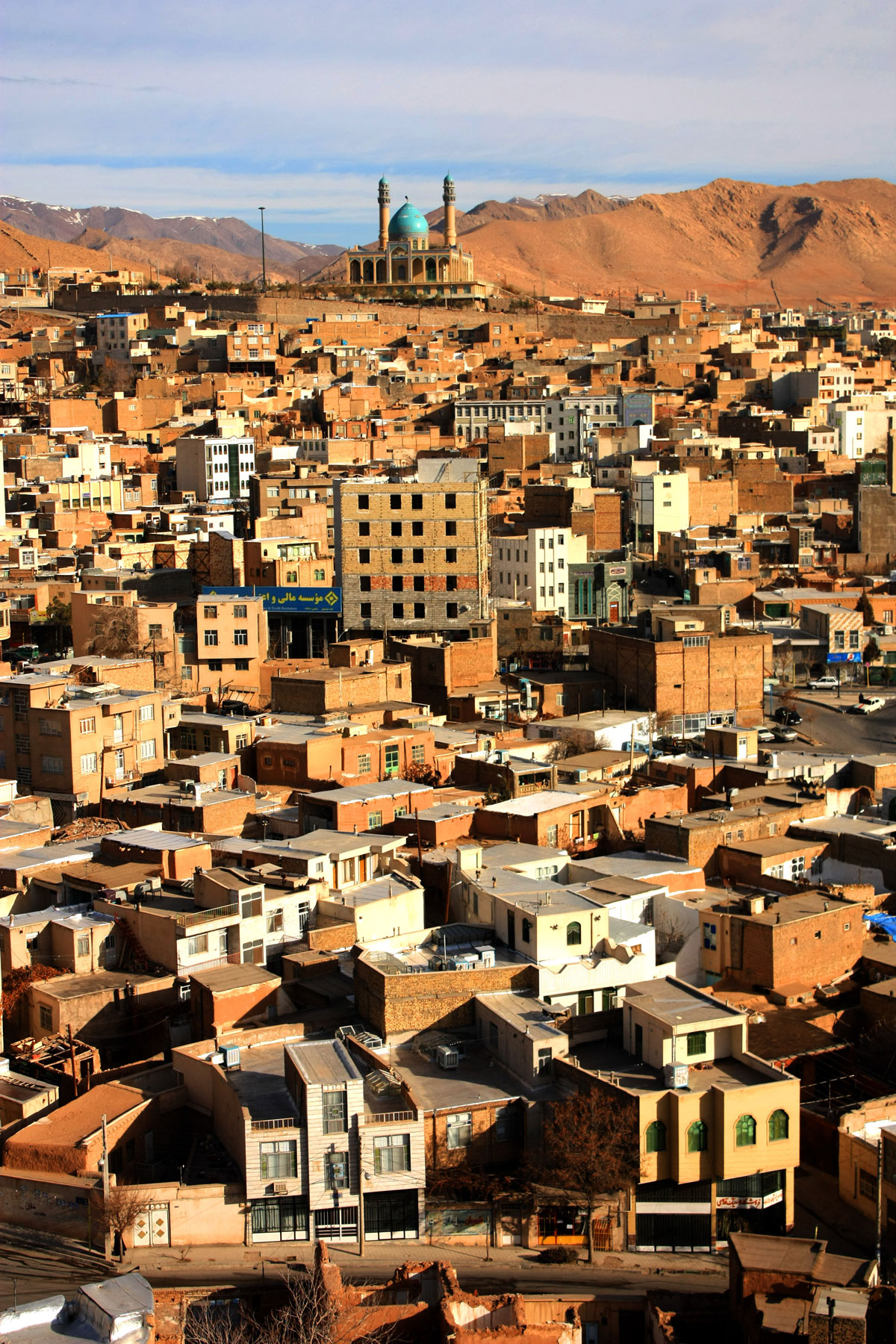
View of the old town with mosque in the background

The primary religious belief in the area now is Shi‘ite Islam. Before the 1979 Iranian Revolution, a major segment of Sangsar's population became followers of the Baháʼí Faith. The Bahais migrated from Sangesar to Tehran after the revolution.

=== Population ===
At the time of the 2006 National Census, the city's population was 20,581 in 5,473 households, when it was capital of the former Mehdishahr District in Semnan County. The following census in 2011 counted 19,854 people in 5,705 households, by which time the district had been separated from the county in the establishment of Mehdishahr County. Mehdishahr was transferred to the new Central District as the county's capital. The 2016 census measured the population of the city as 24,485 people in 7,679 households.

== Geography ==
Sangesar is on the southern slopes of the Alborz mountains. Here, the chain of Alborz mountains is very close to the desert of Dasht-e Kavir. Sangesar, specially the northern part of it, is completely mountainous with cold winters, heavy snowfalls but with mild summers. The distance between Sangesar city and Semnan city is 20 kilometers. The altitude is about 1630 meters above sea level.

== Transportation ==
The most important network of roads consists of Semnan to Sangsar to Shahmirzad to Fooladmahale axis which connects these places with the city of Sari. This road connects the two provinces of Mazandaran and Semnan.

== Notable people ==
- Majid Derakhshani, musician and composer
- Parviz Sabeti, deputy of SAVAK
- Alexander Seifalian, Professor, living in the United Kingdom.

== Sister cities ==
Sangesar has signed the treaty of city twinning with the following cities:

- Saskatoon, Canada
- Mörön, Mongolia

== See also ==
- Sangsari language
