= Rudbarak, Gilan =

Rudbarak رودبارک
- Village
- Location within Iran
- Coordinates: 36°49′23″N 50°14′33″E
- Country: Iran
- Province: Gilan
- County: Rudsar
- Bakhsh: Rahimabad
- Rural District: Eshkevar-e Sofla

Population (2016)
  - Total: 38
- Time zone: UTC+3:30 (IRST)

Rudbarak (Persian: رودبارک, also romanized as Rūdbārak) is a village in Eshkevar-e Sofla Rural District, Rahimabad District, Rudsar County, Gilan Province, Iran.

At the time of the 2006 National Census, the village's population was 43 in 14 households. The following census in 2011 counted 45 people in 14 households. The 2016 census measured the population of the village as 38 people in 14 households.
