= Dasht-e Sefid, Afghanistan =

Dasht-e Sefid
- Location in Afghanistan
- Coordinates: 35°19′19″N 67°54′32″E
- Country: Afghanistan
- Province: Bamyan Province
- Time zone: + 4.30

Dasht-e Sefid is a village in Bamyan Province in central Afghanistan.

== See also ==
- Bamyan Province
