= Rudbar, Bastak =

Rudbar رودبار
- Village
- Location within Iran
- Coordinates: 27°09′56″N 55°04′09″E
- Country: Iran
- Province: Hormozgan
- County: Bastak
- Bakhsh: Central
- Rural District: Deh Tall

Population (2006)
  - Total: 803
- Time zone: UTC+3:30 (IRST)

Rudbar (Persian: رودبار, also Romanized as Rūdbār; also known as Rūdbār-e Gowdeh and Rūdbār Kowdeh) is a village in Deh Tall Rural District, in the Central District of Bastak County, Hormozgan Province, Iran. At the 2006 census, its population was 803, in 163 families.
