= Poshtkuh Rural District (Mehdishahr County) =

Rural district in Semnan province, Iran

Poshtkuh Rural District Persian: دهستان پشتكوه
- Rural District
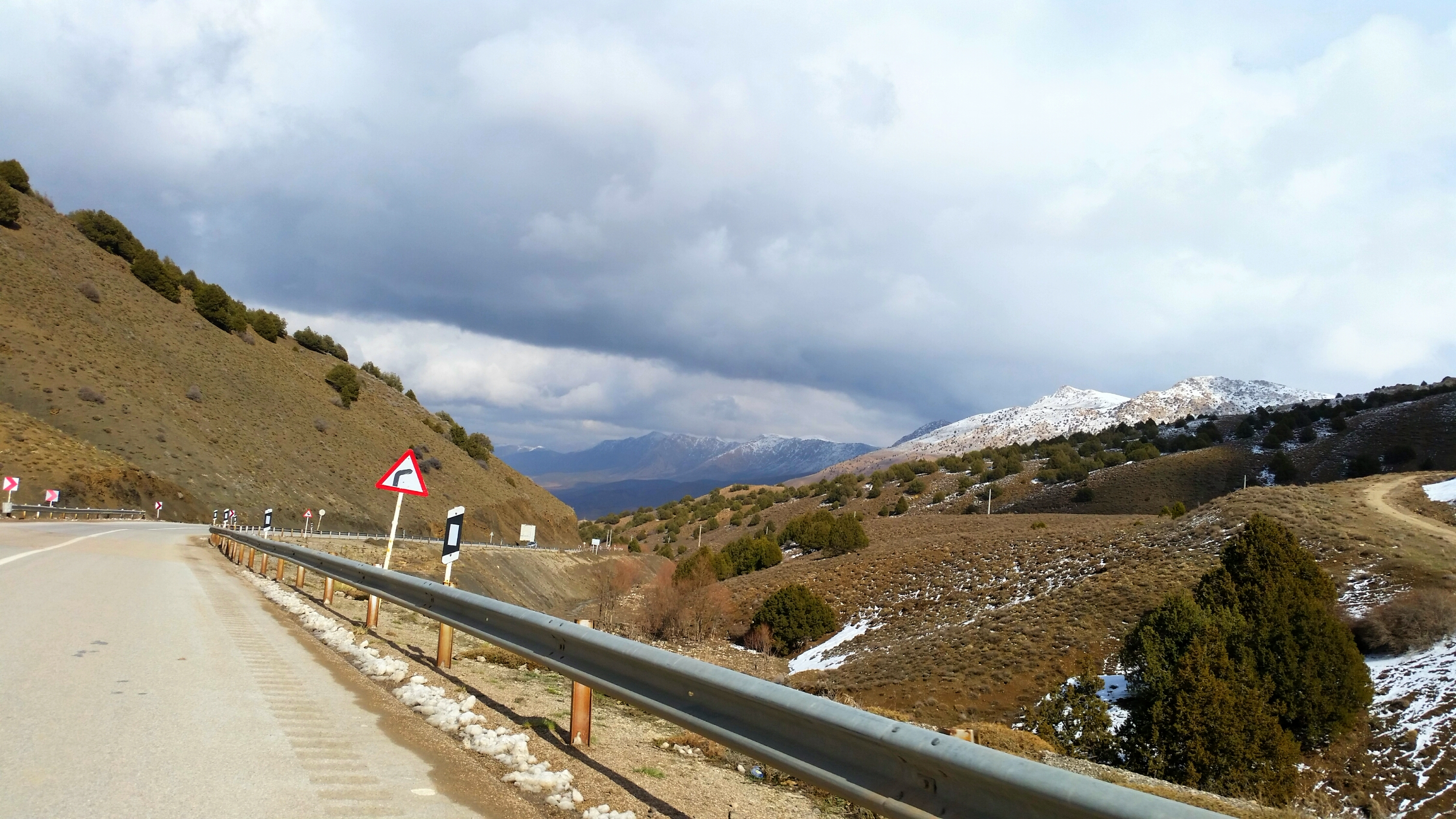
- Rural district landscape, Shahmirzad-Kiasar road

- Location within Iran
- Coordinates: 35°57′N 53°36′E
- Country: Iran
- Province: Semnan
- County: Mehdishahr
- District: Shahmirzad
- Established: 1987
- Capital: Fulad Mahalleh

Population (2016)
  - Total: 3,844
- Time zone: UTC+3:30 (IRST)

Poshtkuh Rural District (Persian: دهستان پشتكوه) is in Shahmirzad District of Mehdishahr County, Semnan province, Iran. Its capital is the village of Fulad Mahalleh.

== Demographics ==
=== Population ===
At the time of the 2006 National Census, the rural district's population (as a part of the former Mehdishahr District in Semnan County) was 1,825 in 561 households. There were 5,717 inhabitants in 1,609 households at the following census of 2011, by which time the district had been separated from the county in the establishment of Mehdishahr County. The rural district was transferred to the new Shahmirzad District. The 2016 census measured the population of the rural district as 3,844 in 1,326 households. The most populous of its 68 villages was Fulad Mahalleh, with 2,518 people.

=== Other villages in the rural district ===
- Deh Sufian
- Fenesk
- Kavard
- Kolim
- Molla Deh
- Rudbarak
- Sheli
- Talajim

== Gallery ==
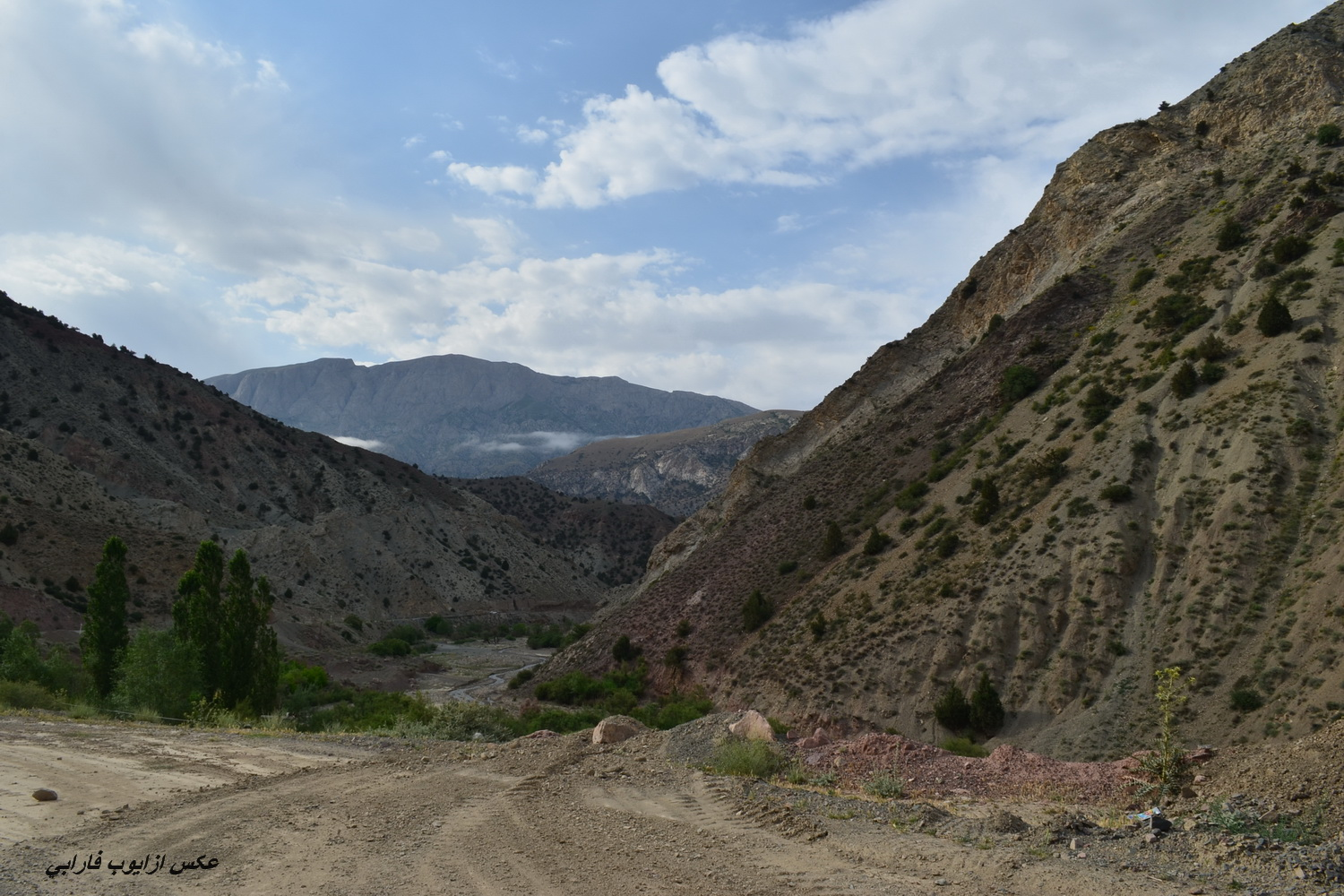
Landscape in June

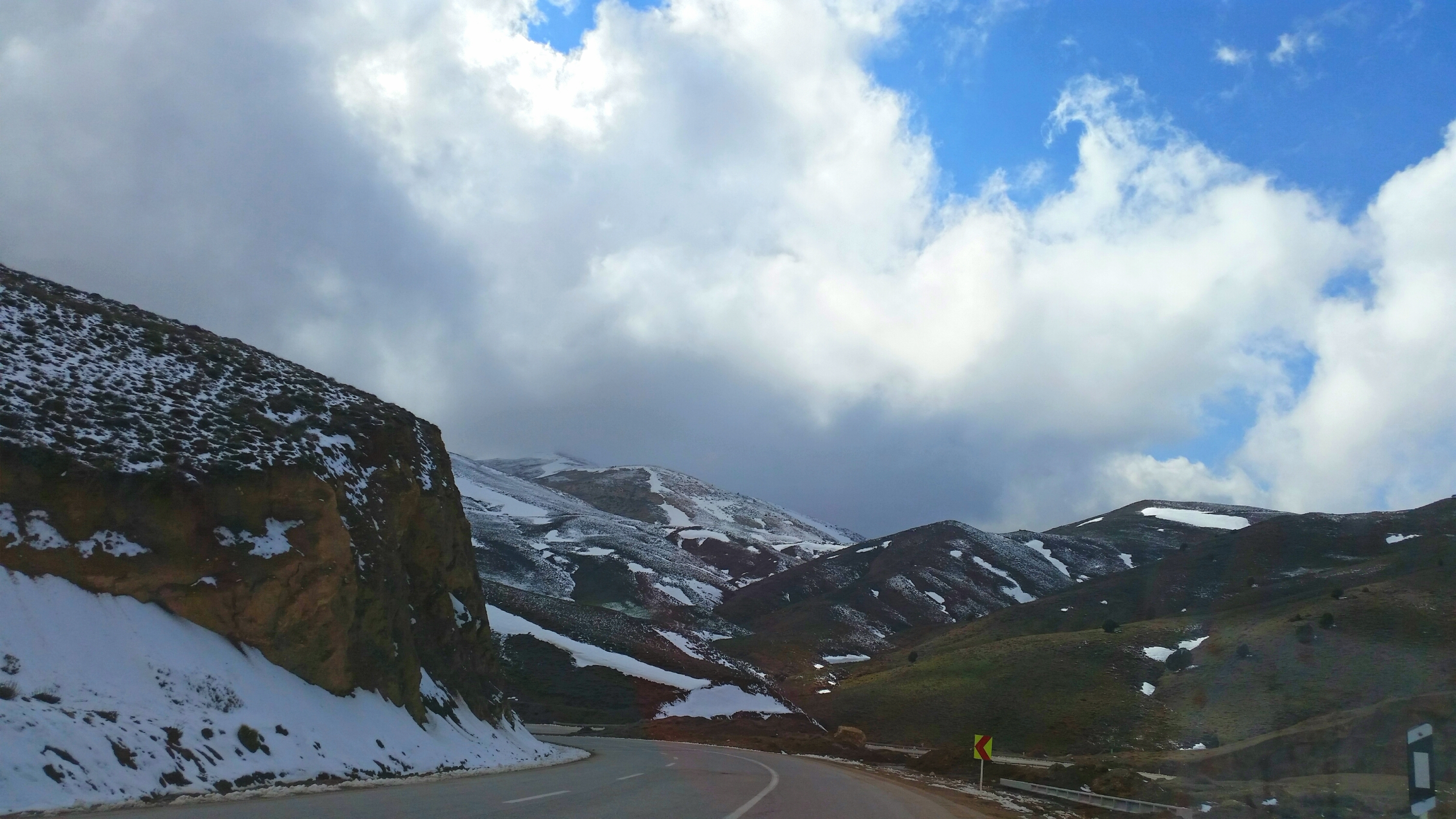
Landscape in March

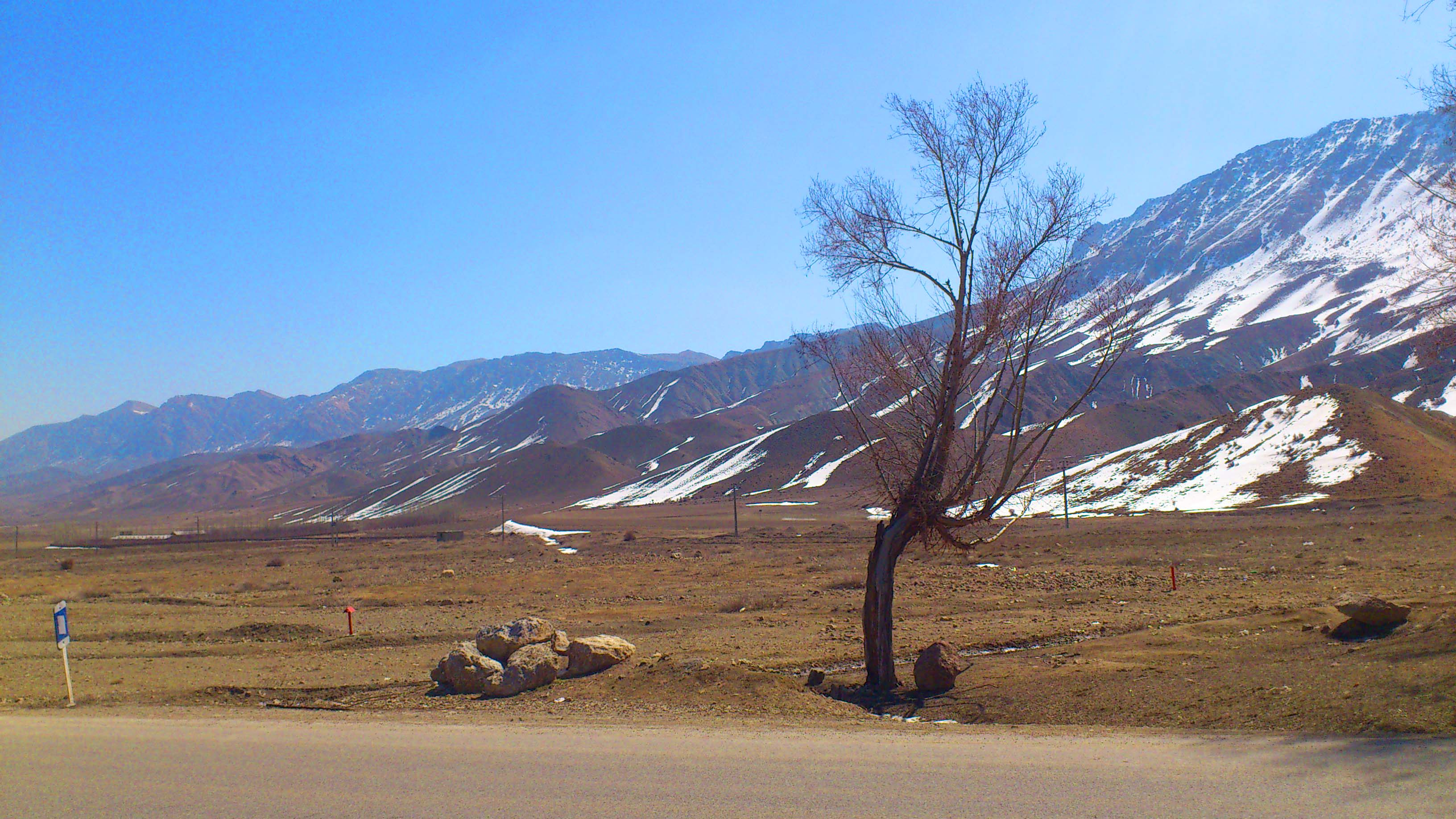

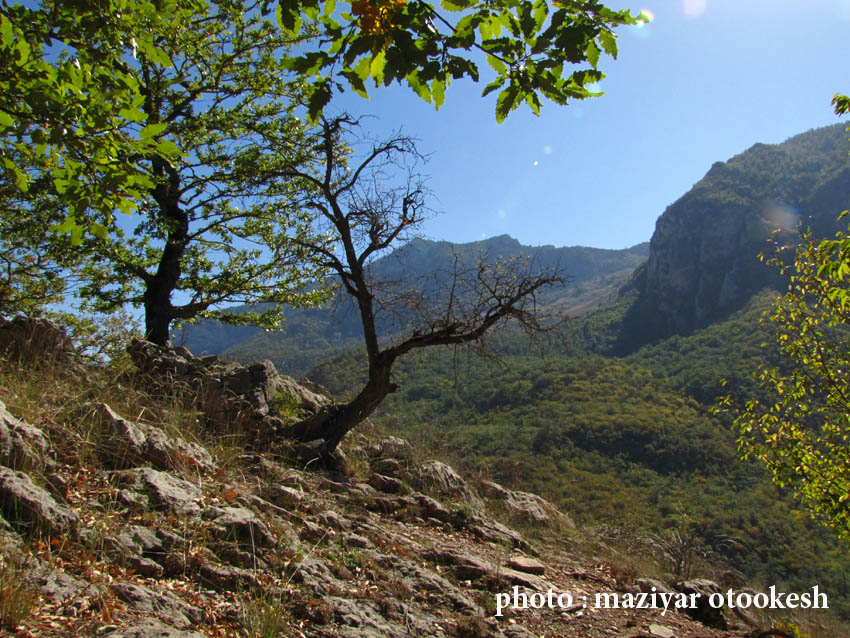
Forests of Finesk
