= Central District (Mehdishahr County) =

District in Semnan province, Iran

Central District (Mehdishahr County) Persian: بخش مرکزی شهرستان مهدی‌شهر
- District
- Location within Iran
- Coordinates: 35°44′N 53°20′E
- Country: Iran
- Province: Semnan
- County: Mehdishahr
- Established: 2007
- Capital: Mehdishahr

Population (2016)
  - Total: 30,781
- Time zone: UTC+3:30 (IRST)

The Central District of Mehdishahr County (Persian: بخش مرکزی شهرستان مهدی‌شهر) is in Semnan province, Iran. Its capital is the city of Mehdishahr.

== History ==
In 2007, Mehdishahr District was separated from Semnan County in the establishment of Mehdishahr County, which was divided into two districts and three rural districts, with Mehdishahr as its capital.

== Demographics ==
=== Population ===
At the time of the 2011 National Census, the district's population was 25,114 people in 7,105 households. The 2016 census measured the population of the district as 30,781 inhabitants in 9,531 households.

=== Administrative divisions ===
Central District (Mehdishahr County) Population
Administrative Divisions	2011	2016
Darjazin RD	296	299
Darjazin (city) (Note: Became a city after the 2006 census)	4,964	5,997
Mehdishahr (city)	19,854	24,485
Total	25,114	30,781
RD = Rural District
