= Chashm Rural District =

Rural district in Semnan province, Iran

Chashm Rural District Persian: دهستان چاشم
- Rural District
- Location within Iran
- Coordinates: 35°53′N 53°13′E
- Country: Iran
- Province: Semnan
- County: Mehdishahr
- District: Shahmirzad
- Established: 1987
- Capital: Chashm

Population (2016)
  - Total: 1,659
- Time zone: UTC+3:30 (IRST)

Chashm Rural District (Persian: دهستان چاشم) is in Shahmirzad District of Mehdishahr County, Semnan province, Iran. Its capital is the village of Chashm.

== Demographics ==
=== Population ===
At the time of the 2006 National Census, the rural district's population (as a part of the former Mehdishahr District in Semnan County) was 6,414 in 1,679 households. There were 2,183 inhabitants in 674 households at the following census of 2011, by which time the district had been separated from the county in the establishment of Mehdishahr County. The rural district was transferred to the new Shahmirzad District. The 2016 census measured the population of the rural district as 1,659 in 580 households. The most populous of its 102 villages was Chashm, with 566 people.

=== Other villages in the rural district ===
- Artat
- Dasht-e Sefid
- Hiku
- Khatirkuh
- Lerd
- Owpert
- Pa Qaleh
- Rudbar
