= Shahmirzad District =

District in Semnan province, Iran

Shahmirzad District Persian: بخش شهمیرزاد
- District
- Location within Iran
- Coordinates: 35°55′N 53°26′E
- Country: Iran
- Province: Semnan
- County: Mehdishahr
- Established: 2007
- Capital: Shamirzad

Population (2016)
  - Total: 16,694
- Time zone: UTC+3:30 (IRST)

Shahmirzad District (Persian: بخش شهمیرزاد) is in Mehdishahr County, Semnan province, Iran. Its capital is the city of Shamirzad.

== History ==
In 2007, Mehdishahr District was separated from Semnan County in the establishment of Mehdishahr County, which was divided into two districts and three rural districts, with the city of Mehdishahr as its capital.

== Demographics ==
=== Population ===
At the time of the 2011 National Census, the district's population was 16,782 people in 4,908 households. The 2016 census measured the population of the district as 16,694 inhabitants in 5,695 households.

=== Administrative divisions ===
Shahmirzad District Population
Administrative Divisions	2011	2016
Chashm RD	2,183	1,659
Poshtkuh RD	5,717	3,844
Shahmirzad (city)	8,882	11,191
Total	16,782	16,694
RD = Rural District
