= Mehdishahr County =

County in Semnan province, Iran

Mehdishahr County Persian: شهرستان مهدی‌شهر
- County
- Location of Mehdishahr County in Semnan Province (left, green)

- Location of Semnan Province in Iran
- Coordinates: 35°52′N 53°27′E
- Country: Iran
- Province: Semnan
- Established: 2007
- Capital: Mehdishahr
- Districts: Central, Shahmirzad

Population (2016)
  - Total: 47,475
- Time zone: UTC+3:30 (IRST)

Mehdishahr County (Persian: شهرستان مهدی‌شهر) is in Semnan province, Iran. Its capital is the city of Mehdishahr.

== History ==
In 2007, Mehdishahr District was separated from Semnan County in the establishment of Mehdishahr County, which was divided into two districts and three rural districts, with Mehdishahr as its capital.

== Demographics ==
=== Population ===
At the time of the 2011 census, the county's population was 41,896 people in 11,997 households. The 2016 census measured the population of the county as 47,475 in 15,226 households.

=== Administrative divisions ===
Mehdishahr County's population history and administrative structure over two consecutive censuses are shown in the following table.

Mehdishahr County Population
Administrative Divisions	2011	2016
Central District	25,114	30,781
Darjazin RD	296	299
Darjazin (city) (Note: Became a city after the 2006 census)	4,964	5,997
Mehdishahr (city)	19,854	24,485
Shahmirzad District	16,782	16,694
Chashm RD	2,183	1,659
Poshtkuh RD	5,717	3,844
Shahmirzad (city)	8,882	11,191
Total	41,896	47,475
RD = Rural District
