= Mehdishahr District =

Former district in Semnan province, Iran

Mehdishahr District Persian: بخش مهدی‌شهر
- Former District
- Location within Iran
- Coordinates: 35°52′N 53°27′E
- Country: Iran
- Province: Semnan
- County: Semnan
- Capital: Mehdishahr

Population (2006)
  - Total: 36,093
- Time zone: UTC+3:30 (IRST)

Mehdishahr District (Persian: بخش مهدی‌شهر) is a former administrative division of Semnan County, Semnan province, Iran. Its capital was the city of Mehdishahr.

== History ==
In 2007, the district was separated from the county in the establishment of Mehdishahr County.

== Demographics ==
=== Population ===
At the time of the 2006 National Census, the district's population was 36,093 in 9,573 households.

=== Administrative divisions ===
Mehdishahr District Population
| Administrative Divisions | 2006 |
|---|---|
| Chashm RD | 6,414 |
| Poshtkuh RD | 1,825 |
| Mehdishahr (city) | 20,581 |
| Shahmirzad (city) | 7,273 |
| Total | 36,093 |
RD = Rural District
