= Sheykh Ahmad, Ardabil =

Village in Ardabil province, Iran

Sheykh Ahmad Persian: شيخ احمد
- Village
- Location within Iran
- Coordinates: 38°23′40″N 48°04′02″E
- Country: Iran
- Province: Ardabil
- County: Ardabil
- District: Samarin
- Rural District: Dujaq

Population (2016)
  - Total: 615
- Time zone: UTC+3:30 (IRST)

Sheykh Ahmad (Persian: شيخ احمد) (Note: Also romanized as Sheykh Aḩmad) is a village in Dujaq Rural District of Samarin District in Ardabil County, Ardabil province, Iran.

== Demographics ==
=== Population ===
At the time of the 2006 National Census, the village's population was 731 in 136 households, when it was in Gharbi Rural District of the Central District. The following census in 2011 counted 673 people in 146 households. by which time the rural district had been separated from the district in the formation of Samarin District. The village was transferred to Dujaq Rural District created in the new district. The 2016 census measured the population of the village as 615 people in 196 households.
