= Gendishmin =

Village in Ardabil province, Iran

Gendishmin Persian: گنديشمين
- Village
- Location within Iran
- Coordinates: 38°25′36″N 48°02′05″E
- Country: Iran
- Province: Ardabil
- County: Ardabil
- District: Samarin
- Rural District: Dujaq

Population (2016)
  - Total: 763
- Time zone: UTC+3:30 (IRST)

Gendishmin (Persian: گنديشمين) (Note: Also romanized as Gendīshmīn) is a village in Dujaq Rural District of Samarin District in Ardabil County, Ardabil province, Iran.

== Demographics ==
=== Population ===
At the time of the 2006 National Census, the village's population was 1,034 in 206 households, when it was in Gharbi Rural District of the Central District. The following census in 2011 counted 856 people in 221 households. by which time the rural district had been separated from the district in the formation of Samarin District. The village was transferred to Dujaq Rural District created in the new district. The 2016 census measured the population of the village as 763 people in 240 households. Gendishmin was the most populous village in its rural district.
