= Mijandi =

Village in Ardabil province, Iran

Mijandi Persian: ميجندي
- Village
- Location within Iran
- Coordinates: 38°25′38″N 48°09′07″E
- Country: Iran
- Province: Ardabil
- County: Ardabil
- District: Samarin
- Rural District: Dujaq

Population (2016)
  - Total: 454
- Time zone: UTC+3:30 (IRST)

Mijandi (Persian: ميجندي) (Note: Also romanized as Mījandī; also known as Mejandeh and Mejandī) is a village in Dujaq Rural District of Samarin District in Ardabil County, Ardabil province, Iran.

== Demographics ==
=== Population ===
At the time of the 2006 National Census, the village's population was 681 in 151 households, when it was in Gharbi Rural District of the Central District. The following census in 2011 counted 615 people in 163 households. by which time the rural district had been separated from the district in the formation of Samarin District. The village was transferred to Dujaq Rural District created in the new district. The 2016 census measured the population of the village as 454 people in 133 households.
