= Taqi Kandi, Ardabil =

Village in Ardabil province, Iran

Taqi Kandi Persian: تقي كندي
- Village
- Location within Iran
- Country: Iran
- Province: Ardabil
- County: Ardabil
- District: Samarin
- Rural District: Dujaq

Population (2016)
  - Total: Below reporting threshold
- Time zone: UTC+3:30 (IRST)

Taqi Kandi (Persian: تقي كندي) (Note: Also romanized as Taqī Kandī; also known as Mīāndraq (مياندرق)) is a village in Dujaq Rural District of Samarin District in Ardabil County, Ardabil province, Iran.

== Demographics ==
=== Population ===
At the time of the 2006 National Census, the village's population was 54 in 18 households, when it was in Gharbi Rural District of the Central District. The following census in 2011 showed a population below the reporting threshold. by which time the rural district had been separated from the district in the formation of Samarin District. The village was transferred to Dujaq Rural District created in the new district. The 2016 census also measured the population of Taqi Kandi as below the reporting threshold.
