= Abr Bakuh =

Village in Ardabil province, Iran

Abr Bakuh Persian: ابربكوه
- Village
- Location within Iran
- Coordinates: 38°22′00″N 48°06′19″E
- Country: Iran
- Province: Ardabil
- County: Ardabil
- District: Samarin
- Rural District: Dujaq

Population (2016)
  - Total: 204
- Time zone: UTC+3:30 (IRST)

Abr Bakuh (Persian: ابربكوه) (Note: Also romanized as Abr Bakūh; also known as Abrbakoo and Īrebkū) is a village in Dujaq Rural District of Samarin District in Ardabil County, Ardabil province, Iran.

== Demographics ==
=== Population ===
At the time of the 2006 National Census, the village's population was 211 in 37 households, when it was in Gharbi Rural District of the Central District. The following census in 2011 counted 211 people in 53 households. by which time the rural district had been separated from the district in the formation of Samarin District. The village was transferred to Dujaq Rural District created in the new district. The 2016 census measured the population of the village as 204 people in 63 households.
