= Kulan Kuh =

Village in Ardabil province, Iran

Kulan Kuh Persian: كولانكوه
- Village
- Location within Iran
- Coordinates: 38°22′52″N 48°05′57″E
- Country: Iran
- Province: Ardabil
- County: Ardabil
- District: Samarin
- Rural District: Dujaq

Population (2016)
  - Total: 432
- Time zone: UTC+3:30 (IRST)

Kulan Kuh (Persian: كولانكوه) (Note: Also romanized as Kūlān Kūh; also known as Kalān Kūh) is a village in Dujaq Rural District of Samarin District in Ardabil County, Ardabil province, Iran.

== Demographics ==
=== Population ===
At the time of the 2006 National Census, the village's population was 418 in 87 households, when it was in Gharbi Rural District of the Central District. The following census in 2011 counted 440 people in 113 households. by which time the rural district had been separated from the district in the formation of Samarin District. The village was transferred to Dujaq Rural District created in the new district. The 2016 census measured the population of the village as 432 people in 122 households.
