= Amirabad, Ardabil =

Village in Ardabil province, Iran

Amirabad Persian: اميراباد
- Village
- Location within Iran
- Coordinates: 38°23′49″N 47°59′30″E
- Country: Iran
- Province: Ardabil
- County: Ardabil
- District: Samarin
- Rural District: Dujaq

Population (2016)
  - Total: 14
- Time zone: UTC+3:30 (IRST)

Amirabad (Persian: اميراباد) (Note: Also romanized as Amīrābād) is a village in Dujaq Rural District of Samarin District in Ardabil County, Ardabil province, Iran.

== Demographics ==
=== Population ===
At the time of the 2006 National Census, the village's population was 38 in seven households, when it was in Gharbi Rural District of the Central District. The following census in 2011 counted 20 people in six households. by which time the rural district had been separated from the district in the formation of Samarin District. The village was transferred to Dujaq Rural District created in the new district. The 2016 census measured the population of the village as 14 people in five households.
