= Yengejeh-ye Molla Mohammad Hasan =

Village in Ardabil province, Iran

Yengejeh-ye Molla Mohammad Hasan Persian: ینگجه ملامحمد حسن
- Village
- Location within Iran
- Coordinates: 38°25′50″N 48°07′47″E
- Country: Iran
- Province: Ardabil
- County: Ardabil
- District: Samarin
- Rural District: Dujaq

Population (2016)
  - Total: 616
- Time zone: UTC+3:30 (IRST)

Yengejeh-ye Molla Mohammad Hasan (Persian: ينگجه ملامحمدحسن) (Note: Also romanized as Yengejeh-ye Mollā Moḩammad Ḩasan) is a village in, and the capital of, Dujaq Rural District in Samarin District of Ardabil County, Ardabil province, Iran.

== Demographics ==
=== Population ===
At the time of the 2006 National Census, the village's population was 822 in 178 households, when it was in Gharbi Rural District of the Central District. The following census in 2011 counted 955 people in 255 households, by which time the village had merged with the village of Ali Qeshlaqi. The rural district was separated from the district in the formation of Samarin District, and Yengejeh-ye Molla Mohammad Hasan was transferred to Dujaq Rural District created in the new district. The 2016 census measured the population of the village as 616 people in 188 households. It was the most populous village in its rural district.
