= Ravindazaq =

Village in Ardabil province, Iran

Ravindazaq Persian: رويندزق
- Village
- Location within Iran
- Coordinates: 38°26′23″N 48°04′48″E
- Country: Iran
- Province: Ardabil
- County: Ardabil
- District: Samarin
- Rural District: Dujaq

Population (2016)
  - Total: 227
- Time zone: UTC+3:30 (IRST)

Ravindazaq (Persian: رويندزق) (Note: Also romanized as Ravīndazaq; also known as Qūnāq Qerān and Ravīndūzaq) is a village in Dujaq Rural District of Samarin District in Ardabil County, Ardabil province, Iran.

== Demographics ==
=== Population ===
At the time of the 2006 National Census, the village's population was 297 in 60 households, when it was in Gharbi Rural District of the Central District. The following census in 2011 counted 224 people in 54 households. by which time the rural district had been separated from the district in the formation of Samarin District. The village was transferred to Dujaq Rural District created in the new district. The 2016 census measured the population of the village as 227 people in 55 households.
