= Shender Shami =

Village in Ardabil province, Iran

Shender Shami Persian: شندرشامي
- Village
- Location within Iran
- Coordinates: 38°23′25″N 48°01′24″E
- Country: Iran
- Province: Ardabil
- County: Ardabil
- District: Samarin
- Rural District: Dujaq

Population (2016)
  - Total: 131
- Time zone: UTC+3:30 (IRST)

Shender Shami (Persian: شندرشامي) (Note: Also romanized as Shender Shāmī) is a village in Dujaq Rural District of Samarin District in Ardabil County, Ardabil province, Iran.

== Demographics ==
=== Population ===
At the time of the 2006 National Census, the village's population was 176 in 33 households, when it was in Gharbi Rural District of the Central District. The following census in 2011 counted 158 people in 32 households. by which time the rural district had been separated from the district in the formation of Samarin District. The village was transferred to Dujaq Rural District created in the new district. The 2016 census measured the population of the village as 131 people in 35 households.
