= Charapa =

Village in Ardabil province, Iran

Charapa Persian: چراپا
- Village
- Location within Iran
- Country: Iran
- Province: Ardabil
- County: Ardabil
- District: Samarin
- Rural District: Dujaq

Population (2016)
  - Total: 34
- Time zone: UTC+3:30 (IRST)

Charapa (Persian: چراپا) (Note: Also romanized as Charāpā) is a village in Dujaq Rural District of Samarin District in Ardabil County, Ardabil province, Iran.

== Demographics ==
=== Population ===
At the time of the 2006 National Census, the village's population was 42 in 11 households, when it was in Gharbi Rural District of the Central District. The following census in 2011 counted 16 people in five households. by which time the rural district had been separated from the district in the formation of Samarin District. The village was transferred to Dujaq Rural District created in the new district. The 2016 census measured the population of the village as 34 people in 10 households.
