= Mirani =

Mirani may refer to:

== Places ==
=== Australia ===
- Mirani, Queensland
  - Electoral district of Mirani
  - Shire of Mirani

=== Oman ===
- Fort Al-Mirani, a fort in the harbour of the city of Old Muscat

=== Pakistan ===
- Mirani, Balochistan
- Mirani, Sindh
- Mirani Dam, a dam on the Kech River, Balochistan province

=== Iran ===
- Marani, Iran
- Mirani, Iran

== Other uses ==
- Mirani (clan), a tribe in Balochistan, Sindh, and Punjab, part of the Dodai
- Mirani (rapper), South Korean rapper
