= Ali Qeshlaqi, Ardabil =

Neighborhood in Ardabil province, Iran

Ali Qeshlaqi Persian: علي قشلاقي
- Neighborhood
- Location within Iran
- Coordinates: 38°25′48″N 48°07′31″E
- Country: Iran
- Province: Ardabil
- County: Ardabil
- District: Central
- Rural District: Gharbi
- Village: Yengejeh-ye Molla Mohammad Hasan

Population (2006)
  - Total: 314
- Time zone: UTC+3:30 (IRST)

Ali Qeshlaqi (Persian: علي قشلاقي) (Note: Also romanized as ‘Alī Qeshlāqī; also known as ‘Alī Qeshlāq) is a neighborhood in the village of Yengejeh-ye Molla Mohammad Hasan in Gharbi Rural District of the Central District of Ardabil County, Ardabil province, Iran.

== Demographics ==
=== Population ===
At the time of the 2006 National Census, Ali Qeshlaqi's population was 314 in 68 households, when it was a village in Gharbi Rural District.

In 2010, the rural district was separated from the district in the formation of Samarin District and Ali Qeshlaqi merged with the village of Yengejeh-ye Molla Mohammad Hasan.
