= Hamlabad =

Village in Ardabil province, Iran

Hamlabad Persian: حمل اباد
- Village
- Location within Iran
- Coordinates: 38°15′32″N 48°12′01″E
- Country: Iran
- Province: Ardabil
- County: Ardabil
- District: Central
- Rural District: Sardabeh

Population (2016)
  - Total: 1,191
- Time zone: UTC+3:30 (IRST)

Hamlabad (Persian: حمل اباد) (Note: Also romanized as Ḩamlābād) is a village in Sardabeh Rural District of the Central District in Ardabil County, Ardabil province, Iran.

== Demographics ==
=== Population ===
At the time of the 2006 National Census, the village's population was 1,041 in 227 households. The following census in 2011 counted 1,069 people in 265 households. The 2016 census measured the population of the village as 1,191 people in 323 households.
