= Tazeh Kand-e Mohammadiyeh =

Village in Ardabil province, Iran

Tazeh Kand-e Mohammadiyeh Persian: تازه كندمحمديه
- Village
- Location within Iran
- Coordinates: 38°24′11″N 48°08′32″E
- Country: Iran
- Province: Ardabil
- County: Ardabil
- District: Samarin
- Rural District: Gharbi

Population (2016)
  - Total: 96
- Time zone: UTC+3:30 (IRST)

Tazeh Kand-e Mohammadiyeh (Persian: تازه كندمحمديه) (Note: Also romanized as Tāzeh Kand-e Moḩammadīyeh) is a village in Gharbi Rural District of Samarin District in Ardabil County, Ardabil province, Iran.

== Demographics ==
=== Population ===
At the time of the 2006 National Census, the village's population was 136 in 28 households. The following census in 2011 counted 119 people in 30 households, by which time the rural district had been separated from the district in the formation of Samarin District. The 2016 census measured the population of the village as 96 people in 28 households.
