= Chanzanaq =

Village in Ardabil province, Iran

Chanzanaq Persian: چنذانق
- Village
- Location within Iran
- Coordinates: 38°16′23″N 48°20′45″E
- Country: Iran
- Province: Ardabil
- County: Ardabil
- District: Central
- Rural District: Sharqi

Population (2016)
  - Total: 606
- Time zone: UTC+3:30 (IRST)

Chanzanaq (Persian: چنذانق) (Note: Also romanized as Chanz̄ānaq) is a village in Sharqi Rural District of the Central District in Ardabil County, Ardabil province, Iran.

== Demographics ==
=== Population ===
At the time of the 2006 National Census, the village's population was 728 in 144 households. The following census in 2011 counted 751 people in 203 households. The 2016 census measured the population of the village as 606 people in 181 households.
