= Aq Bolagh-e Aqajan Khan =

Village in Ardabil province, Iran

Aq Bolagh-e Aqajan Khan Persian: اقبلاغ اقاجان خان
- Village
- Location within Iran
- Coordinates: 38°16′22″N 48°21′07″E
- Country: Iran
- Province: Ardabil
- County: Ardabil
- District: Central
- Rural District: Sharqi

Population (2016)
  - Total: 1,305
- Time zone: UTC+3:30 (IRST)

Aq Bolagh-e Aqajan Khan (Persian: اقبلاغ اقاجان خان) (Note: Also romanized as Āq Bolāgh-e Āqājān Khān; also known as Āgh Bolāgh (آغ بُلاغ), Āgh Bolāgh-e Moşţafá Khān (آغ بُلاغِ مُصطَفَى خان), and Āq Bolāgh-e Āqājān (آق بُلاغِ آقاجان)) is a village in Sharqi Rural District of the Central District in Ardabil County, Ardabil province, Iran.

== Demographics ==
=== Population ===
At the time of the 2006 National Census, the village's population was 1,802 in 384 households. The following census in 2011 counted 1,620 people in 445 households. The 2016 census measured the population of the village as 1,305 people in 412 households.
