= Gilan Deh, Ardabil =

Village in Ardabil province, Iran

Gilan Deh Persian: گيلان ده
- Village
- Location within Iran
- Coordinates: 38°18′44″N 48°22′02″E
- Country: Iran
- Province: Ardabil
- County: Ardabil
- District: Central
- Rural District: Kalkhuran

Population (2016)
  - Total: 909
- Time zone: UTC+3:30 (IRST)

Gilan Deh (Persian: گيلان ده) (Note: Also romanized as Gīlān Deh and Gīlāndeh) is a village in Kalkhuran Rural District of the Central District in Ardabil County, Ardabil province, Iran.

== Demographics ==
=== Population ===
At the time of the 2006 National Census, the village's population was 877 in 241 households. The following census in 2011 counted 903 people in 281 households. The 2016 census measured the population of the village as 909 people in 303 households.
