= Pir Aquam =

Village in Ardabil province, Iran

Pir Aquam Persian: پيراقوم
- Village
- Location within Iran
- Coordinates: 38°12′17″N 48°24′23″E
- Country: Iran
- Province: Ardabil
- County: Ardabil
- District: Central
- Rural District: Sharqi

Population (2016)
  - Total: 1,196
- Time zone: UTC+3:30 (IRST)

Pir Aquam (Persian: پيراقوم) (Note: Also romanized as Pīr Aqūām and Pīr Aqowām; also known as Pīr Aqūn) is a village in Sharqi Rural District of the Central District in Ardabil County, Ardabil province, Iran.

== Demographics ==
=== Population ===
At the time of the 2006 National Census, the village's population was 1,569 in 307 households. The following census in 2011 counted 1,297 people in 335 households. The 2016 census measured the population of the village as 1,196 people in 306 households.
