= Taleb Qeshlaqi =

Village in Ardabil province, Iran

Taleb Qeshlaqi Persian: طالب قشلاقي
- Village
- Location within Iran
- Coordinates: 38°24′16″N 48°12′12″E
- Country: Iran
- Province: Ardabil
- County: Ardabil
- District: Central
- Rural District: Arshaq-e Sharqi

Population (2016)
  - Total: 1,409
- Time zone: UTC+3:30 (IRST)

Taleb Qeshlaqi (Persian: طالب قشلاقي) (Note: Also romanized as Ţāleb Qeshlāqī) is a village in Arshaq-e Sharqi Rural District of the Central District in Ardabil County, Ardabil province, Iran.

== Demographics ==
=== Population ===
At the time of the 2006 National Census, the village's population was 2,140 in 408 households. The following census in 2011 counted 1,822 people in 482 households. The 2016 census measured the population of the village as 1,409 people in 400 households. It was the most populous village in its rural district.
