= Dijujin =

Village in Ardabil province, Iran

Dijujin Persian: ديجوجين
- Village
- Location within Iran
- Coordinates: 38°17′37″N 48°09′31″E
- Country: Iran
- Province: Ardabil
- County: Ardabil
- District: Central
- Rural District: Sardabeh

Population (2016)
  - Total: 1,100
- Time zone: UTC+3:30 (IRST)

Dijujin (Persian: ديجوجين) (Note: Also romanized as Dījūjīn; also known as Vījūjīn) is a village in Sardabeh Rural District of the Central District in Ardabil County, Ardabil province, Iran.

== Demographics ==
=== Population ===
At the time of the 2006 National Census, the village's population was 1,144 in 274 households. The following census in 2011 counted 1,233 people in 345 households. The 2016 census measured the population of the village as 1,100 people in 348 households.
