= Dujaq Rural District =

Rural district in Ardabil province, Iran

Dujaq Rural District Persian: دهستان دوجاق
- Rural District
- Location within Iran
- Coordinates: 38°25′N 48°04′E
- Country: Iran
- Province: Ardabil
- County: Ardabil
- District: Samarin
- Established: 2010
- Capital: Yengejeh-ye Molla Mohammad Hasan

Population (2016)
  - Total: 3,535
- Time zone: UTC+3:30 (IRST)

Dujaq Rural District (Persian: دهستان دوجاق) is in Samarin District of Ardabil County, Ardabil province, Iran. Its capital is the village of Yengejeh-ye Molla Mohammad Hasan.

== History ==
In 2010, Gharbi Rural District was separated from the Central District in the formation of Samarin District, and Dujaq Rural District was created in the new district.

== Demographics ==
=== Population ===
At the time of the 2011 National Census, the rural district's population was 4,186 inhabitants in 1,054 households. The 2016 census measured the population of the rural district as 3,535 in 1,063 households. The most populous of its 16 villages was Gendishmin, with 763 people.

=== Other villages in the rural district ===
- Abr Bakuh
- Amirabad
- Charapa
- Kulan Kuh
- Mijandi
- Ravindazaq
- Shender Shami
- Sheykh Ahmad
- Taqi Kandi
