= Khvajeh Bolaghi =

Village in Ardabil province, Iran

Khvajeh Bolaghi Persian: خواجه بلاغي
- Village
- Location within Iran
- Coordinates: 38°36′29″N 48°16′49″E
- Country: Iran
- Province: Ardabil
- County: Ardabil
- District: Central
- Rural District: Arshaq-e Sharqi

Population (2016)
  - Total: 255
- Time zone: UTC+3:30 (IRST)

Khvajeh Bolaghi (Persian: خواجه بلاغي) (Note: Also romanized as Khvājeh Bolāghī; also known as Khājeh Bolāgh and Khvājeh Bolāgh) is a village in Arshaq-e Sharqi Rural District of the Central District in Ardabil County, Ardabil province, Iran.

== Demographics ==
=== Population ===
At the time of the 2006 National Census, the village's population was 370 in 86 households. The following census in 2011 counted 261 people in 70 households. The 2016 census measured the population of the village as 255 people in 76 households.
