= Goli, Ardabil =

Village in Ardabil province, Iran

Goli Persian: گلي
- Village
- Location within Iran
- Coordinates: 38°08′58″N 48°14′30″E
- Country: Iran
- Province: Ardabil
- County: Ardabil
- District: Central
- Rural District: Balghelu

Population (2016)
  - Total: 163
- Time zone: UTC+3:30 (IRST)

Goli (Persian: گلي) (Note: Also romanized as Golī; also known as Gūlī and Kolī) is a village in Balghelu Rural District of the Central District in Ardabil County, Ardabil province, Iran.

== Demographics ==
=== Population ===
At the time of the 2006 National Census, the village's population was 211 in 56 households. The following census in 2011 counted 172 people in 43 households. The 2016 census measured the population of the village as 163 people in 54 households.
