= Taqi Dizaj =

Village in Ardabil province, Iran

Taqi Dizaj Persian: تقي ديزج
- Village
- Location within Iran
- Coordinates: 38°29′22″N 48°16′26″E
- Country: Iran
- Province: Ardabil
- County: Ardabil
- District: Central
- Rural District: Arshaq-e Sharqi

Population (2016)
  - Total: 251
- Time zone: UTC+3:30 (IRST)

Taqi Dizaj (Persian: تقي ديزج) (Note: Also romanized as Taqī Dīzaj; also known as Nagdīzsī and Taqī Dīzeh (تقی ديزه)) is a village in, and the capital of, Arshaq-e Sharqi Rural District in the Central District of Ardabil County, Ardabil province, Iran.

== Demographics ==
=== Population ===
At the time of the 2006 National Census, the village's population was 415 in 91 households. The following census in 2011 counted 326 people in 90 households. The 2016 census measured the population of the village as 251 people in 73 households.
