= Dalikli Dash =

Village in Ardabil province, Iran

Dalikli Dash Persian: دليكلي داش
- Village
- Location within Iran
- Coordinates: 38°35′14″N 48°18′08″E
- Country: Iran
- Province: Ardabil
- County: Ardabil
- District: Central
- Rural District: Arshaq-e Sharqi

Population (2016)
  - Total: 19
- Time zone: UTC+3:30 (IRST)

Dalikli Dash (Persian: دليكلي داش) (Note: Also romanized as Dalīklī Dāsh; also known as Dalīlaklīdāsh) is a village in Arshaq-e Sharqi Rural District of the Central District in Ardabil County, Ardabil province, Iran.

== Demographics ==
=== Population ===
At the time of the 2006 National Census, the village's population was 54 in 16 households. The following census in 2011 counted 33 people in eight households. The 2016 census measured the population of the village as 19 people in seven households.
