= Karkaraq =

Village in Ardabil province, Iran

Karkaraq Persian: كركرق
- Village
- Location within Iran
- Coordinates: 38°19′44″N 48°21′12″E
- Country: Iran
- Province: Ardabil
- County: Ardabil
- District: Central
- Rural District: Kalkhuran

Population (2016)
  - Total: 1,346
- Time zone: UTC+3:30 (IRST)

Karkaraq (Persian: كركرق) is a village in Kalkhuran Rural District of the Central District in Ardabil County, Ardabil province, Iran.

== Demographics ==
=== Population ===
At the time of the 2006 National Census, the village's population was 1,393 in 308 households. The following census in 2011 counted 1,405 people in 380 households. The 2016 census measured the population of the village as 1,346 people in 409 households.
