= Baruq, Ardabil =

Village in Ardabil province, Iran

Baruq Persian: باروق
- Village
- Location within Iran
- Coordinates: 38°18′04″N 48°10′13″E
- Country: Iran
- Province: Ardabil
- County: Ardabil
- District: Central
- Rural District: Sardabeh

Population (2016)
  - Total: 889
- Time zone: UTC+3:30 (IRST)

Baruq (Persian: باروق) (Note: Also romanized as Bārūq) is a village in Sardabeh Rural District of the Central District in Ardabil County, Ardabil province, Iran.

== Demographics ==
=== Population ===
At the time of the 2006 National Census, the village's population was 1,065 in 272 households. The following census in 2011 counted 934 people in 267 households. The 2016 census measured the population of the village as 889 people in 279 households.
