= Aqa Baqer =

Village in Ardabil province, Iran

Aqa Baqer Persian: اقاباقر
- Village
- Location within Iran
- Coordinates: 38°14′40″N 48°22′35″E
- Country: Iran
- Province: Ardabil
- County: Ardabil
- District: Central
- Rural District: Sharqi

Population (2016)
  - Total: 1,229
- Time zone: UTC+3:30 (IRST)

Aqa Baqer (Persian: اقاباقر) (Note: Also romanized as Āqā Bāqer; also known as Qaşşāb Tappeh) is a village in Sharqi Rural District of the Central District in Ardabil County, Ardabil province, Iran.

== Demographics ==
=== Population ===
At the time of the 2006 National Census, the village's population was 1,266 in 316 households. The following census in 2011 counted 1,353 people in 381 households. The 2016 census measured the population of the village as 1,229 people in 363 households.
