= Bayram Badani =

Village in Ardabil province, Iran

Bayram Badani Persian: بايرام بدني
- Village
- Location within Iran
- Coordinates: 38°28′29″N 48°14′56″E
- Country: Iran
- Province: Ardabil
- County: Ardabil
- District: Central
- Rural District: Arshaq-e Sharqi

Population (2016)
  - Total: 38
- Time zone: UTC+3:30 (IRST)

Bayram Badani (Persian: بايرام بدني) (Note: Also romanized as Bāyrām Badanī; also known as Bāyrām Badan) is a village in Arshaq-e Sharqi Rural District of the Central District in Ardabil County, Ardabil province, Iran.

== Demographics ==
=== Population ===
At the time of the 2006 National Census, the village's population was 103 in 21 households. The following census in 2011 counted 50 people in 11 households. The 2016 census measured the population of the village as 38 people in 11 households.
