= Allahlu, Ardabil =

Village in Ardabil province, Iran

Allahlu Persian: لله لو
- Village
- Location within Iran
- Coordinates: 38°29′33″N 48°11′32″E
- Country: Iran
- Province: Ardabil
- County: Ardabil
- District: Central
- Rural District: Arshaq-e Sharqi

Population (2016)
  - Total: 143
- Time zone: UTC+3:30 (IRST)

Allahlu (Persian: لله لو) (Note: Also romanized as Allahlū; also known as Lalahlū) is a village in Arshaq-e Sharqi Rural District of the Central District in Ardabil County, Ardabil province, Iran.

== Demographics ==
=== Population ===
At the time of the 2006 National Census, the village's population was 255 in 49 households. The following census in 2011 counted 204 people in 54 households. The 2016 census measured the population of the village as 143 people in 34 households.
