= Chenaqrud =

Village in Ardabil province, Iran

Chenaqrud Persian: چناقرود
- Village
- Location within Iran
- Coordinates: 38°17′51″N 48°07′16″E
- Country: Iran
- Province: Ardabil
- County: Ardabil
- District: Central
- Rural District: Sardabeh

Population (2016)
  - Total: 2,348
- Time zone: UTC+3:30 (IRST)

Chenaqrud (Persian: چناقرود) (Note: Also romanized as Chenāqrūd; also known as Chenāqerd, Chenaq Bolagh, Ḩanāqerd, Janāqrūd, Jenagherd, Jenāqerd, and Jinakart) is a village in Sardabeh Rural District of the Central District in Ardabil County, Ardabil province, Iran.

== Demographics ==
=== Population ===
At the time of the 2006 National Census, the village's population was 2,480 in 569 households. The following census in 2011 counted 2,577 people in 673 households. The 2016 census measured the population of the village as 2,348 people in 678 households.
