= Khiarak =

Village in Ardabil province, Iran

Khiarak Persian: خيارك
- Village
- Location within Iran
- Coordinates: 38°19′28″N 48°06′11″E
- Country: Iran
- Province: Ardabil
- County: Ardabil
- District: Central
- Rural District: Sardabeh

Population (2016)
  - Total: 3,287
- Time zone: UTC+3:30 (IRST)

Khiarak (Persian: خيارك) (Note: Also romanized as Khīārak and Khīyārak; also known as Kūnsūr; and Turkish: Khiarai and Xiarai) is a village in Sardabeh Rural District of the Central District in Ardabil County, Ardabil province, Iran.

== Demographics ==
=== Population ===
At the time of the 2006 National Census, the village's population was 3,183 in 709 households. The following census in 2011 counted 3,353 people in 851 households. The 2016 census measured the population of the village as 3,287 people in 886 households. It was the most populous village in its rural district.
