= Jamadi =

Village in Ardabil province, Iran

Jamadi Persian: جمادي
- Village
- Location within Iran
- Coordinates: 38°17′22″N 48°05′08″E
- Country: Iran
- Province: Ardabil
- County: Ardabil
- District: Central
- Rural District: Sardabeh

Population (2016)
  - Total: 328
- Time zone: UTC+3:30 (IRST)

Jamadi (Persian: جمادي) (Note: Also romanized as Jamādī) is a village in Sardabeh Rural District of the Central District in Ardabil County, Ardabil province, Iran.

== Demographics ==
=== Population ===
At the time of the 2006 National Census, the village's population was 357 in 66 households. The following census in 2011 counted 325 people in 76 households. The 2016 census measured the population of the village as 328 people in 95 households.
