= Kord Qeshlaqi =

Village in Ardabil province, Iran

Kord Gheshlaghi Persian: كردقشلاقي
- Village
- Location within Iran
- Coordinates: 38°23′14″N 48°10′30″E
- Country: Iran
- Province: Ardabil
- County: Ardabil
- District: Samarin
- Rural District: Gharbi

Population (2016)
  - Total: 235
- Time zone: UTC+3:30 (IRST)

Kord (Persian: كردقشلاقي) (Note: Also romanized as Kord Gheshlaghi; also known as Kurd Gheshlaghi) is a village in Gharbi Rural District of Samarin District in Ardabil County, Ardabil province, Iran.

== Demographics ==
=== Population ===
At the time of the 2006 National Census, the village's population was 405 in 89 households. The following census in 2011 counted 325 people in 71 households, by which time the rural district had been separated from the district in the formation of Samarin District. The 2016 census measured the population of the village as 235 people in 58 households.
