= Shamshir Khaneh =

Village in Ardabil province, Iran

Shamshir Khaneh Persian: شمشيرخانه
- Village
- Location within Iran
- Coordinates: 38°16′11″N 48°00′41″E
- Country: Iran
- Province: Ardabil
- County: Ardabil
- District: Central
- Rural District: Sardabeh

Population (2016)
  - Total: Below reporting threshold
- Time zone: UTC+3:30 (IRST)

Shamshir Khaneh (Persian: شمشيرخانه) (Note: Also romanized as Shamshīr Khāneh; also known as Shamshīr Khānī) is a village in Sardabeh Rural District of the Central District in Ardabil County, Ardabil province, Iran.

== Demographics ==
=== Population ===
At the time of the 2006 National Census, the village's population was 37 in seven households. The 2011 and 2016 censuses measured the population of the village as below the reporting threshold.
