= Hasan Baruq =

Village in Ardabil province, Iran

Hasan Baruq Persian: حسن باروق
- Village
- Location within Iran
- Coordinates: 38°14′32″N 48°13′29″E
- Country: Iran
- Province: Ardabil
- County: Ardabil
- District: Central
- Rural District: Balghelu

Population (2016)
  - Total: 648
- Time zone: UTC+3:30 (IRST)

Hasan Baruq (Persian: حسن باروق) (Note: Also romanized as Ḩasan Bārūq) is a village in Balghelu Rural District of the Central District in Ardabil County, Ardabil province, Iran.

== Demographics ==
=== Population ===
At the time of the 2006 National Census, the village's population was 621 in 157 households. The following census in 2011 counted 732 people in 203 households. The 2016 census measured the population of the village as 648 people in 180 households.
