= Aq Bolagh-e Rostam Khani =

Village in Ardabil province, Iran

Aq Bolagh-e Rostam Khani Persian: اقبلاغ رستم خاني
- Village
- Location within Iran
- Coordinates: 38°13′59″N 48°25′56″E
- Country: Iran
- Province: Ardabil
- County: Ardabil
- District: Central
- Rural District: Sharqi

Population (2016)
  - Total: 1,929
- Time zone: UTC+3:30 (IRST)

Aq Bolagh-e Rostam Khani (Persian: اقبلاغ رستم خاني) (Note: Also romanized as Āq Bolāgh-e Rostam Khānī; also known as Āq Bolāgh-e Rostam Khān) is a village in Sharqi Rural District of the Central District in Ardabil County, Ardabil province, Iran.

== Demographics ==
=== Population ===
At the time of the 2006 National Census, the village's population was 1,827 in 372 households. The following census in 2011 counted 1,945 people in 582 households. The 2016 census measured the population of the village as 1,929 people in 605 households. It was the most populous village in its rural district.
