= Soltanabad, Ardabil =

Village in Ardabil province, Iran

Soltanabad Persian: سلطان اباد
- Village
- Location within Iran
- Coordinates: 38°17′53″N 48°21′10″E
- Country: Iran
- Province: Ardabil
- County: Ardabil
- District: Central
- Rural District: Kalkhuran

Population (2016)
  - Total: 1,830
- Time zone: UTC+3:30 (IRST)

Soltanabad (Persian: سلطان اباد) (Note: Also romanized as Solţānābād) is a village in Kalkhuran Rural District of the Central District in Ardabil County, Ardabil province, Iran.

== Demographics ==
=== Population ===
At the time of the 2006 National Census, the village's population was 1,752 in 368 households. The following census in 2011 counted 1,857 people in 452 households. The 2016 census measured the population of the village as 1,830 people in 528 households. It was the most populous village in its rural district.
