= Sowmaeh, Ardabil =

Village in Ardabil province, Iran

Sowmaeh Persian: صومعه
- Village
- Location within Iran
- Coordinates: 38°17′19″N 48°13′57″E
- Country: Iran
- Province: Ardabil
- County: Ardabil
- District: Central
- Rural District: Kalkhuran

Population (2016)
  - Total: 1,282
- Time zone: UTC+3:30 (IRST)

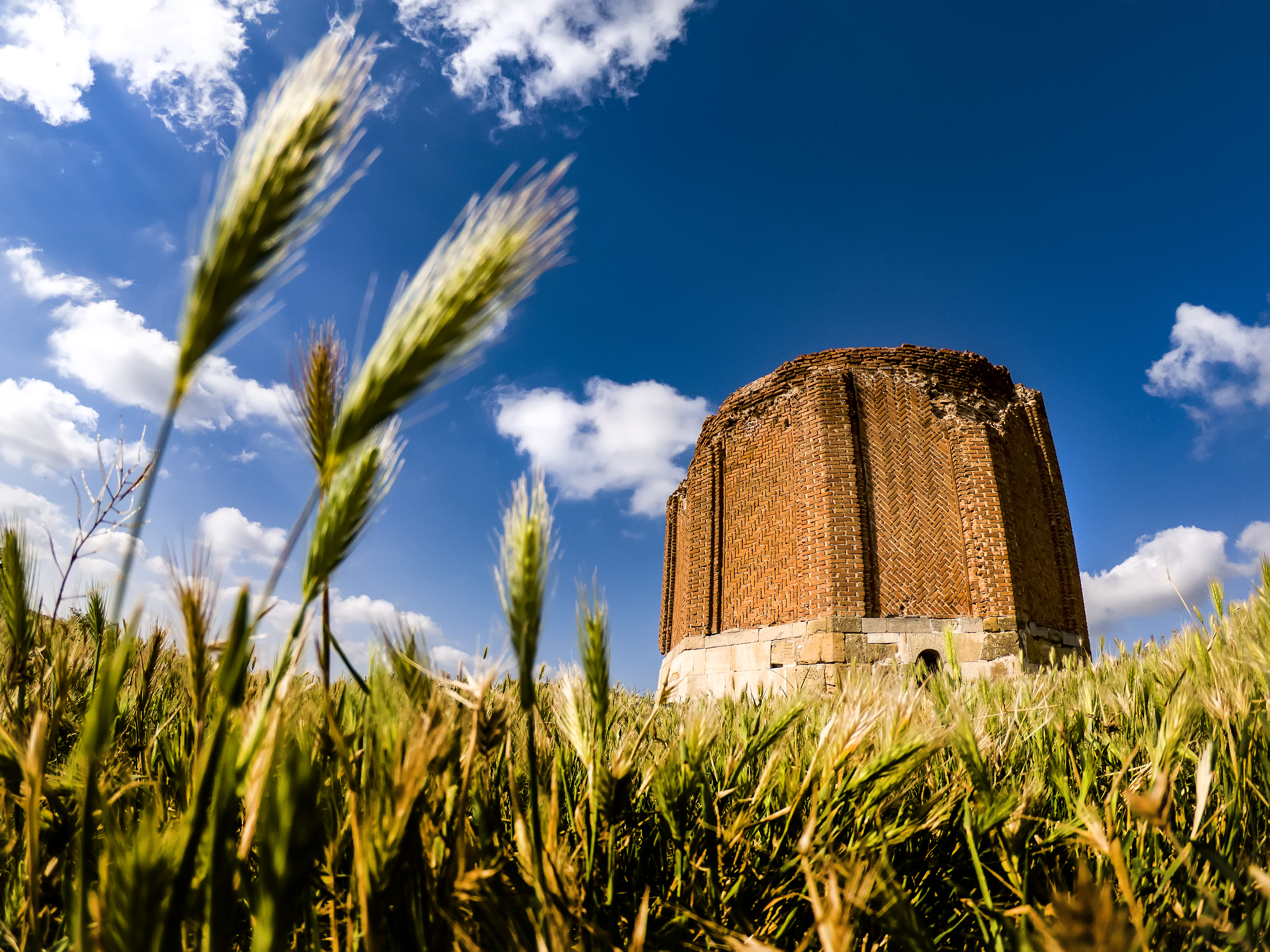
Shater Dome Tower of Ardabi

Sowmaeh (Persian: صومعه) (Note: Also romanized as Şowma‘eh and Şūme‘eh; also known as Şūmā) is a village in Kalkhuran Rural District of the Central District in Ardabil County, Ardabil province, Iran.

== Demographics ==
=== Population ===
At the time of the 2006 National Census, the village's population was 1,368 in 315 households. The following census in 2011 counted 1,316 people in 366 households. The 2016 census measured the population of the village as 1,282 people in 382 households.
