= Kord Kandi, Ardabil =

Village in Ardabil province, Iran

Kord Kandi Persian: كردكندي
- Village
- Location within Iran
- Coordinates: 38°15′32″N 48°05′07″E
- Country: Iran
- Province: Ardabil
- County: Ardabil
- District: Central
- Rural District: Sardabeh

Population (2016)
  - Total: 206
- Time zone: UTC+3:30 (IRST)

Kord Kandi (Persian: كردكندي) (Note: Also romanized as Kord Kandī) is a village in Sardabeh Rural District of the Central District in Ardabil County, Ardabil province, Iran.

== Demographics ==
=== Population ===
At the time of the 2006 National Census, the village's population was 222 in 58 households. The following census in 2011 counted 192 people in 60 households. The 2016 census measured the population of the village as 206 people in 65 households.
