= Tahmasebabad, Ardabil =

Village in Ardabil province, Iran

Tahmasebabad Persian: طهماسب اباد
- Village
- Location within Iran
- Coordinates: 38°32′22″N 48°08′14″E
- Country: Iran
- Province: Ardabil
- County: Ardabil
- District: Central
- Rural District: Arshaq-e Sharqi

Population (2016)
  - Total: 29
- Time zone: UTC+3:30 (IRST)

Tahmasebabad (Persian: طهماسب اباد) (Note: Also romanized as Ţahmāsebābād) is a village in Arshaq-e Sharqi Rural District of the Central District in Ardabil County, Ardabil province, Iran.

== Demographics ==
=== Population ===
At the time of the 2006 National Census, the village's population was 60 in 13 households. The following census in 2011 counted 41 people in 11 households. The 2016 census measured the population of the village as 29 people in seven households.
