= Sorkhanlu =

Village in Ardabil province, Iran

Sorkhanlu Persian: سرخانلو
- Village
- Location within Iran
- Coordinates: 38°32′04″N 48°16′54″E
- Country: Iran
- Province: Ardabil
- County: Ardabil
- District: Central
- Rural District: Arshaq-e Sharqi

Population (2016)
  - Total: 122
- Time zone: UTC+3:30 (IRST)

Sorkhanlu (Persian: سرخانلو) (Note: Also romanized as Sorkhānlū) is a village in Arshaq-e Sharqi Rural District of the Central District in Ardabil County, Ardabil province, Iran.

== Demographics ==
=== Population ===
At the time of the 2006 National Census, the village's population was 215 in 53 households. The following census in 2011 counted 147 people in 42 households. The 2016 census measured the population of the village as 122 people in 35 households.
