= Nuran, Ardabil =

Village in Ardabil province, Iran

Nuran Persian: نوران
- Village
- Location within Iran
- Coordinates: 38°14′04″N 48°11′41″E
- Country: Iran
- Province: Ardabil
- County: Ardabil
- District: Central
- Rural District: Balghelu

Population (2016)
  - Total: 927
- Time zone: UTC+3:30 (IRST)

Nuran (Persian: نوران) (Note: Also romanized as Nūrān) is a village in Balghelu Rural District of the Central District in Ardabil County, Ardabil province, Iran.

== Demographics ==
=== Population ===
At the time of the 2006 National Census, the village's population was 918 in 211 households. The following census in 2011 counted 862 people in 258 households. The 2016 census measured the population of the village as 927 people in 258 households.
