= Amuqin =

Village in Ardabil province, Iran

Amuqin Persian: عموقين
- Village
- Location within Iran
- Coordinates: 38°15′10″N 48°10′32″E
- Country: Iran
- Province: Ardabil
- County: Ardabil
- District: Central
- Rural District: Sardabeh

Population (2016)
  - Total: 1,400
- Time zone: UTC+3:30 (IRST)

Amuqin (Persian: عموقين) (Note: Also romanized as ‘Amūqīn) is a village in Sardabeh Rural District of the Central District in Ardabil County, Ardabil province, Iran.

== Demographics ==
=== Population ===
At the time of the 2006 National Census, the village's population was 1,318 in 265 households. The following census in 2011 counted 1,483 people in 368 households. The 2016 census measured the population of the village as 1,400 people in 387 households.
