= Aski Shahr =

Village in Ardabil province, Iran

Aski Shahr Persian: اسكي شهر
- Village
- Location within Iran
- Coordinates: 38°12′36″N 48°10′52″E
- Country: Iran
- Province: Ardabil
- County: Ardabil
- District: Central
- Rural District: Balghelu

Population (2016)
  - Total: 37
- Time zone: UTC+3:30 (IRST)

Aski Shahr (Persian: اسكي شهر) (Note: Also romanized as Askī Shahr; also known as Ask Shahr) is a village in Balghelu Rural District of the Central District in Ardabil County, Ardabil province, Iran.

== Demographics ==
=== Population ===
At the time of the 2006 National Census, the village's population was 70 in 15 households. The following census in 2011 counted 40 people in 10 households. The 2016 census measured the population of the village as 37 people in nine households.
