= Qarah Tappeh-ye Sabalan =

Village in Ardabil province, Iran

Qarah Tappeh-ye Sabalan Persian: قره‌تپه سبلان
- Village
- Location within Iran
- Coordinates: 38°17′35″N 48°03′42″E
- Country: Iran
- Province: Ardabil
- County: Ardabil
- District: Central
- Rural District: Sardabeh

Population (2016)
  - Total: 833
- Time zone: UTC+3:30 (IRST)

Qarah Tappeh-ye Sabalan (Persian: قره‌تپه سبلان) (Note: Also romanized as Qarah Tappeh-ye Sabalān; also known as Qarah Tappeh) is a village in Sardabeh Rural District of the Central District in Ardabil County, Ardabil province, Iran.

== Demographics ==
=== Population ===
At the time of the 2006 National Census, the village's population was 877 in 174 households. The following census in 2011 counted 937 people in 245 households. The 2016 census measured the population of the village as 833 people in 256 households.
