= Qelichi =

Village in Ardabil province, Iran

Qelichi Persian: قليچي
- Village
- Location within Iran
- Coordinates: 38°06′01″N 48°13′33″E
- Country: Iran
- Province: Ardabil
- County: Ardabil
- District: Central
- Rural District: Balghelu

Population (2016)
  - Total: 73
- Time zone: UTC+3:30 (IRST)

Ghaleychi (Persian: قَلِيچي) (Note: Also romanized as Qal‘ehcheh and Qelīchī) is located 15 kilometers from Ardabil city and its altitude is 1987 meters above sea level.

Ghaleychi or Qale Ichi is a village in Ardabil, a part of the central district, Balghelu Rural District, located in Central District in Ardabil County, Ardabil province, Iran.

This village is more than three hundred years old and therefore, in addition to its natural and tourist value, it also has historical value.

Its original name that has survived was "Qale Ichi", which at that time meant castle owners. The reason for giving this name to this village was the ancient castles that existed in this village.

The inhabitants of Qale Ichi village include eight tribes, which are Agha Mati, Eskandari, Esmaili, Allahvardi, Charakli, Talesh Mikael, Leysani, and Maleki. Each tribe has its own meaning, in that they have basically used the names of their elders, but some of them, such as Leysani, have other meanings, including Li, meaning eagle, and San, meaning like and similar.

The cultivation of this village is irrigated and dry, and agricultural and drinking water is supplied from springs, deep wells, and through pipes. The residents mostly grow wheat, barley, and in recent years, lentils.

The climate of this village is cold in winter, but moderate in spring and summer, and is suitable for traveling in summer. The villagers mostly live in the village seasonally, with the majority of people in the village in summer.

The village has water, electricity, gas, telephone, television reception station, mosque, dirt football field, and mobile antenna.

The village has two mosques, one in the lower part of the village called Kohneh Masjid and the other in the upper part of the village called Qale Ichi Masjid.

Two mountains named Jebi Dagh (Gabriel) and Sari Dagh are located to the north of the village.

Qalichi village has the largest arable land in the region after the Moghan Plain, which is approximately 1000 hectares, and in terms of yield, it has the best yield in the region.

Among the valleys of the village, we can mention Tavadashi, Sadeq Dareh Si, Chap Dareh and Nemat Dareh Si.

== Demographics ==
=== Population ===
At the time of the 2006 National Census, the village's population was 118 in 38 households. The following census in 2011 counted 70 people in 30 households. The 2016 census measured the population of the village as 73 people in 37 households.
