= Naqdi Kandi =

Village in Ardabil province, Iran

Naqdi Kandi Persian: نقدي كندي
- Village
- Location within Iran
- Coordinates: 38°33′52″N 48°11′26″E
- Country: Iran
- Province: Ardabil
- County: Ardabil
- District: Central
- Rural District: Arshaq-e Sharqi

Population (2016)
  - Total: 92
- Time zone: UTC+3:30 (IRST)

Naqdi Kandi (Persian: نقدي كندي) (Note: Also romanized as Naqdī Kandī; also known as Nogdi Kandī) is a village in Arshaq-e Sharqi Rural District of the Central District in Ardabil County, Ardabil province, Iran.

== Demographics ==
=== Population ===
At the time of the 2006 National Census, the village's population was 147 in 24 households. The following census in 2011 counted 95 people in 20 households. The 2016 census measured the population of the village as 92 people in 27 households.
