= Khoshkeh Rud, Ardabil =

Village in Ardabil province, Iran

Khoshkeh Rud Persian: خشكه رود
- Village
- Location within Iran
- Coordinates: 38°17′18″N 48°08′17″E
- Country: Iran
- Province: Ardabil
- County: Ardabil
- District: Central
- Rural District: Sardabeh

Population (2016)
  - Total: 891
- Time zone: UTC+3:30 (IRST)

Khoshkeh Rud (Persian: خشكه رود) (Note: Also romanized as Khoshkeh Rūd; also known as Khoshgeh Rūd and Khoshk Rūd) is a village in, and the capital of, Sardabeh Rural District in the Central District of Ardabil County, Ardabil province, Iran.

== Demographics ==
=== Population ===
At the time of the 2006 National Census, the village's population was 840 in 160 households. The following census in 2011 counted 884 people in 213 households. The 2016 census measured the population of the village as 891 people in 238 households.
