= Arvanaq =

Village in Ardabil province, Iran

Arvanaq Persian: اروانق
- Village
- Location within Iran
- Coordinates: 38°15′09″N 48°04′11″E
- Country: Iran
- Province: Ardabil
- County: Ardabil
- District: Central
- Rural District: Sardabeh

Population (2016)
  - Total: 185
- Time zone: UTC+3:30 (IRST)

Arvanaq (Persian: اروانق) (Note: Also romanized as Arvānaq; also known as Aruna (‌ارونا)) is a village in Sardabeh Rural District of the Central District in Ardabil County, Ardabil province, Iran.

== Demographics ==
=== Population ===
At the time of the 2006 National Census, the village's population was 269 in 56 households. The following census in 2011 counted 225 people in 59 households. The 2016 census measured the population of the village as 185 people in 55 households.
