= Masumabad, Ardabil =

Village in Ardabil province, Iran

Masumabad Persian: معصوم اباد
- Village
- Location within Iran
- Coordinates: 38°21′38″N 48°12′07″E
- Country: Iran
- Province: Ardabil
- County: Ardabil
- District: Samarin
- Rural District: Gharbi

Population (2016)
  - Total: 668
- Time zone: UTC+3:30 (IRST)

Masumabad (Persian: معصوم اباد) (Note: Also romanized as Ma‘şūmābād) is a village in Gharbi Rural District of Samarin District in Ardabil County, Ardabil province, Iran.

== Demographics ==
=== Population ===
At the time of the 2006 National Census, the village's population was 617 in 125 households. The following census in 2011 counted 687 people in 148 households, by which time the rural district had been separated from the district in the formation of Samarin District. The 2016 census measured the population of the village as 668 people in 160 households.
