= Kharabeh-ye Kohal =

Village in Ardabil province, Iran

Kharabeh-ye Kohal Persian: خرابه كهل
- Village
- Location within Iran
- Coordinates: 38°08′51″N 48°10′25″E
- Country: Iran
- Province: Ardabil
- County: Ardabil
- District: Central
- Rural District: Balghelu

Population (2016)
  - Total: 119
- Time zone: UTC+3:30 (IRST)

Kharabeh-ye Kohal (Persian: خرابه كهل) (Note: Also romanized as Kharābeh-ye Kohal; also known as ‘Alīābād) is a village in Balghelu Rural District of the Central District in Ardabil County, Ardabil province, Iran.

== Demographics ==
=== Population ===
At the time of the 2006 National Census, the village's population was 100 in 21 households. The following census in 2011 counted 123 people in 32 households. The 2016 census measured the population of the village as 119 people in 34 households.
