= Ali Qeshlaqi =

Ali Qeshlaqi (Persian: علي قشلاقي), also rendered as Ali Qeshlaq, may refer to:

- Ali Qeshlaqi, Ardabil
- Ali Qeshlaqi, East Azerbaijan
