= Niar, Ardabil =

Neighborhood in Ardabil province, Iran

Niar Persian: نيار
- Neighborhood
- Location within Iran
- Coordinates: 38°14′13″N 48°19′36″E
- Country: Iran
- Province: Ardabil
- County: Ardabil
- District: Central
- City: Ardabil

Population (2006)
  - Total: 8,405
- Time zone: UTC+3:30 (IRST)

Niar (Persian: نيار) (Note: Also romanized as Nīār and Niyar) is a neighborhood in the city of Ardabil in the Central District of Ardabil County, Ardabil province, Iran.

== Demographics ==
=== Population ===
At the time of the 2006 National Census, Niar's population was 8,405 in 2,218 households, when it was a village in, and the capital of, Sharqi Rural District. After the census, the village was annexed by the city of Ardabil.

Muqaddas Ardabili, the prominent Shia scholar of the Safavid era, was originally from the Niar neighborhood of Ardabil.
