= Sharif Beyglu =

Village in Ardabil province, Iran

Sharif Beyglu Persian: شريف بيگلو
- Village
- Location within Iran
- Coordinates: 38°35′05″N 48°11′01″E
- Country: Iran
- Province: Ardabil
- County: Ardabil
- District: Central
- Rural District: Arshaq-e Sharqi

Population (2016)
  - Total: 248
- Time zone: UTC+3:30 (IRST)

Sharif Beyglu (Persian: شريف بيگلو) (Note: Also romanized as Sharīf Beyglū) is a village in Arshaq-e Sharqi Rural District of the Central District in Ardabil County, Ardabil province, Iran.

== Demographics ==
=== Population ===
At the time of the 2006 National Census, the village's population was 470 in 86 households. The following census in 2011 counted 350 people in 87 households. The 2016 census measured the population of the village as 248 people in 73 households.
