= Qaleh Juq-e Sabalan =

Village in Ardabil province, Iran

Qaleh Juq-e Sabalan Persian: قلعه جوق سبلان
- Village
- Location within Iran
- Coordinates: 38°15′47″N 48°06′47″E
- Country: Iran
- Province: Ardabil
- County: Ardabil
- District: Central
- Rural District: Sardabeh

Population (2016)
  - Total: 675
- Time zone: UTC+3:30 (IRST)

Qaleh Juq-e Sabalan (Persian: قلعه جوق سبلان) (Note: Also romanized as Qal‘eh Jūq-e Sabalān; also known as Qal‘eh Jūq) is a village in Sardabeh Rural District of the Central District in Ardabil County, Ardabil province, Iran.

== Demographics ==
=== Population ===
At the time of the 2006 National Census, the village's population was 796 in 181 households. The following census in 2011 counted 761 people in 219 households. The 2016 census measured the population of the village as 675 people in 213 households.
