= Shahrivar, Iran =

Village in Ardabil province, Iran

Shahrivar Persian: شهريور
- Village
- Location within Iran
- Coordinates: 38°19′49″N 48°11′43″E
- Country: Iran
- Province: Ardabil
- County: Ardabil
- District: Central
- Rural District: Sardabeh

Population (2016)
  - Total: 299
- Time zone: UTC+3:30 (IRST)

Shahrivar (Persian: شهريور) (Note: Also romanized as Shahrīvar; also known as Shahr-e Būr and Shohrehvar) is a village in Sardabeh Rural District of the Central District in Ardabil County, Ardabil province, Iran.

The majority of the village's population are Russian immigrants. Historical sites in the village include the Shahrivar Hill of the Sasanian–Parthian period, which was registered as one of Iran's national monuments on 4 December 2008.

== Demographics ==
=== Population ===
At the time of the 2006 National Census, the village's population was 474 in 118 households. The following census in 2011 counted 353 people in 97 households. The 2016 census measured the population of the village as 299 people in 94 households.
