= Sham Asbi =

Village in Ardabil province, Iran

Sham Asbi Persian: شام اسبي
- Village
- Location within Iran
- Coordinates: 38°11′36″N 48°14′38″E
- Country: Iran
- Province: Ardabil
- County: Ardabil
- District: Central
- Rural District: Balghelu

Population (2016)
  - Total: 2,817
- Time zone: UTC+3:30 (IRST)

Sham Asbi (Persian: شام اسبي) (Note: Also romanized as Shām Asbī; also known as Shamaspi) is a village in, and the capital of, Balghelu Rural District in the Central District of Ardabil County, Ardabil province, Iran.

== Etymology ==
The locals of Sham Asbi identify the first part of the village's name with Sham, i.e. "Syria", interpreting it as "a place with Syrian horses." According to Alice Assadoorian in Iran and the Caucasus, the toponym appears to be an old compound, and thus the folk etymology "can hardly be satisfying." Assadoorian notes that the final –ī in the place name alludes to a patronymic formation, which allows for the reconstruction of the Middle Iranian form of the toponym as *Šāmaspīk or *Šāmāspīk, which translates as "a village belonging to (or founded by) *Šāmāsp." The name *Šāmāsp is a familiar personal name, and derives from Old Iranian *S(i)yāmāspa-, i.e. "(a man) having black or dark studs" (compare Avestan Syāvaspi- and Armenian Šawasp). Assadoorian argues that there was "secondary dissimilation of the initial s- to š-."

== Demographics ==
=== Population ===
At the time of the 2006 National Census, the village's population was 2,148 in 511 households. The following census in 2011 counted 2,609 people in 734 households. The 2016 census measured the population of the village as 2,817 people in 820 households. It was the most populous village in its rural district.
