= Anzab-e Olya =

Village in Ardabil province, Iran

Anzab-e Olya Persian: انزاب عليا
- Village
- Location within Iran
- Coordinates: 38°19′16″N 48°18′44″E
- Country: Iran
- Province: Ardabil
- County: Ardabil
- District: Central
- Rural District: Kalkhuran

Population (2016)
  - Total: 1,659
- Time zone: UTC+3:30 (IRST)

Anzab-e Olya (Persian: انزاب عليا) (Note: Also romanized as Anzāb-e ‘Olyā; also known as Āb, Anzāb, and Anzāb-e Bālā) is a village in Kalkhuran Rural District of the Central District in Ardabil County, Ardabil province, Iran.

== Demographics ==
=== Population ===
At the time of the 2006 National Census, the village's population was 1,581 in 366 households. The following census in 2011 counted 1,403 people in 408 households. The 2016 census measured the population of the village as 1,659 people in 502 households.
