= Alqar =

Alqar (Persian: القار) may refer to:

- Pir Alqar
- Elqar, South Khorasan
