= Banafsheh Daraq, Ardabil =

Village in Ardabil province, Iran

Banafsheh Daraq Persian: بنفشه درق
- Village
- Location within Iran
- Coordinates: 38°10′53″N 48°16′48″E
- Country: Iran
- Province: Ardabil
- County: Ardabil
- District: Central
- Rural District: Balghelu

Population (2016)
  - Total: 360
- Time zone: UTC+3:30 (IRST)

Banafsheh Daraq (Persian: بنفشه درق) is a village in Balghelu Rural District of the Central District in Ardabil County, Ardabil province, Iran.

== Demographics ==
=== Population ===
At the time of the 2006 National Census, the village's population was 339 in 65 households. The following census in 2011 counted 335 people in 85 households. The 2016 census measured the population of the village as 360 people in 108 households.
