= Dashlujeh =

Dashlujeh (Persian: داشلوجه) may refer to:

- Dashlujeh, Ardabil
- Dashlujeh, East Azerbaijan
- Dashlujeh, Zanjan
