= Mohammad Janlu =

Village in Ardabil province, Iran

Mohammad Janlu Persian: محمدجان لو
- Village
- Location within Iran
- Coordinates: 38°32′18″N 48°12′06″E
- Country: Iran
- Province: Ardabil
- County: Ardabil
- District: Central
- Rural District: Arshaq-e Sharqi

Population (2016)
  - Total: 23
- Time zone: UTC+3:30 (IRST)

Mohammad Janlu (Persian: محمدجان لو) (Note: Also romanized as Moḩammad Jānlū; also known as Moḩammad Jānī) is a village in Arshaq-e Sharqi Rural District of the Central District in Ardabil County, Ardabil province, Iran.

== Demographics ==
=== Population ===
At the time of the 2006 National Census, the village's population was 90 in 21 households. The following census in 2011 counted 35 people in 10 households. The 2016 census measured the population of the village as 23 people in seven households.
