= Raziabad, Ardabil =

Village in Ardabil province, Iran

Raziabad Persian: رضي اباد
- Village
- Location within Iran
- Coordinates: 38°10′49″N 48°22′12″E
- Country: Iran
- Province: Ardabil
- County: Ardabil
- District: Central
- Rural District: Sharqi

Population (2016)
  - Total: 412
- Time zone: UTC+3:30 (IRST)

Raziabad (Persian: رضي اباد) (Note: Also romanized as Raẕīābād) is a village in Sharqi Rural District of the Central District in Ardabil County, Ardabil province, Iran.

== Demographics ==
=== Population ===
At the time of the 2006 National Census, the village's population was 272 in 62 households. The following census in 2011 counted 327 people in 88 households. The 2016 census measured the population of the village as 412 people in 123 households.
