= Chehel Gaz =

Village in Ardabil province, Iran

Chehel Gaz Persian: چهل گز
- Village
- Location within Iran
- Coordinates: 38°18′25″N 48°04′39″E
- Country: Iran
- Province: Ardabil
- County: Ardabil
- District: Central
- Rural District: Sardabeh

Population (2016)
  - Total: 62
- Time zone: UTC+3:30 (IRST)

Chehel Gaz (Persian: چهل گز) (Note: Also known as Chākīāl, Chalgial, and Chelgazī) is a village in Sardabeh Rural District of the Central District in Ardabil County, Ardabil province, Iran.

== Demographics ==
=== Population ===
At the time of the 2006 National Census, the village's population was 196 in 37 households. The following census in 2011 counted 28 people in seven households. The 2016 census measured the population of the village as 62 people in 21 households.
