= Chaghungenesh =

Village in Ardabil province, Iran

Chaghungenesh Persian: چاغونگنش
- Village
- Location within Iran
- Coordinates: 38°36′45″N 48°15′33″E
- Country: Iran
- Province: Ardabil
- County: Ardabil
- District: Central
- Rural District: Arshaq-e Sharqi

Population (2016)
  - Total: 40
- Time zone: UTC+3:30 (IRST)

Chaghungenesh (Persian: چاغونگنش) (Note: Also romanized as Chāghūngenesh; also known as Chāghūn Kenesh and Chūngīnesh) is a village in Arshaq-e Sharqi Rural District of the Central District in Ardabil County, Ardabil province, Iran.

== Demographics ==
=== Population ===
At the time of the 2006 National Census, the village's population was 115 in 26 households. The following census in 2011 counted 57 people in 13 households. The 2016 census measured the population of the village as 40 people in 13 households.
