= Imir, Ardabil =

Village in Ardabil province, Iran

Imir Persian: ايمير
- Village
- Location within Iran
- Coordinates: 38°30′37″N 48°11′21″E
- Country: Iran
- Province: Ardabil
- County: Ardabil
- District: Central
- Rural District: Arshaq-e Sharqi

Population (2016)
  - Total: 42
- Time zone: UTC+3:30 (IRST)

Imir (Persian: ايمير) (Note: Also romanized as Īmīr) is a village in Arshaq-e Sharqi Rural District of the Central District in Ardabil County, Ardabil province, Iran.

== Demographics ==
=== Population ===
At the time of the 2006 National Census, the village's population was 90 in 15 households. The following census in 2011 counted 57 people in 12 households. The 2016 census measured the population of the village as 42 people in 10 households.
