= Khalaj, Ardabil =

Village in Ardabil province, Iran

Khalaj Persian: خلج
- Village
- Location within Iran
- Coordinates: 38°27′57″N 48°13′04″E
- Country: Iran
- Province: Ardabil
- County: Ardabil
- District: Central
- Rural District: Arshaq-e Sharqi

Population (2016)
  - Total: 20
- Time zone: UTC+3:30 (IRST)

Khalaj (Persian: خلج) is a village in Arshaq-e Sharqi Rural District of the Central District in Ardabil County, Ardabil province, Iran.

== Demographics ==
=== Population ===
At the time of the 2006 National Census, the village's population was 17 in four households. The following census in 2011 counted 21 people in five households. The 2016 census measured the population of the village as 20 people in four households.
