= Sardabeh =

Village in Ardabil province, Iran

Sardabeh Persian: سردابه
- Village
- Location within Iran
- Coordinates: 38°17′02″N 48°02′14″E
- Country: Iran
- Province: Ardabil
- County: Ardabil
- District: Central
- Rural District: Sardabeh

Population (2016)
  - Total: 0
- Time zone: UTC+3:30 (IRST)

Sardabeh (Persian: سردابه) (Note: Also romanized as Sardābeh) is a village in Sardabeh Rural District of the Central District in Ardabil County, Ardabil province, Iran.

== Demographics ==
=== Population ===
At the time of the 2006 National Census, the village's population was 11 in four households. The village did not appear in the following census of 2011. The 2016 census measured the population of the village as zero.
