= Shisheh =

Shisheh (Persian: شيشه) may refer to:

places

- Shisheh, East Azerbaijan
- Shisheh, Lorestan
- Shisheh Garan

other uses

- Shisha (embroidery)
