= Qeshlaq-e Owch Bolagh =

Village in Ardabil province, Iran

Qeshlaq-e Owch Bolagh Persian: قشلاق اوچ بلاغ
- Village
- Location within Iran
- Coordinates: 38°34′01″N 48°08′04″E
- Country: Iran
- Province: Ardabil
- County: Ardabil
- District: Central
- Rural District: Arshaq-e Sharqi

Population (2016)
  - Total: 9
- Time zone: UTC+3:30 (IRST)

Qeshlaq-e Owch Bolagh (Persian: قشلاق اوچ بلاغ) (Note: Also romanized as Qeshlāq-e Owch Bolāgh) is a village in Arshaq-e Sharqi Rural District of the Central District in Ardabil County, Ardabil province, Iran.

== Demographics ==
=== Population ===
At the time of the 2006 National Census, the village's population was nine in four households. The following census in 2011 counted nine people in four households. The 2016 census measured the population of the village as nine people in four households.
