= Vakilabad, Ardabil =

Village in Ardabil province, Iran

Vakilabad Persian: وكيل اباد
- Village
- Location within Iran
- Coordinates: 38°16′56″N 48°03′14″E
- Country: Iran
- Province: Ardabil
- County: Ardabil
- District: Central
- Rural District: Sardabeh

Population (2016)
  - Total: 868
- Time zone: UTC+3:30 (IRST)

Vakilabad (Persian: وكيل اباد) (Note: Also romanized as Vakīlābād) is a village in Sardabeh Rural District of the Central District in Ardabil County, Ardabil province, Iran.

== Demographics ==
=== Population ===
At the time of the 2006 National Census, the village's population was 888 in 180 households. The following census in 2011 counted 959 people in 242 households. The 2016 census measured the population of the village as 868 people in 228 households.
