= Aqcheh Kand, Ardabil =

Village in Ardabil province, Iran

Aqcheh Kand Persian: اقچه كند
- Village
- Location within Iran
- Coordinates: 38°21′22″N 48°17′59″E
- Country: Iran
- Province: Ardabil
- County: Ardabil
- District: Central
- Rural District: Kalkhuran

Population (2016)
  - Total: 434
- Time zone: UTC+3:30 (IRST)

Aqcheh Kand (Persian: اقچه كند) (Note: Also romanized as Āqcheh Kand; also known as Āghcheh Kand and Āqcheh Kandī) is a village in Kalkhuran Rural District of the Central District in Ardabil County, Ardabil province, Iran.

== Demographics ==
=== Population ===
At the time of the 2006 National Census, the village's population was 567 in 126 households. The following census in 2011 counted 483 people in 121 households. The 2016 census measured the population of the village as 434 people in 126 households.
