= Omidcheh, Ardabil =

Village in Ardabil province, Iran

Omidcheh Persian: اميدچه
- Village
- Location within Iran
- Coordinates: 38°16′27″N 48°09′43″E
- Country: Iran
- Province: Ardabil
- County: Ardabil
- District: Central
- Rural District: Sardabeh

Population (2016)
  - Total: 1,639
- Time zone: UTC+3:30 (IRST)

Omidcheh (Persian: اميدچه) (Note: Also romanized as Omīdcheh) is a village in Sardabeh Rural District of the Central District in Ardabil County, Ardabil province, Iran.

== Demographics ==
=== Population ===
At the time of the 2006 National Census, the village's population was 1,710 in 392 households. The following census in 2011 counted 1,684 people in 482 households. The 2016 census measured the population of the village as 1,639 people in 503 households.
