= Aq Qaleh, Ardabil =

Village in Ardabil province, Iran

Aq Qaleh Persian: اق قلعه
- Village
- Location within Iran
- Coordinates: 38°31′57″N 48°09′53″E
- Country: Iran
- Province: Ardabil
- County: Ardabil
- District: Central
- Rural District: Arshaq-e Sharqi

Population (2016)
  - Total: 73
- Time zone: UTC+3:30 (IRST)

Aq Qaleh (Persian: اق قلعه) (Note: Also romanized as Āq Qal‘eh; also known as Āgh Qal‘eh and Āk Kaleh) is a village in Arshaq-e Sharqi Rural District of the Central District in Ardabil County, Ardabil province, Iran.

== Demographics ==
=== Population ===
At the time of the 2006 National Census, the village's population was 119 in 22 households. The following census in 2011 counted 118 people in 32 households. The 2016 census measured the population of the village as 73 people in 20 households.
