= Garjan =

Village in Ardabil province, Iran

Garjan Persian: گرجان
- Village
- Location within Iran
- Coordinates: 38°18′48″N 48°12′40″E
- Country: Iran
- Province: Ardabil
- County: Ardabil
- District: Central
- Rural District: Sardabeh

Population (2016)
  - Total: 876
- Time zone: UTC+3:30 (IRST)

Garjan (Persian: گرجان) (Note: Also romanized as Garjān) is a village in Sardabeh Rural District of the Central District in Ardabil County, Ardabil province, Iran.

== Demographics ==
=== Population ===
At the time of the 2006 National Census, the village's population was 936 in 233 households. The following census in 2011 counted 884 people in 260 households. The 2016 census measured the population of the village as 876 people in 268 households.
