= Gonsul Kandi =

Village in Ardabil province, Iran

Gonsul Kandi Persian: گنسول كندي
- Village
- Location within Iran
- Coordinates: 38°19′25″N 48°03′22″E
- Country: Iran
- Province: Ardabil
- County: Ardabil
- District: Central
- Rural District: Sardabeh

Population (2016)
  - Total: 435
- Time zone: UTC+3:30 (IRST)

Gonsul Kandi (Persian: گنسول كندي) (Note: Also romanized as Gonsūl Kandī; also known as Konsūl Kandī and Qonsūl Kandī) is a village in Sardabeh Rural District of the Central District in Ardabil County, Ardabil province, Iran.

== Demographics ==
=== Population ===
At the time of the 2006 National Census, the village's population was 603 in 134 households. The following census in 2011 counted 524 people in 137 households. The 2016 census measured the population of the village as 435 people in 133 households.
