= Mokhtarabad, Ardabil =

Village in Ardabil province, Iran

Mokhtarabad Persian: مختاراباد
- Village
- Country: Iran
- Province: Ardabil
- County: Ardabil
- District: Samarin
- Rural District: Gharbi

Population (2016)
  - Total: 23
- Time zone: UTC+3:30 (IRST)

Mokhtarabad (Persian: مختاراباد) (Note: Also romanized as Mokhtārābād) is a village in Gharbi Rural District of Samarin District in Ardabil County, Ardabil province, Iran.

== Demographics ==
=== Population ===
At the time of the 2006 National Census, the village's population was 35 in six households. The following census in 2011 counted 22 people in five households, by which time the rural district had been separated from the district in the formation of Samarin District. The 2016 census measured the population of the village as 23 people in five households.
