= Almas, Ardabil =

Village in Ardabil province, Iran

Almas Persian: الماس
- Village
- Location within Iran
- Coordinates: 38°09′01″N 48°12′00″E
- Country: Iran
- Province: Ardabil
- County: Ardabil
- District: Central
- Rural District: Balghelu

Population (2016)
  - Total: 135
- Time zone: UTC+3:30 (IRST)

Almas (Persian: الماس) (Note: Also romanized as Almās) is a village in Balghelu Rural District of the Central District in Ardabil County, Ardabil province, Iran.

== Demographics ==
=== Population ===
At the time of the 2006 National Census, the village's population was 169 in 42 households. The following census in 2011 counted 134 people in 38 households. The 2016 census measured the population of the village as 135 people in 44 households.
