= Qarahlar, Ardabil =

Village in Ardabil province, Iran

Qarahlar Persian: قره لر
- Village
- Location within Iran
- Coordinates: 38°17′21″N 48°24′04″E
- Country: Iran
- Province: Ardabil
- County: Ardabil
- District: Central
- Rural District: Kalkhuran

Population (2016)
  - Total: 529
- Time zone: UTC+3:30 (IRST)

Qarahlar (Persian: قره لر) is a village in Kalkhuran Rural District of the Central District in Ardabil County, Ardabil province, Iran.

== Demographics ==
=== Population ===
At the time of the 2006 National Census, the village's population was 792 in 141 households. The following census in 2011 counted 587 people in 153 households. The 2016 census measured the population of the village as 529 people in 156 households.
