= Chat Qayah =

Chat Qayah (Persian: چات قيه) may refer to:

- Chat Qayah, Ardabil
- Chat Qayah, East Azerbaijan
