= Topraqlu =

Village in Ardabil province, Iran

Topraqlu Persian: تپراقلو
- Village
- Location within Iran
- Coordinates: 38°12′04″N 48°27′10″E
- Country: Iran
- Province: Ardabil
- County: Ardabil
- District: Central
- Rural District: Sharqi

Population (2016)
  - Total: 666
- Time zone: UTC+3:30 (IRST)

Topraqlu (Persian: تپراقلو) (Note: Also romanized as Toprāqlū; also known as Tūprāqlū and Tūryākhlū) is a village in Sharqi Rural District of the Central District in Ardabil County, Ardabil province, Iran.

== Demographics ==
=== Population ===
At the time of the 2006 National Census, the village's population was 888 in 189 households. The following census in 2011 counted 755 people in 207 households. The 2016 census measured the population of the village as 666 people in 192 households.
