= Kaftareh =

Village in Ardabil province, Iran

Kaftareh Persian: كفتاره
- Village
- Location within Iran
- Coordinates: 38°32′49″N 48°12′25″E
- Country: Iran
- Province: Ardabil
- County: Ardabil
- District: Central
- Rural District: Arshaq-e Sharqi

Population (2016)
  - Total: 27
- Time zone: UTC+3:30 (IRST)

Kaftareh (Persian: كفتاره) (Note: Also romanized as Kaftāreh; also known as Kaftārī) is a village in Arshaq-e Sharqi Rural District of the Central District in Ardabil County, Ardabil province, Iran.

== Demographics ==
=== Population ===
At the time of the 2006 National Census, the village's population was 36 in six households. The following census in 2011 counted 37 people in eight households. The 2016 census measured the population of the village as 27 people in seven households.
