= Hamidabad, Ardabil =

Village in Ardabil province, Iran

Hamidabad Persian: حميداباد
- Village
- Location within Iran
- Coordinates: 38°10′03″N 48°18′52″E
- Country: Iran
- Province: Ardabil
- County: Ardabil
- District: Central
- Rural District: Sharqi

Population (2016)
  - Total: 61
- Time zone: UTC+3:30 (IRST)

Hamidabad (Persian: حميداباد) (Note: Also romanized as Ḩamīdābād) is a village in Sharqi Rural District of the Central District in Ardabil County, Ardabil province, Iran.

== Demographics ==
=== Population ===
At the time of the 2006 National Census, the village's population was 75 in 21 households. The following census in 2011 counted 67 people in 18 households. The 2016 census measured the population of the village as 61 people in 17 households.
