= Ardi (disambiguation) =

Ardi (ARA-VP-6/500) is the designation of the fossilized skeletal remains of an Ardipithecus ramidus, believed to be an early human-like female anthropoid 4.4 million years old.

Ardi may also refer to:

== Places ==
- Ardi, Iran, a village in Kalkharan Rural District, in the Central District of Ardabil County, Ardabil Province, Iran
- Ardi Musa, a village in the Sabalan District of Sareyn County, Ardabil Province, Iran

== People ==
- Ardi Liives (1929–1992), Estonian writer
- Ardi Qejvani (born 1993), Albanian footballer
- Ardi Warsidi (born 1979), Indonesian footballer
- Dana Beth Ardi, American entrepreneur, venture capitalist, human capitalist, author, and contemporary art collector
- Respati Ardi (born 1988), Indonesian politician and Mayor of Surakarta

== Others ==
- ARDI, Access to Research for Development and Innovation program, a partnership between the World Intellectual Property Organization and major scientific and technical publishers
