= Pir Alvan =

Village in Ardabil province, Iran

Pir Alvan Persian: پيرالوان
- Village
- Location within Iran
- Coordinates: 38°28′43″N 48°06′49″E
- Country: Iran
- Province: Ardabil
- County: Ardabil
- District: Central
- Rural District: Arshaq-e Sharqi

Population (2016)
  - Total: 38
- Time zone: UTC+3:30 (IRST)

Pir Alvan (Persian: پيرالوان) (Note: Also romanized as Pīr Ālvān and Pīr Alvān) is a village in Arshaq-e Sharqi Rural District of the Central District in Ardabil County, Ardabil province, Iran.

== Demographics ==
=== Population ===
At the time of the 2006 National Census, the village's population was 60 in 22 households. The following census in 2011 showed a population below the reporting threshold. The 2016 census measured the population of the village as six people in four households.
