= Tazeh Kand-e Rezaabad =

Village in Ardabil province, Iran

Tazeh Kand-e Rezaabad Persian: تازه كندرضااباد
- Village
- Location within Iran
- Coordinates: 38°19′25″N 48°23′46″E
- Country: Iran
- Province: Ardabil
- County: Ardabil
- District: Central
- Rural District: Kalkhuran

Population (2016)
  - Total: 176
- Time zone: UTC+3:30 (IRST)

Tazeh Kand-e Rezaabad (Persian: تازه كندرضااباد) (Note: Also romanized as Tāzeh Kand-e Reẕāābād; also known as Reẕāābād) is a village in Kalkhuran Rural District of the Central District in Ardabil County, Ardabil province, Iran.

== Demographics ==
=== Population ===
At the time of the 2006 National Census, the village's population was 141 in 35 households. The following census in 2011 counted 154 people in 39 households. The 2016 census measured the population of the village as 176 people in 43 households.
