= Jabah Dar =

Village in Ardabil province, Iran

Jabah Dar Persian: جبه دار
- Village
- Location within Iran
- Coordinates: 38°21′58″N 48°12′50″E
- Country: Iran
- Province: Ardabil
- County: Ardabil
- District: Samarin
- Rural District: Gharbi

Population (2016)
  - Total: 1,588
- Time zone: UTC+3:30 (IRST)

Jabah Dar (Persian: جبه دار) (Note: Also romanized as Jabah Dār, Jabahdār, and Jabehdar) is a village in Gharbi Rural District of Samarin District in Ardabil County, Ardabil province, Iran.

== Demographics ==
=== Population ===
At the time of the 2006 National Census, the village's population was 1,529 in 330 households. The following census in 2011 counted 1,577 people in 410 households, by which time the rural district had been separated from the district in the formation of Samarin District. The 2016 census measured the population of the village as 1,588 people in 455 households.
