= Savoj Bolagh =

Village in Ardabil province, Iran

Savoj Bolagh Persian: ساوج بلاغ
- Village
- Location within Iran
- Country: Iran
- Province: Ardabil
- County: Ardabil
- District: Central
- Rural District: Arshaq-e Sharqi

Population (2016)
  - Total: 153
- Time zone: UTC+3:30 (IRST)

Savoj Bolagh (Persian: ساوج بلاغ) (Note: Also romanized as Sāvoj Bolāgh; also known as Sāvoj Bolāghī) is a village in Arshaq-e Sharqi Rural District of the Central District in Ardabil County, Ardabil province, Iran.

== Demographics ==
=== Population ===
At the time of the 2006 National Census, the village's population was 261 in 54 households. The following census in 2011 counted 190 people in 51 households. The 2016 census measured the population of the village as 153 people in 47 households.
