= Kamiabad =

Village in Ardabil province, Iran

Kamiabad Persian: كمي اباد
- Village
- Location within Iran
- Coordinates: 38°10′46″N 48°21′41″E
- Country: Iran
- Province: Ardabil
- County: Ardabil
- District: Central
- Rural District: Sharqi

Population (2016)
  - Total: 558
- Time zone: UTC+3:30 (IRST)

Kamiabad (Persian: كمي اباد) (Note: Also romanized as Kamīābād) is a village in Sharqi Rural District of the Central District in Ardabil County, Ardabil province, Iran.

== Demographics ==
=== Population ===
At the time of the 2006 National Census, the village's population was 563 in 128 households. The following census in 2011 counted 556 people in 151 households. The 2016 census measured the population of the village as 558 people in 163 households.
