= Divlaq =

Village in Ardabil province, Iran

Divlaq Persian: ديولق
- Village
- Location within Iran
- Coordinates: 38°14′49″N 48°07′37″E
- Country: Iran
- Province: Ardabil
- County: Ardabil
- District: Central
- Rural District: Sardabeh

Population (2016)
  - Total: 1,057
- Time zone: UTC+3:30 (IRST)

Divlaq (Persian: ديولق) (Note: Also romanized as Dīvlaq; also known as Dowlaq) is a village in Sardabeh Rural District of the Central District in Ardabil County, Ardabil province, Iran.

== Demographics ==
=== Population ===
At the time of the 2006 National Census, the village's population was 1,137 in 244 households. The following census in 2011 counted 1,131 people in 292 households. The 2016 census measured the population of the village as 1,057 people in 280 households.
