= Rowshanaq =

Village in Ardabil province, Iran

Rowshanaq Persian: روشنق
- Village
- Location within Iran
- Coordinates: 38°07′10″N 48°11′14″E
- Country: Iran
- Province: Ardabil
- County: Ardabil
- District: Central
- Rural District: Balghelu

Population (2016)
  - Total: 252
- Time zone: UTC+3:30 (IRST)

Rowshanaq (Persian: روشنق) (Note: Also known as Rowshanak) is a village in Balghelu Rural District of the Central District in Ardabil County, Ardabil province, Iran.

== Demographics ==
=== Population ===
At the time of the 2006 National Census, the village's population was 248 in 48 households. The following census in 2011 counted 229 people in 50 households. The 2016 census measured the population of the village as 252 people in 75 households.
