= Vareh Now =

Village in Ardabil province, Iran

Vareh Now Persian: وره نو
- Village
- Location within Iran
- Coordinates: 38°06′57″N 48°12′30″E
- Country: Iran
- Province: Ardabil
- County: Ardabil
- District: Central
- Rural District: Balghelu

Population (2016)
  - Total: 74
- Time zone: UTC+3:30 (IRST)

Vareh Now (Persian: وره نو) is a village in Balghelu Rural District of the Central District in Ardabil County, Ardabil province, Iran.

== Demographics ==
=== Population ===
At the time of the 2006 National Census, the village's population was 19 in five households. The population in the following census of 2011 was below the reporting threshold. The 2016 census measured the population of the village as 74 people in 23 households.
