= Gol Tappeh, Ardabil =

Village in Ardabil province, Iran

Gol Tappeh Persian: گل تپه
- Village
- Location within Iran
- Coordinates: 38°35′12″N 48°13′14″E
- Country: Iran
- Province: Ardabil
- County: Ardabil
- District: Central
- Rural District: Arshaq-e Sharqi

Population (2016)
  - Total: 72
- Time zone: UTC+3:30 (IRST)

Gol Tappeh (Persian: گل تپه) is a village in Arshaq-e Sharqi Rural District of the Central District in Ardabil County, Ardabil province, Iran.

== Demographics ==
=== Population ===
At the time of the 2006 National Census, the village's population was 206 in 43 households. The following census in 2011 counted 127 people in 32 households. The 2016 census measured the population of the village as 72 people in 21 households.
