= Tazeh Kand-e Sharifabad =

Village in Ardabil province, Iran

Tazeh Kand-e Sharifabad Persian: تازه كندشريف اباد
- Village
- Location within Iran
- Coordinates: 38°20′11″N 48°16′50″E
- Country: Iran
- Province: Ardabil
- County: Ardabil
- District: Central
- Rural District: Kalkhuran

Population (2016)
  - Total: 599
- Time zone: UTC+3:30 (IRST)

Tazeh Kand-e Sharifabad (Persian: تازه كندشريف اباد) (Note: Also romanized as Tāzeh Kand-e Sharīfābād; also known as Tazeh Kand-e Vasfabad (تازه کند وصف آباد), also romanized as Tāzeh Kand-e Vaşfābād) is a village in Kalkhuran Rural District of the Central District in Ardabil County, Ardabil province, Iran.

== Demographics ==
=== Population ===
At the time of the 2006 National Census, the village's population was 735 in 145 households. The following census in 2011 counted 641 people in 151 households. The 2016 census measured the population of the village as 599 people in 163 households.
