= Hakim Qeshlaqi =

Village in Ardabil province, Iran

Hakim Qeshlaqi Persian: حكيم قشلاقي
- Village
- Location within Iran
- Coordinates: 38°08′17″N 48°10′47″E
- Country: Iran
- Province: Ardabil
- County: Ardabil
- District: Central
- Rural District: Balghelu

Population (2016)
  - Total: 1,571
- Time zone: UTC+3:30 (IRST)

Hakim Qeshlaqi (Persian: حكيم قشلاقي) (Note: Also romanized as Ḩakīm Qeshlāqī) is a village in Balghelu Rural District of the Central District in Ardabil County, Ardabil province, Iran.

== Demographics ==
=== Population ===
At the time of the 2006 National Census, the village's population was 1,312 in 268 households. The following census in 2011 counted 1,334 people in 314 households. The 2016 census measured the population of the village as 1,571 people in 410 households.
