= Jamayran =

Village in Ardabil province, Iran

Jamayran Persian: جمايران
- Village
- Location within Iran
- Coordinates: 38°26′34″N 48°10′28″E
- Country: Iran
- Province: Ardabil
- County: Ardabil
- District: Central
- Rural District: Arshaq-e Sharqi

Population (2016)
  - Total: 216
- Time zone: UTC+3:30 (IRST)

Jamayran (Persian: جمايران) (Note: Also romanized as Jamāyrān) is a village in Arshaq-e Sharqi Rural District of the Central District in Ardabil County, Ardabil province, Iran.

== Demographics ==
=== Population ===
At the time of the 2006 National Census, the village's population was 421 in 60 households. The following census in 2011 counted 287 people in 63 households. The 2016 census measured the population of the village as 216 people in 55 households.
