= Samarin =

City in Ardabil province, Iran

Samarin Persian: ثمرين
- City
- Location within Iran
- Coordinates: 38°21′22″N 48°08′12″E
- Country: Iran
- Province: Ardabil
- County: Ardabil
- District: Samarin
- Established as a city: 2018

Population (2016)
  - Total: 2,326
- Time zone: UTC+3:30 (IRST)

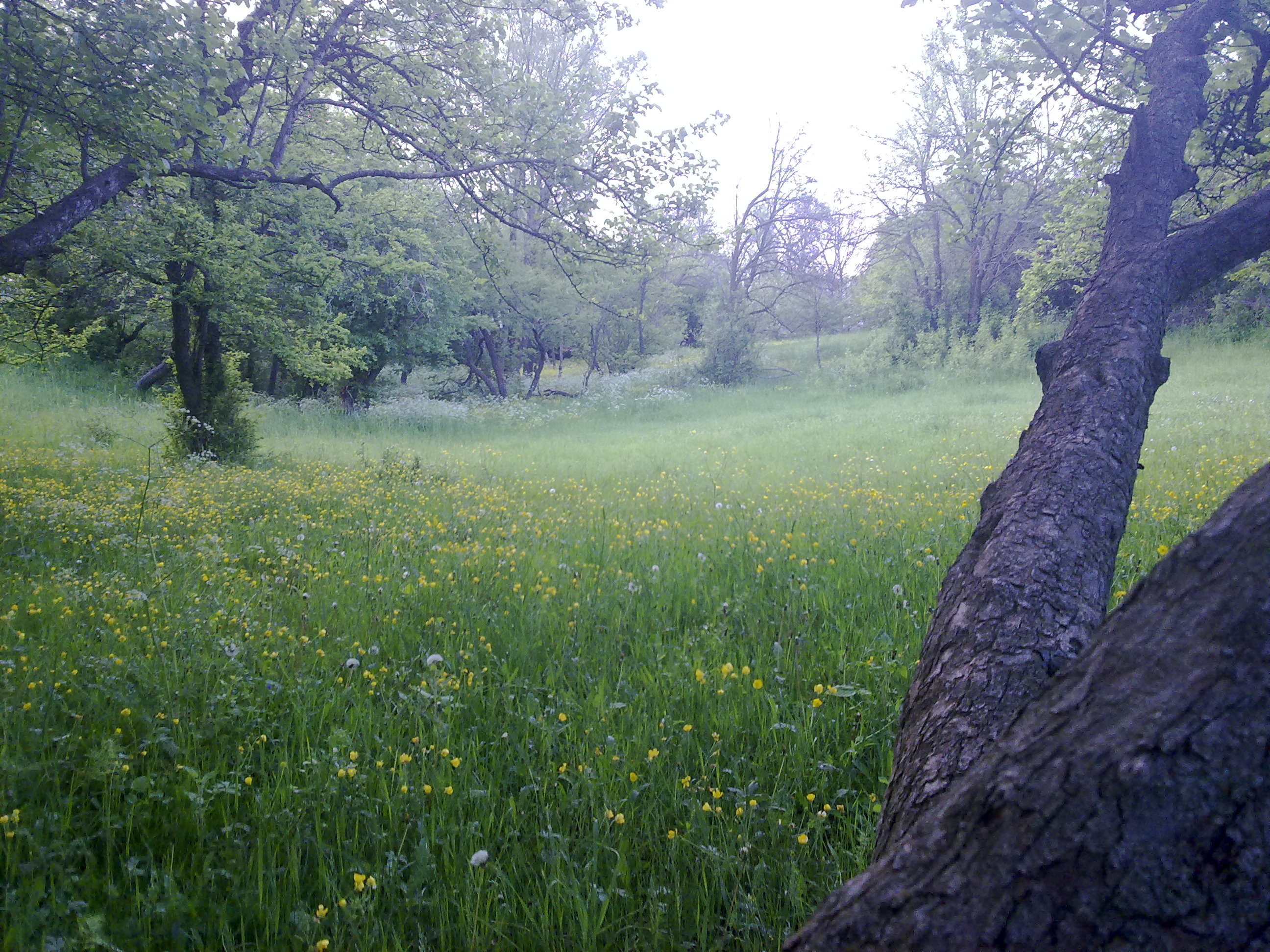
Davud Bay Garden in Sumarin

Samarin (Persian: ثمرين) (Note: Also romanized as S̄amarīn and S̄omarīn) is a city in, and the capital of, Samarin District in Ardabil County, Ardabil province, Iran. It also serves as the administrative center for Gharbi Rural District.

== Demographics ==
=== Population ===
At the time of the 2006 National Census, Samarin's population was 3,146 in 711 households, when it was a village in Gharbi Rural District of the Central District. The following census in 2011 counted 2,245 people in 596 households, by which time the rural district had been separated from the district in the formation of Samarin District. The 2016 census measured the population of the village as 2,326 people in 683 households. It was the most populous village in its rural district.

Samarin was converted to a city in 2018.
