= Chat Qayah, Ardabil =

Village in Ardabil province, Iran

Chat Qayah Persian: چات قيه
- Village
- Location within Iran
- Coordinates: 38°31′33″N 48°15′32″E
- Country: Iran
- Province: Ardabil
- County: Ardabil
- District: Central
- Rural District: Arshaq-e Sharqi

Population (2016)
  - Total: 41
- Time zone: UTC+3:30 (IRST)

Chat Qayah (Persian: چات قيه) (Note: Also romanized as Chāt Qāyah and Chāt Qayah) is a village in Arshaq-e Sharqi Rural District of the Central District in Ardabil County, Ardabil province, Iran.

== Demographics ==
=== Population ===
At the time of the 2006 National Census, the village's population was 96 in 19 households. The following census in 2011 counted 67 people in 19 households. The 2016 census measured the population of the village as 41 people in 13 households.
