= Qasem Qeshlaqi =

Qasem Qeshlaqi or Qasem Qeshlaq may refer to:

- Qasem Qeshlaqi, Ardabil, village in Ardabil County, Ardabil Province, Iran
- Qasem Qeshlaqi, Bileh Savar, village in Bileh Savar County, Ardabil Province, Iran
- Qasem Qeshlaqi, Nir, village in Nir County, Ardabil Province, Iran
