= Hassanali =

Surname

Hassanali is an Indian Muslim name combining Hassan and Ali. As a surname, it can refer to:

- Khalid Hassanali, Trinidad and Tobago engineer and businessman
- Mustafa Hassanali (born 1980), Tanzanian fashion designer and doctor
- Noor Hassanali (1918–2006), former President of Trinidad and Tobago

== See also ==
- Hasanali Kandi, village in Iran
- Deh-e Hasanali, Lorestan, village in Iran
