= Ardi, Iran =

Village in Ardabil province, Iran

Ardi Persian: اردي
- Village
- Location within Iran
- Coordinates: 38°16′39″N 48°14′24″E
- Country: Iran
- Province: Ardabil
- County: Ardabil
- District: Central
- Rural District: Kalkhuran

Population (2016)
  - Total: 163
- Time zone: UTC+3:30 (IRST)

Ardi (Persian: اردي) (Note: Also romanized as Ārdī) is a village in Kalkhuran Rural District of the Central District in Ardabil County, Ardabil province, Iran.

== Demographics ==
=== Population ===
At the time of the 2006 National Census, the village's population was 216 in 54 households. The following census in 2011 counted 223 people in 63 households. The 2016 census measured the population of the village as 163 people in 50 households.
