= Qasem Qeshlaqi, Ardabil =

Village in Ardabil province, Iran

Qasem Qeshlaqi Persian: قاسم قشلاقي
- Village
- Location within Iran
- Coordinates: 38°10′19″N 48°11′46″E
- Country: Iran
- Province: Ardabil
- County: Ardabil
- District: Central
- Rural District: Balghelu

Population (2016)
  - Total: 195
- Time zone: UTC+3:30 (IRST)

Qasem Qeshlaqi (Persian: قاسم قشلاقي) (Note: Also romanized as Qāsem Qeshlāqī; also known as Ḩājjī Salīm-e Qeshlāqī) is a village in Balghelu Rural District of the Central District in Ardabil County, Ardabil province, Iran.

== Demographics ==
=== Population ===
At the time of the 2006 National Census, the village's population was 131 in 36 households. The following census in 2011 counted 134 people in 38 households. The 2016 census measured the population of the village as 195 people in 59 households.
