= Ahmad ibn Muhammad Ardabili =

Iranian Shia Grand Ayatollah (c. 1500–1585)

- احمد بن محمد اردبیلی
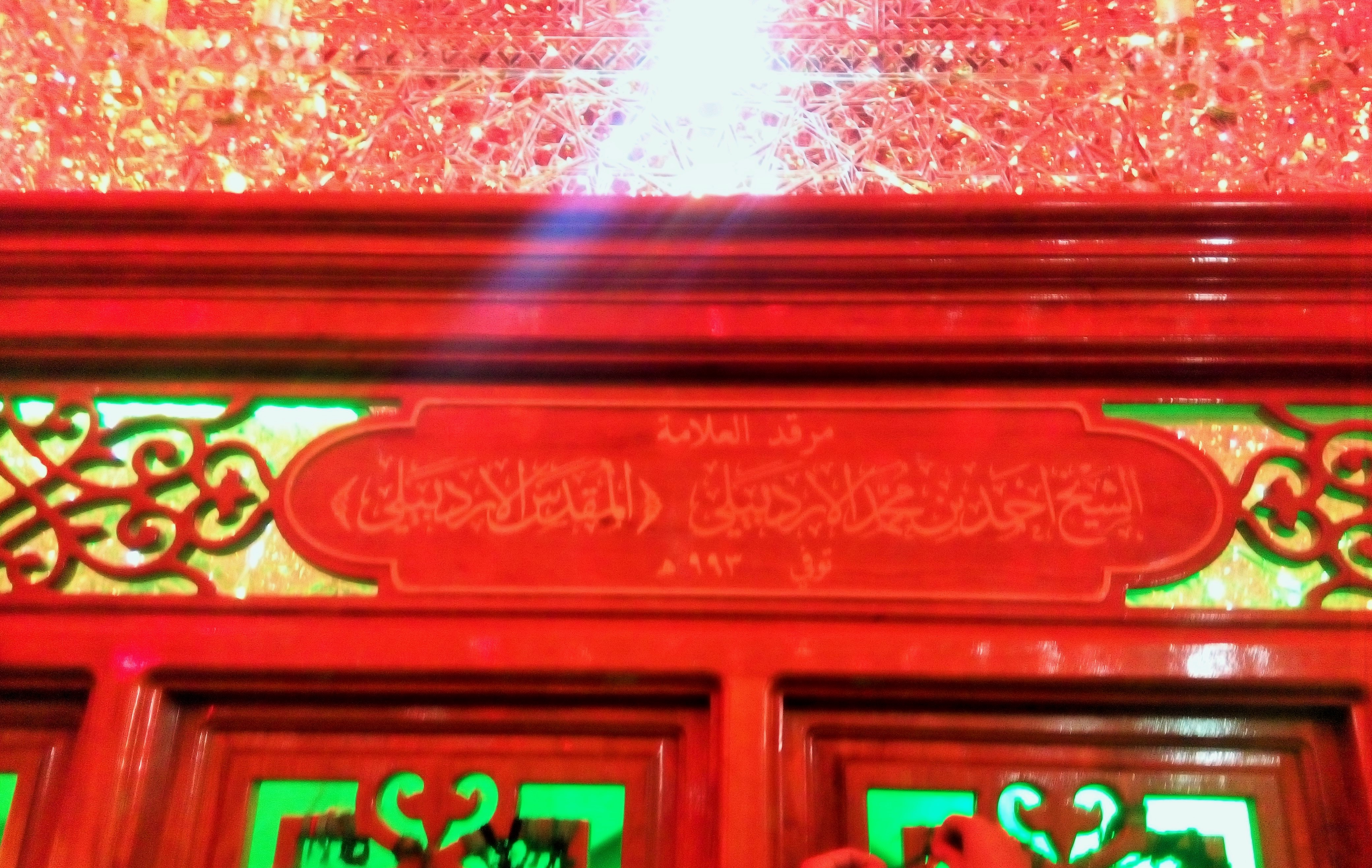
- Shrine of Ahmad ibn Muhammad Ardabili in Najaf, Iraq

Personal life
- Born: 10th century AH (16th century CE) Niar, near Ardabil, Aq Qoyunlu (present-day Iranian Azerbaijan)
- Died: Ṣafar 993 AH (February 1585 CE) Najaf, Ottoman Iraq
- Resting place: Imam Ali Shrine, Najaf
- Flourished: 16th century
- Era: Early Safavid period
- Region: Persia (modern-day Iran)
- Main interest(s): Fiqh, Usul al-fiqh, Islamic theology, Quranic exegesis
- Other names: al-Muqaddas al-Ardabili, Müqəddəs Ərdəbili, al-Muhaqqiq al-Ardabili
- Occupation: Islamic jurist, theologian

Religious life
- Religion: Islam
- Denomination: Shia
- Sect: Twelver
- Jurisprudence: Ja'fari
- Profession: Islamic scholar

Muslim leader
- Post: Marjaʿ of the Twelver Shia in Najaf
- Influenced by: Jamal al-Din Mahmud Shirazi, Sayyid Ali al-Saigh al-Jazayini
- Influenced: Sayyid Muhammad ibn Ali al-Amili, al-Hasan ibn Zayn al-Din al-Amili, Mulla Abdullah al-Tustari, Sayyid Fayzallah al-Tafreshi, Inayat Allah Kuhpayi'i, Amir Allam, Muhammad ibn Muhammad Ballaghi

Ahmad ibn Muhammad Ardabili (Persian: احمد بن محمد اردبیلی; c. 1500–1585) was a Shia Grand Ayatollah of jurisprudence. After the death of Zayn al-Din al-Juba'i al'Amili, he became the Marja' of the Twelver Shia in Najaf, Iraq. He is known by the titles of Mohaghegh and Muoghaddas.

== Life and education ==
Ahmad was born in the Safavid era (16th century) in Niar, Ardabil, Azerbaijan in Iran. He moved to Najaf and continued his education. He moved to Shiraz to study philosophy under Jamal al-Din Mahmud, a student of Jalaladdin Davani. Mohaghegh studied intellectual sciences and Fiqh in the seminary of Najaf. He gave up teaching intellectual subjects during the last years of his life and taught narrative sciences at Najaf. The seminary of Najaf thrived under his management.

== Titles ==
Ahmad ibn Muhammad Ardabili was called Mohaghegh (researcher) by other scholars because of his skills. He was also called Moghaddas (saint) by those close to him.

== Moghaddas Ardabili and Safavid dynasty ==
The Safavid dynasty sent a message by Bahāʾ al-dīn al-ʿĀmilī and requested Ardabili to move to Iran from Najaf. Although, he refused Shah Abbas Safavi's request to move to Iran, he remained connected with the Safavid court. He resolved problems of Shiites by writing letters to the Safavid kings. He also played an important role in spreading Shia religion during the Safavid era.

== Scholarly works ==
Mohaghegh Ardabili wrote scholarly works on Fiqh, the intellectual sciences, Principles of Islamic jurisprudence, theology, and Ahl al-Bayt's life. He also wrote one of the major Shia Quran commentaries. He wrote several books in Persian, such as Proof of the Imamah, Proof of the Farz, Manasek of Hajj. His works include

- Zubdat al-Bayan fi Ayat al-Ahkam, a treatise about the juridical verses of the Quran.
- Majma al-Faedeh val-Borhan fi Sharh al-Adhhan, an encyclopedia of inferential jurisprudence.
- Estynas al-manawiyyah, a manuscript detailing the history of Islam
- Bahr al-Manaqib.

== Death ==
Ahmad ibn Muhammad Ardabili died in 1585 (993 AH) and was buried in Imam Ali Mosque in Najaf.

== Legacy ==
In 1978, University of Mohaghegh Ardabili (UMA) was established in Ardabil and named in honour of Ahmad ibn Muhammad Ardabili.

== See also ==
- University of Mohaghegh Ardabili
