= Samian, Iran =

Village in Ardabil province, Iran

Samian Persian: ساميان
- Village
- Location within Iran
- Coordinates: 38°22′12″N 48°14′35″E
- Country: Iran
- Province: Ardabil
- County: Ardabil
- District: Central
- Rural District: Kalkhuran

Population (2016)
  - Total: 891
- Time zone: UTC+3:30 (IRST)

Samian (Persian: ساميان) (Note: Also romanized as Sāmeyān, Sāmīān, and Sāmīyān) is a village in Kalkhuran Rural District of the Central District in Ardabil County, Ardabil province, Iran.

== Demographics ==
=== Population ===
At the time of the 2006 National Census, the village's population was 1,070 in 206 households. The following census in 2011 counted 1,017 people in 247 households. The 2016 census measured the population of the village as 891 people in 255 households.
