= Samiyan =

Samiyan may refer to:

- Semichi Islands
- Samian, Iran

== See also ==
- Samiyam
