= Shisheh Garan =

Village in Ardabil province, Iran

Shisheh Garan Persian: شيشه گران
- Village
- Location within Iran
- Coordinates: 38°19′58″N 48°04′57″E
- Country: Iran
- Province: Ardabil
- County: Ardabil
- District: Central
- Rural District: Sardabeh

Population (2016)
  - Total: 134
- Time zone: UTC+3:30 (IRST)

Shisheh Garan (Persian: شيشه گران) (Note: Also romanized as Shīsheh Garān) is a village in Sardabeh Rural District of the Central District in Ardabil County, Ardabil province, Iran.

== Demographics ==
=== Population ===
At the time of the 2006 National Census, the village's population was 250 in 53 households. The following census in 2011 counted 220 people in 57 households. The 2016 census measured the population of the village as 134 people in 40 households.
