= Mirani, Iran =

Village in Ardabil province, Iran

Mirani Persian: ميرني
- Village
- Location within Iran
- Coordinates: 38°18′50″N 48°11′46″E
- Country: Iran
- Province: Ardabil
- County: Ardabil
- District: Central
- Rural District: Sardabeh

Population (2016)
  - Total: 122
- Time zone: UTC+3:30 (IRST)

Mirani (Persian: ميرني) (Note: Also romanized as Mīranī; also known as Mārānī) is a village in Sardabeh Rural District of the Central District in Ardabil County, Ardabil province, Iran.

== Demographics ==
=== Population ===
At the time of the 2006 National Census, the village's population was 129 in 30 households. The following census in 2011 counted 125 people in 38 households. The 2016 census measured the population of the village as 122 people in 40 households.
