= Hasanali Kandi =

Village in Ardabil province, Iran

Hasanali Kandi Persian: حسنعلي كندي
- Village
- Location within Iran
- Coordinates: 38°15′54″N 48°03′37″E
- Country: Iran
- Province: Ardabil
- County: Ardabil
- District: Central
- Rural District: Sardabeh

Population (2016)
  - Total: 180
- Time zone: UTC+3:30 (IRST)

Hasanali Kandi (Persian: حسنعلي كندي) (Note: Also romanized as Ḩasan‘alī Kandī) is a village in Sardabeh Rural District of the Central District in Ardabil County, Ardabil province, Iran.

== Demographics ==
=== Population ===
At the time of the 2006 National Census, the village's population was 213 in 39 households. The following census in 2011 counted 185 people in 48 households. The 2016 census measured the population of the village as 180 people in 51 households.
