= Qunakh Qiran Castle =

Castle in Ardabil Province, Iran

- قلعه قوناخ قیران

General information
- Type: Castle
- Location: Ardabil County, Iran

Qunakh Qiran Castle (Persian: قلعه قوناخ قیران) is a historical castle located in Ardabil County in Ardabil Province, The longevity of this fortress dates back to the Sasanian Empire.
