= Dashlujeh, Ardabil =

Village in Ardabil province, Iran

Dashlujeh Persian: داشلوجه
- Village
- Location within Iran
- Coordinates: 38°26′56″N 48°15′50″E
- Country: Iran
- Province: Ardabil
- County: Ardabil
- District: Central
- Rural District: Arshaq-e Sharqi

Population (2016)
  - Total: 60
- Time zone: UTC+3:30 (IRST)

Dashlujeh (Persian: داشلوجه) (Note: Also romanized as Dāshlūjeh) is a village in Arshaq-e Sharqi Rural District of the Central District in Ardabil County, Ardabil province, Iran.

== Demographics ==
=== Population ===
At the time of the 2006 National Census, the village's population was 96 in 18 households. The following census in 2011 counted 49 people in 12 households. The 2016 census measured the population of the village as 60 people in 16 households.
