= Pir Alqar =

Village in Ardabil province, Iran

Pir Alqar Persian: پيرالقير
- Village
- Location within Iran
- Coordinates: 38°10′57″N 48°10′10″E
- Country: Iran
- Province: Ardabil
- County: Ardabil
- District: Central
- Rural District: Balghelu

Population (2016)
  - Total: 315
- Time zone: UTC+3:30 (IRST)

Pir Alqar (Persian: پيرالقير) (Note: Also romanized as Pīr Ālqar and Pīrāl Qīr) is a village in Balghelu Rural District of the Central District in Ardabil County, Ardabil province, Iran.

== Demographics ==
=== Population ===
At the time of the 2006 National Census, the village's population was 432 in 96 households. The following census in 2011 counted 365 people in 104 households. The 2016 census measured the population of the village as 315 people in 97 households.
