= Arshaq-e Sharqi Rural District =

Rural district in Ardabil province, Iran

Arshaq-e Sharqi Rural District Persian: دهستان ارشق شرقی
- Rural District
- Location within Iran
- Coordinates: 38°31′N 48°12′E
- Country: Iran
- Province: Ardabil
- County: Ardabil
- District: Central
- Established: 1988
- Capital: Taqi Dizaj

Population (2016)
  - Total: 3,403
- Time zone: UTC+3:30 (IRST)

Arshaq-e Sharqi Rural District (Persian: دهستان ارشق شرقی) is in the Central District of Ardabil County, Ardabil province, Iran. Its capital is the village of Taqi Dizaj.

== Demographics ==
=== Population ===
At the time of the 2006 National Census, the rural district's population was 5,856 in 1,164 households. There were 4,400 inhabitants in 1,144 households at the following census of 2011. The 2016 census measured the population of the rural district as 3,403 in 970 households. The most populous of its 28 villages was Taleb Qeshlaqi, with 1,409 people.

=== Other villages in the rural district ===
- Allahlu
- Aq Qaleh
- Bayram Badani
- Chaghungenesh
- Chat Qayah
- Dalikli Dash
- Dashlujeh
- Gol Tappeh
- Imir
- Jamayran
- Kaftareh
- Khalaj
- Khvajeh Bolaghi
- Mohammad Janlu
- Naqdi Kandi
- Pir Alvan
- Qeshlaq-e Owch Bolagh
- Savoj Bolagh
- Sharif Beyglu
- Sorkhanlu
- Tahmasebabad
