= Kalkhuran Rural District =

Rural district in Ardabil province, Iran

Kalkhuran Rural District Persian: دهستان كلخوران
- Rural District
- Location within Iran
- Coordinates: 38°19′N 48°20′E
- Country: Iran
- Province: Ardabil
- County: Ardabil
- District: Central
- Established: 1988

Population (2016)
  - Total: 10,048
- Time zone: UTC+3:30 (IRST)

Kalkhuran Rural District (Persian: دهستان كلخوران) is in the Central District of Ardabil County, Ardabil province, Iran. Its capital was Kalkhuran Sheykh until the village was annexed by the city of Ardabil after the 2006 National Census.

== Demographics ==
=== Population ===
At the time of the 2006 census, the rural district's population was 13,564 in 3,100 households. There were 9,991 inhabitants in 2,662 households at the following census of 2011. The 2016 census measured the population of the rural district as 10,048 in 2,978 households. The most populous of its 13 villages was Soltanabad, with 1,830 people.

=== Other villages in the rural district ===
- Anzab-e Olya
- Aqcheh Kand
- Ardi
- Gilan Deh
- Karkaraq
- Qarahlar
- Samian
- Sowmaeh
- Tazeh Kand-e Rezaabad
- Tazeh Kand-e Sharifabad
