= Balghelu Rural District =

Rural district in Ardabil province, Iran

Balghelu Rural District Persian: دهستان بالغلو
- Rural District
- Location within Iran
- Coordinates: 38°09′N 48°13′E
- Country: Iran
- Province: Ardabil
- County: Ardabil
- District: Central
- Established: 1988
- Capital: Sham Asbi

Population (2016)
  - Total: 8,054
- Time zone: UTC+3:30 (IRST)

Balghelu Rural District (Persian: دهستان بالغلو) is in the Central District of Ardabil County, Ardabil province, Iran. Its capital is the village of Sham Asbi.

== Demographics ==
=== Population ===
At the time of the 2006 National Census, the rural district's population was 21,368 in 4,966 households. There were 7,297 inhabitants in 1,987 households at the following census of 2011. The 2016 census measured the population of the rural district as 8,054 in 2,334 households. The most populous of its 18 villages was Sham Asbi, with 2,817 people.

=== Other villages in the rural district ===
- Almas
- Aski Shahr
- Banafsheh Daraq
- Goli
- Hakim Qeshlaqi
- Hasan Baruq
- Kharabeh-ye Kohal
- Nuran
- Pir Alqar
- Qasem Qeshlaqi
- Qelichi
- Rowshanaq
- Vareh Now
- Zardalu
