= Sharqi Rural District =

Rural district in Ardabil province, Iran

Sharqi Rural District Persian: دهستان شرقی
- Rural District
- Location within Iran
- Coordinates: 38°13′N 48°23′E
- Country: Iran
- Province: Ardabil
- County: Ardabil
- District: Central
- Established: 1988

Population (2016)
  - Total: 7,962
- Time zone: UTC+3:30 (IRST)

Sharqi Rural District (Persian: دهستان شرقی) is in the Central District of Ardabil County, Ardabil province, Iran. Its capital was the village of Niar until the village was annexed by the city of Ardabil after the 2006 National Census.

== Demographics ==
=== Population ===
At the time of the 2006 census, the rural district's population was 17,420 in 4,144 households. There were 8,729 inhabitants in 2,411 households at the following census of 2011. The 2016 census measured the population of the rural district as 7,962 in 2,362 households. The most populous of its 10 villages was Aq Bolagh-e Rostam Khani, with 1,929 people.

=== Other villages in the rural district ===
- Aq Bolagh-e Aqajan Khan
- Aqa Baqer
- Chanzanaq
- Hamidabad
- Kamiabad
- Pir Aquam
- Raziabad
- Topraqlu
