= Sardabeh Rural District =

Rural district in Ardabil province, Iran

Sardabeh Rural District Persian: دهستان سردابه
- Rural District
- Location within Iran
- Coordinates: 38°18′N 48°02′E
- Country: Iran
- Province: Ardabil
- County: Ardabil
- District: Central
- Established: 1988
- Capital: Khoshkeh Rud

Population (2016)
  - Total: 19,396
- Time zone: UTC+3:30 (IRST)

Sardabeh Rural District (Persian: دهستان سردابه) is in the Central District of Ardabil County, Ardabil province, Iran. Its capital is the village of Khoshkeh Rud.

== Demographics ==
=== Population ===
At the time of the 2006 National Census, the rural district's population was 20,579 in 4,567 households. There were 20,446 inhabitants in 5,399 households at the following census of 2011. The 2016 census measured the population of the rural district as 19,396 in 5,591 households. The most populous of its 41 villages was Khiarak, with 3,287 people.

=== Other villages in the rural district ===
- Amuqin
- Arvanaq
- Baruq
- Chehel Gaz
- Chenaqrud
- Dijujin
- Divlaq
- Garjan
- Gonsul Kandi
- Hamlabad
- Hasanali Kandi
- Jamadi
- Kord Kandi
- Mirani
- Omidcheh
- Qaleh Juq-e Sabalan
- Qarah Tappeh-ye Sabalan
- Sardabeh
- Shahrivar
- Shamshir Khaneh
- Shisheh Garan
- Vakilabad
- Yengejeh-ye Reza Beyglu
