= Chat Qayah, East Azerbaijan =

Chat Qayah چات قيه
- Village
- Location within Iran
- Coordinates: 39°09′00″N 47°16′55″E
- Country: Iran
- Province: East Azerbaijan
- County: Kaleybar
- Bakhsh: Abish Ahmad
- Rural District: Qeshlaq

Population (2006)
  - Total: 174
- Time zone: UTC+3:30 (IRST)
  - Summer (DST): UTC+4:30 (IRDT)

Chat Qayah (Persian: چات قيه, also Romanized as Chāt Qayah) is a village in Qeshlaq Rural District, Abish Ahmad District, Kaleybar County, East Azerbaijan Province, Iran. At the 2006 census, its population was 174, in 43 families.
