= Mirani, Sindh =

Mirani
- Location within Pakistan
- Coordinates: 27.14°N 68.39°E
- Country: Pakistan
- Province: Sindh
- Elevation: 38 m (125 ft)
- Time zone: UTC+5 (PST)

Mirani is a town in the Sindh province of Pakistan. It is located at 27°14'45N 68°39'20E with an altitude of 38 metres (127 feet).

Mirani is also the name of a caste in Sindh.
