= Dana Beth Ardi =

American entrepreneur

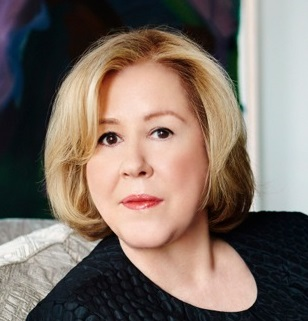
- Born: Dana Beth Silverstein; New York City, US
- Education: State University of New York at Buffalo; Boston College
- Occupations: Entrepreneur, Corporate anthropologist, author
- Board member of: AMC Entertainment, Inc. (2009–2012); Officer, Creative Arts Council, Museum of Modern Art, New York; Advisory Board, Grapevine (UK); Leadership Council, New York Foundation for the Arts
- Spouse: Dennis Ardi (m. 1973)
- Website: corporateanthropologyadvisors.com

Dana Beth Ardi (née Silverstein) is an American entrepreneur, venture capitalist, human capitalist, author, and contemporary art collector.

Considered an expert in the field of talent management and organizational design, Ardi is the author of The Fall of the Alphas: The New Beta Way to Connect, Collaborate, Influence—and Lead. She is best known as a corporate anthropologist, which is a human capital practice she developed.

== Early life and education ==
Ardi spent her childhood in Manhattan, New York. She developed an interest in art at an early age, when her father, Jack Silverstein, owned a haberdashery that was greatly embraced by the art community. Ardi started taking courses at MoMA, a period where she joined a handful of museum groups and began to self educate herself. In 1967, after the 1966 Flood of the Arno River, Ardi traveled to Florence, Italy, where she volunteered as a mud angel, recovering and restoring damaged art throughout the city. Following her experience in Florence, she studied Renaissance art and art history at the University of Siena. Ardi earned a Bachelor of Science from the State University of New York at Buffalo, and a Master of Education and Doctorate from Boston College.

== Career ==
After receiving her PhD, Ardi began a career in special education, working in Boston and New York, and serving as an assistant professor of education at Fordham University's Graduate School of Education. In 1983, she was hired by McGraw-Hill Productions, which marked the start of Ardi's career in traditional and developing media. In 1994, Ardi was hired by R.R. Donnelly and Sons, where she led the company's new media initiatives, and, in 1995, she was appointed managing director, Partner, and Global Practice Leader at TMP Worldwide, an executive search firm. At TMP, Ardi focused on human capital and organizational design. She left the company in 2000. Subsequently, she joined Jerry Colonna, Bob Greene and Fred Wilson at Flatiron Partners, a well-known early-stage venture capital fund, where she developed the now-standard practice of including the value of human capital into the overall determination of corporate worth. From 2000 through 2009, Ardi served as a partner and managing director at JPMorgan Partners/CCMP Capital, LLC, a private equity firm. Ardi left the company to found Corporate Anthropology Inc., a human capital and advisory firm which provides recruitment and organizational consulting to start ups, investors and corporate clients.

== Involvement in contemporary art ==
Ardi is a noted contemporary art collector and a mentor to contemporary artists and gallerists. She is a fellow of the Royal Society of the Arts, and is an officer on the Creative Arts Council of the Museum of Modern Art in New York. Additionally, she is a member of the Leadership Council of the New York Foundation for the Arts.

== Recognition ==
Ardi, who wrote the column Ask Dr. Dana for The Industry Standard from 1998-2001, is a mentor for Springboard Enterprises, a "highly-vetted expert network of innovators, investors and influencers who are dedicated to building high-growth technology-oriented companies led by women." She has been a keynote and featured speaker at conferences and seminars worldwide, including events presented by The Wall Street Journal, Digital Hollywood, and the Harvard Business School.

== Selected works ==
- The Fall of the Alphas. October 2013. St. Martin's Press, New York. ISBN 978-0-312-68193-7 (288 pp) Macmillan
