= Mirani, Balochistan =

Mirani
- Location within Pakistan
- Coordinates: 28.32°N 66.19°E
- Country: Pakistan
- Province: Balochistan
- Elevation: 1,877 m (6,158 ft)
- Time zone: UTC+5 (PST)

Mirani is a town in the Balochistan province of Pakistan. It is located at 28°32'20N 66°19'20E with an altitude of 1877 metres (6161 feet).
