= Shisheh, East Azerbaijan =

Shisheh شيشه
- Village
- Location within Iran
- Coordinates: 38°36′05″N 47°21′09″E
- Country: Iran
- Province: East Azerbaijan
- County: Ahar
- Bakhsh: Central
- Rural District: Vargahan

Population (2006)
  - Total: 87
- Time zone: UTC+3:30 (IRST)
  - Summer (DST): UTC+4:30 (IRDT)

Shisheh (Persian: شيشه) is a village in Vargahan Rural District, in the Central District of Ahar County, East Azerbaijan Province, Iran.

At the 2006 census, its population was 87, in 22 families.
