= Dashlujeh, East Azerbaijan =

Dashlujeh داشلوجه
- Village
- Location within Iran
- Coordinates: 38°24′02″N 47°09′16″E
- Country: Iran
- Province: East Azerbaijan
- County: Ahar
- Bakhsh: Central
- Rural District: Bozkosh

Population (2006)
  - Total: 107
- Time zone: UTC+3:30 (IRST)
  - Summer (DST): UTC+4:30 (IRDT)

Dashlujeh (Persian: داشلوجه, also Romanized as Dāshlūjeh) is a village in Bozkosh Rural District, in the Central District of Ahar County, East Azerbaijan Province, Iran. At the 2006 census, its population was 107, in 25 families.
