= Elqar =

Elqar القار
- Village
- Location within Iran
- Coordinates: 32°54′54.3″N 59°32′10.4″E
- Country: Iran
- Province: South Khorasan
- County: Birjand
- Bakhsh: Central
- Rural District: Kahshang

Population (2016)
  - Total: 123
- Time zone: UTC+3:30 (IRST)
  - Summer (DST): UTC+4:30 (IRDT)

Elqar (Persian: القار, also Romanized as Elqār, Alghār, Alqār, Ilghār, and Olqār) is a village in Kahshang Rural District, in the Central District of Birjand County, South Khorasan Province, Iran. At the 2016 census, its population was 123, in 50 families.
