= Ali Qeshlaqi, East Azerbaijan =

Ali Qeshlaqi علي قشلاقي
- Village
- Location within Iran
- Coordinates: 37°34′22″N 47°56′27″E
- Country: Iran
- Province: East Azerbaijan
- County: Meyaneh
- Bakhsh: Central
- Rural District: Garmeh-ye Jonubi

Population (2006)
  - Total: 72
- Time zone: UTC+3:30 (IRST)
  - Summer (DST): UTC+4:30 (IRDT)

Ali Qeshlaqi (Persian: علي قشلاقي, also Romanized as ‘Alī Qeshlāqī; also known as ‘Alī Qeshlāq) is a village in Garmeh-ye Jonubi Rural District, in the Central District of Meyaneh County, East Azerbaijan Province, Iran. At the 2006 census, its population was 72, in 13 families.
