= University of Mohaghegh Ardabili =

Academic publisher, public university

Coordinates: 38°12′35″N 48°17′57″E

- دانشگاه محقق اردبیلی; Danushgah-e Miheqeq Ardâbili
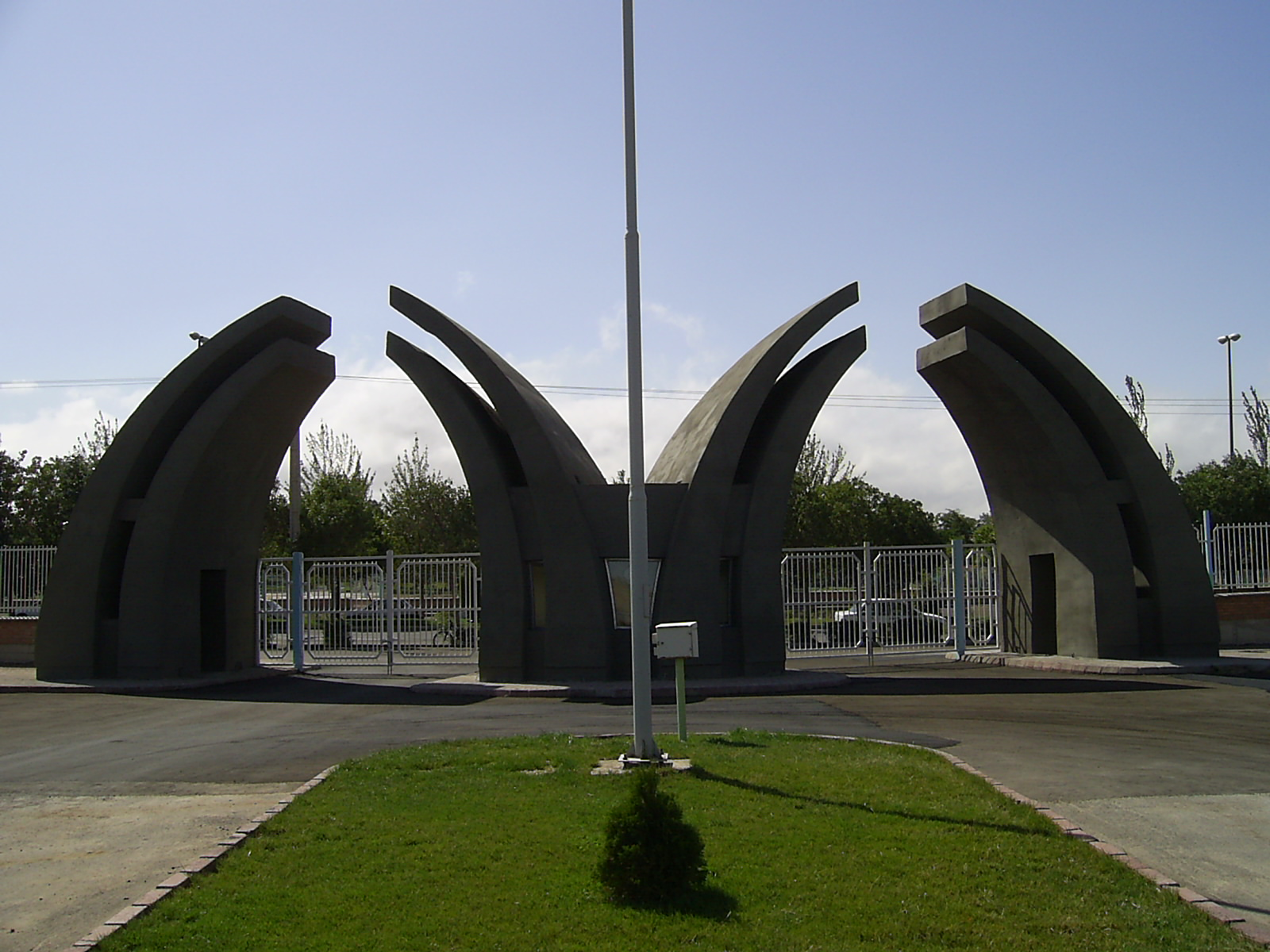
- Former names: The Agricultural Institute (آموزشکده کشاورزی), 1996–1978
- Type: Public university
- Established: 1978
- Chancellor: Dr. Mohammad Hassanzadeh
- Faculty: 395
- Students: 11,000
- Undergraduates: 8,282
- Postgraduates: 2,718
- Location: Ardabil, Ardabil province, Iran
- Campus: Urban
- Athletics: 8 teams
- Website: www.uma.ac.ir

The University of Mohaghegh Ardabili (UMA) formerly known as University of Ardabil, is a public university in Ardabil province, Iran.

The university was established in 1978 as a college of agriculture (آموزشکده کشاورزی) under the supervision of Tabriz University. It became a separate, independent university in 1996.

Mohaghegh Ardabili offers a range of undergraduate and graduate programs. With more than 11,000 students and 395 full-time faculty members, Mohaghegh Ardabili University has 11 faculties, 3 research centers, and 11 research groups. As of 2022, the university admitted students in 273 fields in 11 faculties, which 61 of them were doctoral candidates, 128 were master's students and the rest were undergraduate students.

== Gallery ==
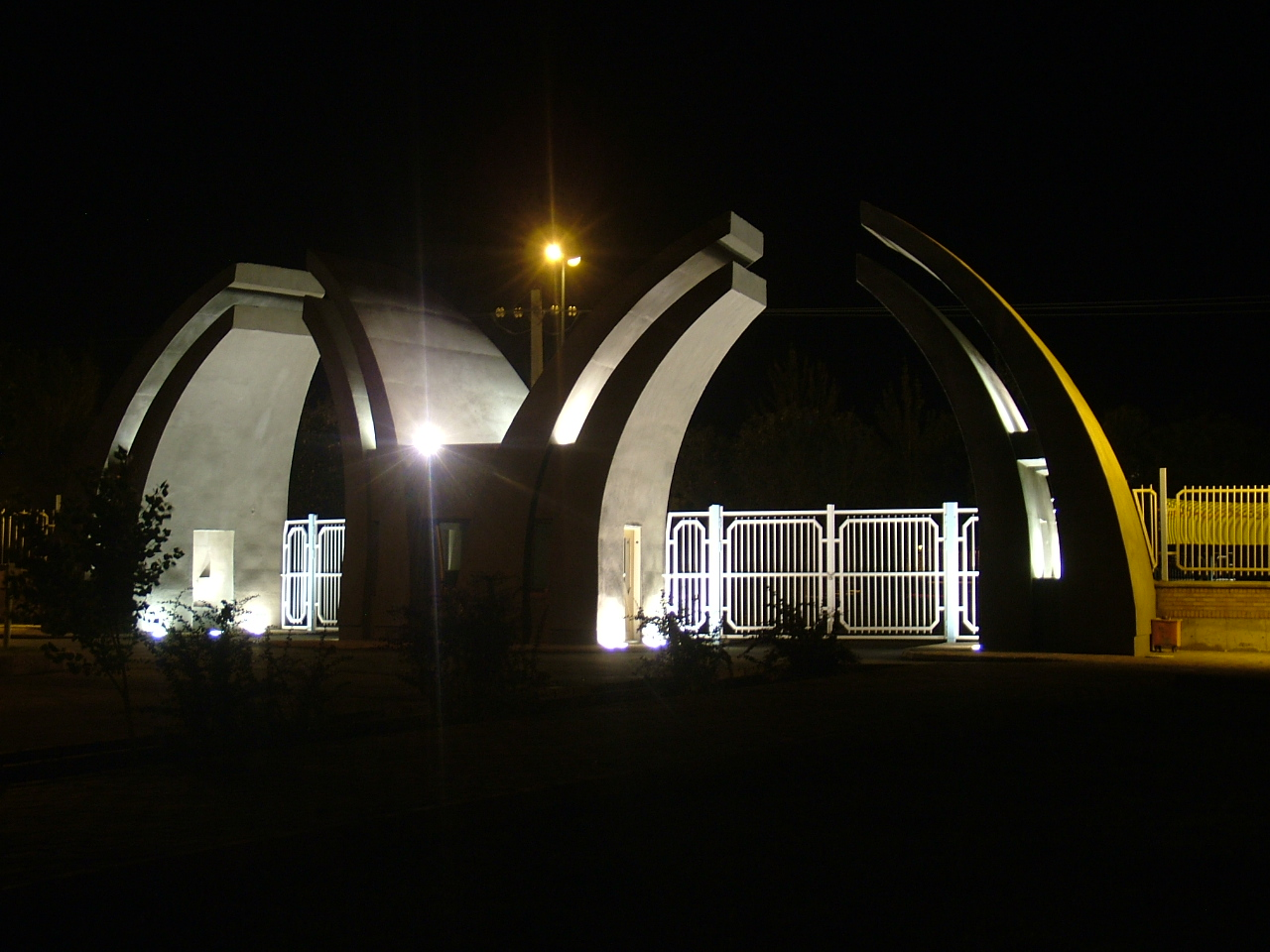
UMA main entrance 2

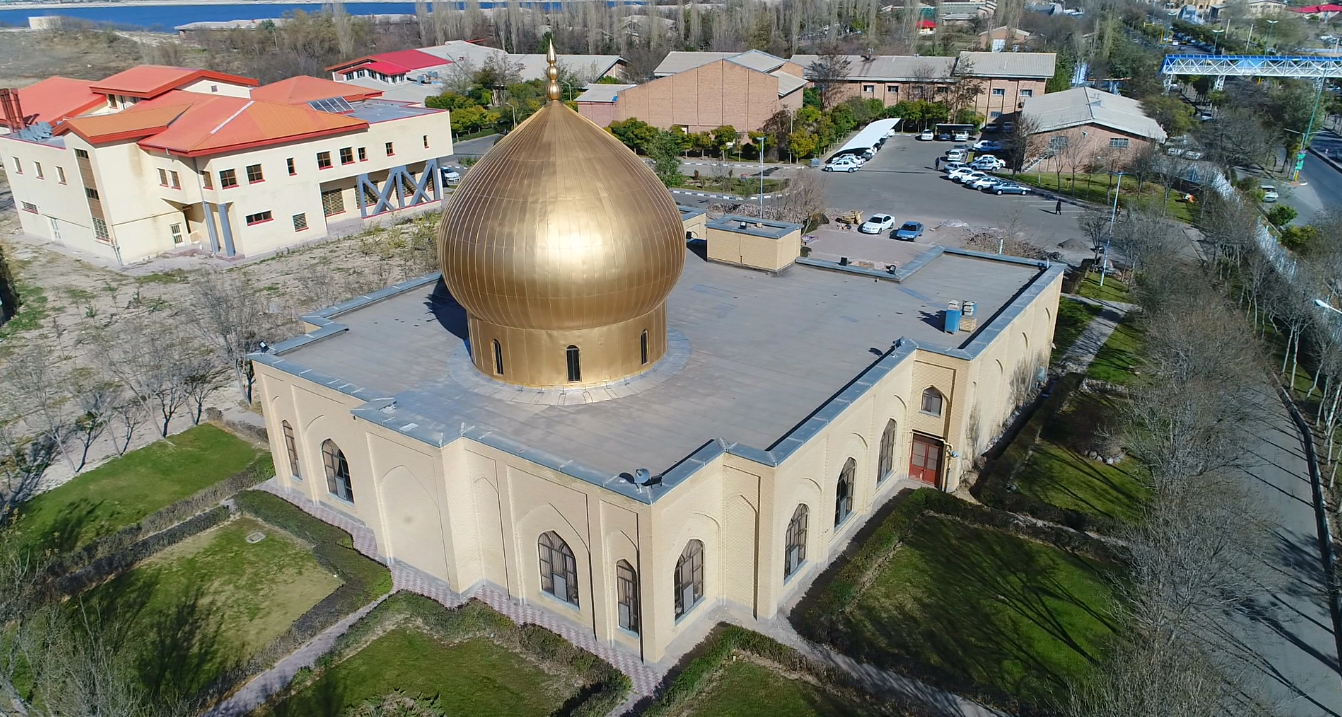
UMA Mosque Aerial View

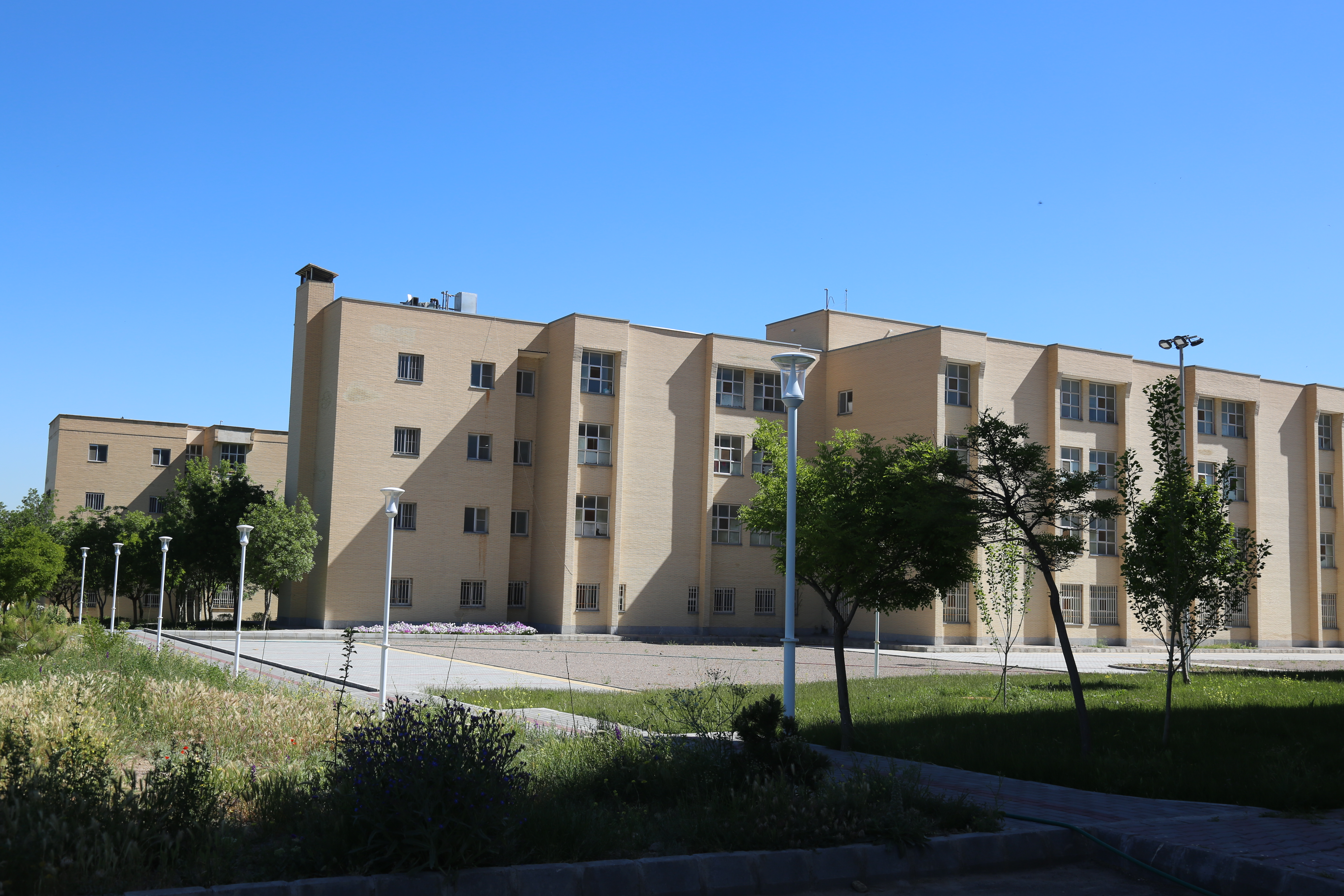
Faculty of Sciences

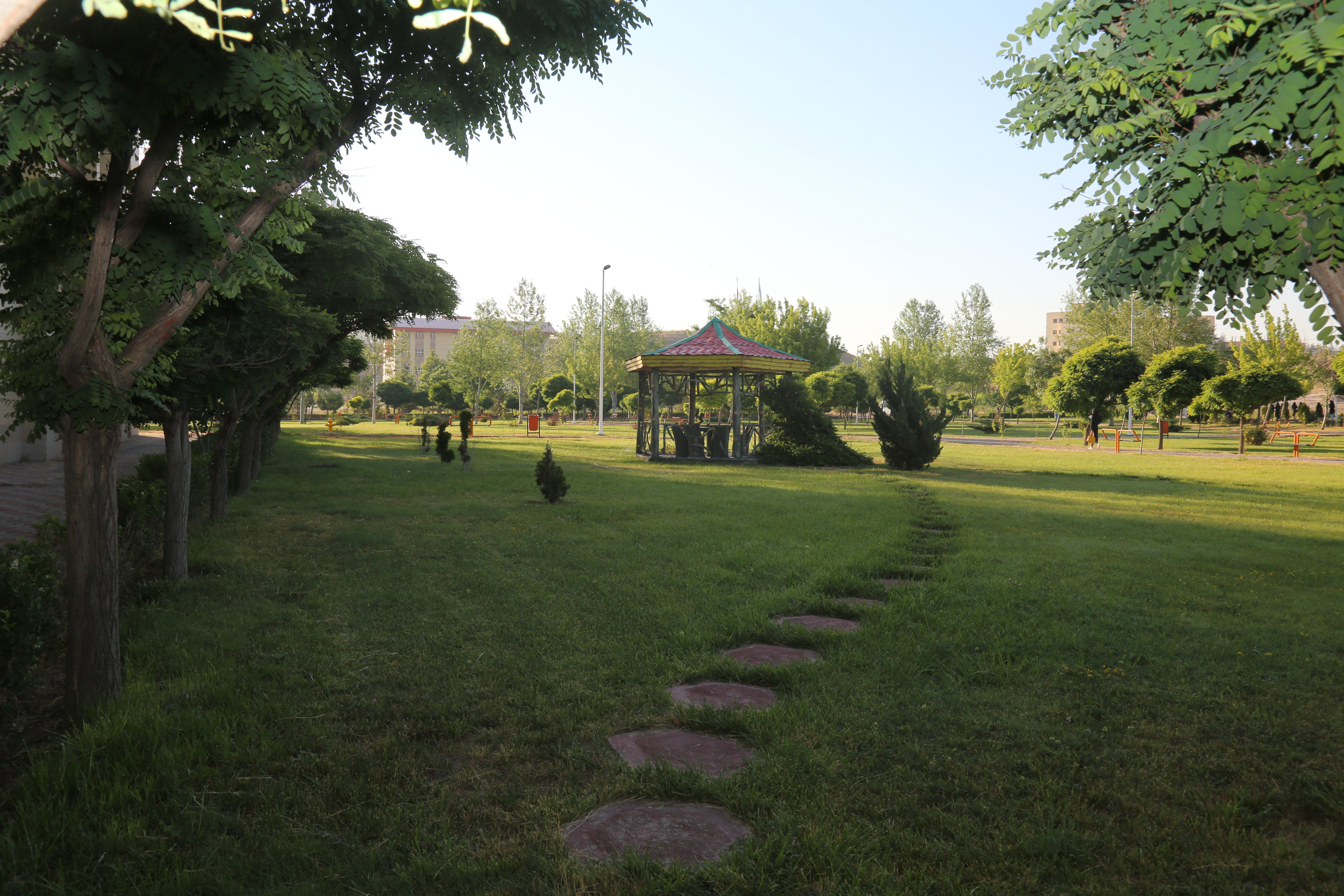
University Campus

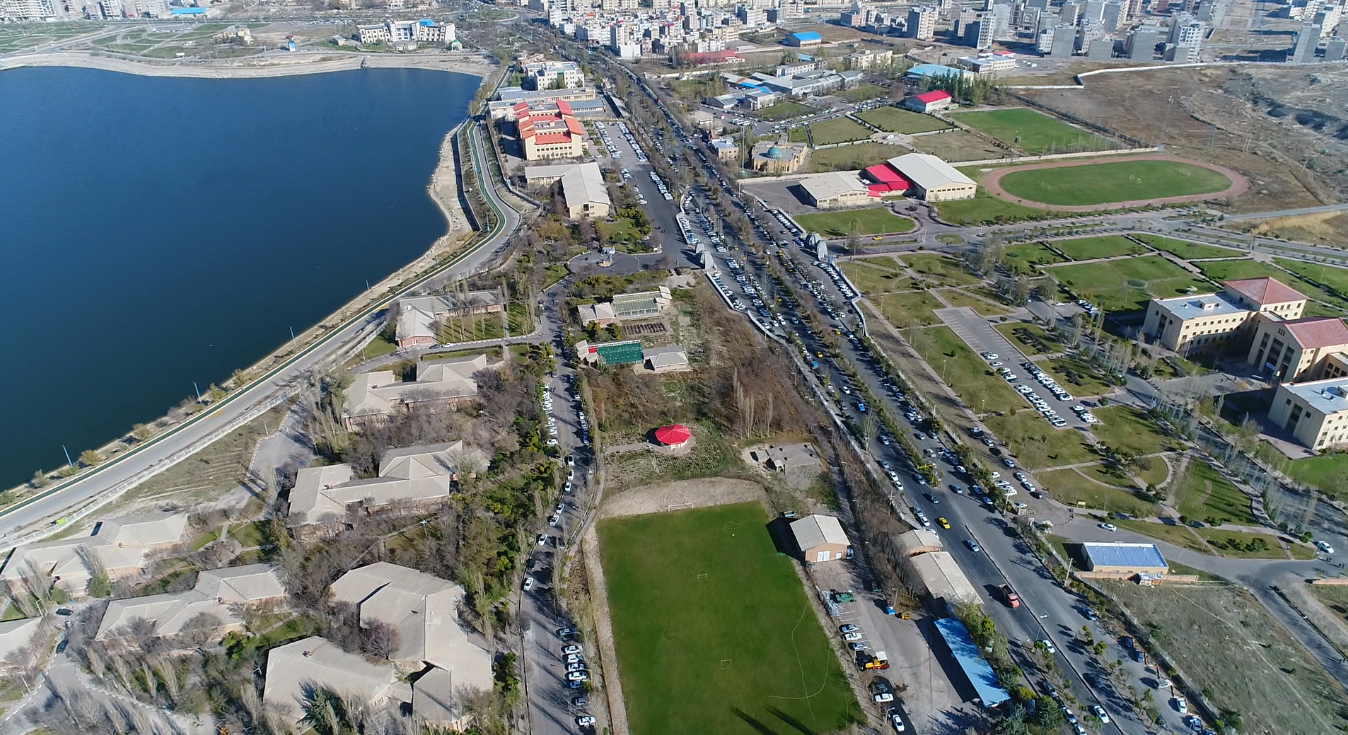
Main Campus Aerial View

== See also ==
- Higher education in Iran
- List of universities in Iran
