= Gharbi Rural District =

Rural district in Ardabil province, Iran

Gharbi Rural District Persian: دهستان غربی
- Rural District
- Location within Iran
- Coordinates: 38°22′N 48°09′E
- Country: Iran
- Province: Ardabil
- County: Ardabil
- District: Samarin
- Established: 1988
- Capital: Samarin

Population (2016)
  - Total: 4,936
- Time zone: UTC+3:30 (IRST)

Gharbi Rural District (Persian: دهستان غربی) is in Samarin District of Ardabil County, Ardabil province, Iran. It is administered from the city of Samarin.

== Demographics ==
=== Population ===
At the time of the 2006 National Census, the rural district's population (as a part of the Central District) was 10,730 in 2,291 households. The following census of 2011 counted 4,975 inhabitants in 1,389 households, by which time the rural district had been separated from the district in the formation of Samarin District. The 2016 census measured the population of the rural district as 4,936 in 1,389 households. The most populous of its seven villages was Samarin (now a city), with 2,326 people.

=== Other villages in the rural district ===
- Jabah Dar
- Kord Qeshlaqi
- Masmumabad
- Mokhtarabad
- Tazeh Kand-e Mohammadiyeh
