= Samarin District =

District in Ardabil province, Iran

Samarin District Persian: بخش ثمرین
- District
- Location within Iran
- Coordinates: 38°24′N 48°06′E
- Country: Iran
- Province: Ardabil
- County: Ardabil
- Established: 2010
- Capital: Samarin

Population (2016)
  - Total: 8,471
- Time zone: UTC+3:30 (IRST)

Samarin District (Persian: بخش ثمرین) is in Ardabil County, Ardabil province, Iran. Its capital is the city of Samarin.

== History ==
In 2010, Gharbi Rural District was separated from the Central District in the formation of Samarin District. The village of Samarin was elevated to the status of a city in 2018.

== Demographics ==
=== Population ===
At the time of the 2011 National Census, the district's population was 9,161 people in 2,314 households. The 2016 census measured the population of the district as 8,471 inhabitants living in 2,452 households.

=== Administrative divisions ===
Samarin District Population
Administrative Divisions	2011	2016
Dujaq RD	4,186	3,535
Gharbi RD	4,975	4,936
Samarin (city) (Note: Became a city after the 2016 census)		
Total	9,161	8,471
RD = Rural District
