= Central District (Ardabil County) =

District in Ardabil province, Iran

Central District (Ardabil County) Persian: بخش مرکزی شهرستان اردبیل
- District
- Location within Iran
- Coordinates: 38°21′N 48°15′E
- Country: Iran
- Province: Ardabil
- County: Ardabil
- Capital: Ardabil

Population (2016)
  - Total: 578,237
- Time zone: UTC+3:30 (IRST)

The Central District of Ardabil County (Persian: بخش مرکزی شهرستان اردبیل) is in Ardabil County, Ardabil province, Iran. Its capital is the city of Ardabil.

== History ==
Gharbi Rural District was separated from the district in the formation of Samarin District in 2010.

== Demographics ==
=== Population ===
At the time of the 2006 National Census, the district's population was 502,186 in 123,050 households. The following census in 2011 counted 533,495 people in 148,318 households. The 2016 census measured the population of the district as 578,237 inhabitants living in 172,862 households.

=== Administrative divisions ===
Central District (Ardabil County) Population
Administrative Divisions	2006	2011	2016
Arshaq-e Sharqi RD	5,856	4,400	3,403
Balghelu RD	21,368	7,297	8,054
Gharbi RD (Note: Transferred to Samarin District)	10,730		
Kalkhuran RD	13,564	9,991	10,048
Sardabeh RD	20,579	20,446	19,396
Sharqi RD	17,420	8,729	7,962
Ardabil (city)	412,669	482,632	529,374
Total	502,186	533,495	578,237
RD = Rural District
