= Ardabil County =

County in Ardabil province, Iran

Ardabil County Persian: شهرستان اردبیل
- County
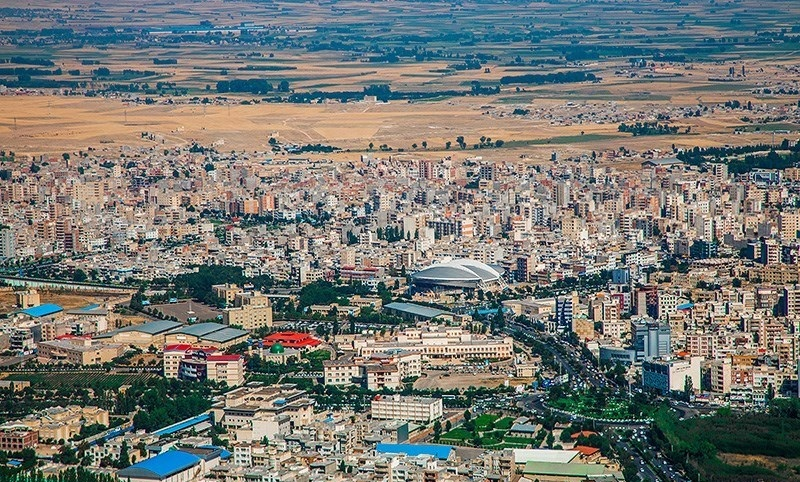
- The city of Ardabil

- Location of Ardabil County in Ardabil province (center, green)

- Location of Ardabil province in Iran
- Coordinates: 38°17′N 48°19′E
- Country: Iran
- Province: Ardabil
- Capital: Ardabil
- Districts: Central, Hir, Samarin

Area
  - Total: 2,211 km^{2} (854 sq mi)
- Elevation: 1,500 m (4,900 ft)

Population (2016)
  - Total: 605,992
  - Density: 274.1/km^{2} (709.9/sq mi)
- Time zone: UTC+3:30 (IRST)

Ardabil County (Persian: شهرستان اردبیل) is in Ardabil province, Iran. Its capital is the city of Ardabil.

== History ==
Sareyn District was separated from the county in the establishment of Sareyn County in 2009. In 2010, Gharbi Rural District was separated from the Central District in the formation of Samarin District, which included the new Dujaq Rural District.

In 2018, the village of Samarin was elevated to the status of a city, and the village of Aralluy-e Bozorg merged with another village to form the new city of Arallu in 2019.

== Demographics ==
=== Population ===
At the time of the 2006 National Census, the county's population was 542,930 in 131,950 households. The following census in 2011 counted 564,365 people in 156,242 households. The 2016 census measured the population of the county as 605,992 in 180,975 households.

== Administrative divisions ==
Ardabil County's population history and administrative structure over three consecutive censuses are shown in the following table

Ardabil County Population
Administrative Divisions	2006	2011	2016
Central District	502,186	533,495	578,237
Arshaq-e Sharqi RD	5,856	4,400	3,403
Balghelu RD	21,368	7,297	8,054
Gharbi RD	10,730		
Kalkhuran RD	13,564	9,991	10,048
Sardabeh RD	20,579	20,446	19,396
Sharqi RD	17,420	8,729	7,962
Ardabil (city)	412,669	482,632	529,374
Hir District	23,547	21,709	19,282
Fuladlui-ye Jonubi RD	3,148	2,619	2,021
Fuladlui-ye Shomali RD	9,263	9,423	9,341
Hir RD	8,548	7,146	5,840
Arallu (city) (Note: Formerly Aralluy-e Bozorg; became a city after the 2016 census)			
Hir (city)	2,588	2,521	2,080
Samarin District		9,161	8,471
Dujaq RD		4,186	3,535
Gharbi RD		4,975	4,936
Samarin (city) (Note: Became a city after the 2016 census)			
Sareyn District (Note: Transferred to Sareyn County)	17,197		
Ab-e Garm RD	7,844		
Sabalan RD	4,875		
Sareyn (city)	4,478		
Total	542,930	564,365	605,992
RD = Rural District

== See also ==
Media related to Ardabil County at Wikimedia Commons
