= Sowmeeh =

Sowmeeh or Sowmaeh or Sumaeh or Sumeeh or Sowmaah (Persian: صومعه) may refer to:

- Sowmaeh, Ardabil, Ardabil Province
- Sowmeeh, Ahar, East Azerbaijan Province
- Sowmaeh, Ajab Shir, East Azerbaijan Province
- Sowmaeh, Charuymaq, East Azerbaijan Province
- Sowmaeh, Hashtrud, East Azerbaijan Province
- Sowmaeh, Heris, East Azerbaijan Province
- Sowmaeh, Kaleybar, East Azerbaijan Province
- Sowmeeh, Maragheh, East Azerbaijan Province
- Sowmaeh Del, East Azerbaijan Province
- Sowmaeh-ye Olya, Maragheh, East Azerbaijan Province
- Sowmaeh-ye Sofla, Maragheh, East Azerbaijan Province
- Sowmaeh-ye Olya, Meyaneh, East Azerbaijan Province
- Sowmaeh-ye Sofla, Meyaneh, East Azerbaijan Province
- Sowmaeh Zarrin, Mehraban, East Azerbaijan Province
- Sowmaeh Zarrin, Sarab, East Azerbaijan Province
- Sowmeeh-ye Bozorg, Razavi Khorasan Province
- Sowmeeh-ye Kuchak, Razavi Khorasan Province
- Sowmeeh, Mazul, Razavi Khorasan Province
- Sowmeeh, Rivand, Razavi Khorasan Province
- Sowmeeh, Torbat-e Heydarieh, Razavi Khorasan Province

== See also ==
- Sowme'eh Sara
- Sowme'eh Sara County
- Sowmeeh-ye Rudbar
