= Bayat =

Bayat may refer to:

== Places ==
=== Azerbaijan ===
- Boyat, Aghjabadi
- Boyat, Neftchala
- Boyat, Shamakhi
- Boyat, Ujar

=== Indonesia ===
- Bayat, Indonesia, a subdistrict in Klaten Regency, Central Java

=== Iran ===
- Bayat, East Azerbaijan
- Bayat-e Sofla, East Azerbaijan Province
- Bayat, Razavi Khorasan
- Bayat, West Azerbaijan
- Bayat Rural District, Markazi Province

=== Turkey ===
- Bayat, Afyonkarahisar
- Bayat, Çermik
- Bayat, Çivril
- Bayat, Çorum
- Bayat, Kargı
- Bayat, Kütahya
- Bayat, Merzifon

== Other uses ==
- Bayat (tribe), an Oghuz tribe in Turkmenistan, Iran, Turkey, Azerbaijan, Iraq, and Syria
- Bayat Power, an independent power producer in Afghanistan
- Bayat e Kurd, a musical mode in Iranian and Turkish classical musics
- Bayat e Turk, a musical mode in Iranian and Turkish classical musics

== See also ==
- Bayads, a Mongolian ethnic group
- Bay'ah, allegiance to a Muslim leader
- Bay'at al-Imam, an Islamic organisation in Jordan
- Bayati, a form of Azerbaijani folk poetry
- Bayati (maqam), a musical mode in Arabic, Turkish, and related systems of music
