= Bayat (tribe) =

Oghuz tribe

- Tamgha of Bayats, which represents the Eurasian eagle-owl according to Mahmud al-Kashgari. According to Abu al-Ghazi Bahadur, the Tamgha represents the snowy owl

Regions with significant populations
- Iran, Azerbaijan, Afghanistan, Iraq, Turkey, Turkmenistan, Syria

Languages
- Azerbaijani, Turkish, Turkmen and Persian

Religion
- Islam

Related ethnic groups
- Oghuz Turks

Bayat (Azerbaijani: Bayat tayfası; Persian: بیات; Turkish: Bayat boyu; Turkmen: Baýat taýpasy) is one of the Oghuz tribes in Turkmenistan, Iran, Turkey, Azerbaijan, Iraq, Afghanistan, and Syria. When Oghuz Turks started to migrate from the Aral steppes to Khorasan in the 11th and 13th centuries, Bayat people spread throughout the region. They are sub-ethnic groups of Turkmens and Azerbaijanis. The Bayats are Muslim and speak a southern dialect of Azerbaijani language in Azerbaijan and Iran, or their own dialect of Turkish in Turkey, and Ersari dialect of Turkmen in Turkmenistan and Uzbekistan. The ancient Turkmen proverb says: "Kayı and Bayat tribes shall lead the people" (Turkmen: "Il başy - gaýy-baýat").

== Etymology and origin ==
Initially, the ethnonym Bayat was mentioned as an Oguz tribe in the 11th century by the Turkic historian Mahmud Kashgari. Bayat - an Oghuz Turkic tribe, which stood together with the Kayi tribe at the head of all 24 Oguz tribes - "Il bashi Kayi-Bayat."

In the traditions of the Turkic tribes, the origin of this tribe is traced to Bayat - the grandson of Oghuz-Khan. In the book of the Khan and historian of the Khiva Khanate, Abu al-Ghazi Bahadur, "Genealogy of the Turkmens," the meaning of the name of the tribe is given as "rich". Bayat was the second son of Gun-Khan, who was the first son of Oguz-Khan. According to the work of the historian, Rashid-al-Din Fazl-Allah, "Oghuz-nameh", which is part of his extensive historical work Jami' al-tawarikh (Collection of Chronicles), the name Bayat means "rich, full of grace".

On the territory of Kievan Rus, Bayats are recorded as part of the Oghuz tribes in chronicles of the 10th-12th centuries by the name of bouts.

== Clans ==
Bayat is the name of an originally Turkic clan in Turkey, Azerbaijan and Iran which traces its origin to the 12th century. When Bayat clan started to migrate from the Aral steppes, their first destination was the city of Nishapur in the south of Khorasan, a state in the north-east of Iran. The Bayat clan moved in the 13th century to three different locations after attacks by Mongol forces.

From there, one group went east and north-east, so that the surname Bayat is still found in Afghanistan.

A second group went south-west towards Isfahan, and the surname Bayat is prominent in Arak, Hamedan, Malayer, Isfahan, Zanjan and Shiraz cities. The third group went north-west, and in Azerbaijan they divided in two; one part of the group took the west to Anatolia, and second part went south into Iraq, Syria and Lebanon.

== Bayat in Turkmenistan and Uzbekistan ==
Until 1928, the Gyzyletrek settlement of the Balkan velayat of Turkmenistan was called Bayathaji, while Bayat Turkmens still live in Darganata, Danew, Turkmenabat, Sayat, Farap and Hojambaz etraps (districts) of the Lebap velayat of Turkmenistan. Representatives of the Bayat tribe may also be found in many districts of Bukhara province of Uzbekistan, especially in Olat and Qarako'l.

== Places with name Bayat ==
Bayats are spread far into western Anatolia, their principal areas of settlement being in the provinces of Konya, Bursa, Afyon, Balıkesir and Kütahya. Today the name in forms such as Bayat, Bayatlar, Bayatlı is found in thirty-two mainly western Anatolian toponyms. The name also appears in toponyms in Iran, two near Arāk, one near Zanjan, one near Urmia, one in Khuzestan, one near Borūjerd, and one in Khorasan. In post-Soviet countries, five places in Azerbaijan, four in Turkmenistan, and one in Uzbekistan close to the Turkmenistan border bear the names Bayat. In Gujarat, India, one place can be found about 250 km away from the India-Pakistan border.

=== List of places bearing the name Bayat ===
==== Azerbaijan ====
- Boyat, Aghjabadi
- Boyat, Neftchala
- Boyat, Shamakhi
- Boyat, Ujar

==== Iran ====
- Bayat, East Azerbaijan
- Bayat-e Sofla, East Azerbaijan
- Bayat, Razavi Khorasan
- Bayat, West Azerbaijan
- Bayat Rural District, Markazi
- Qezel Tappeh-ye Bayat, Zanjan Province

==== Turkey ====
- Bayat, Afyonkarahisar Province
- Bayat, Çorum Province
- tr:Bayat, Amasya, Amasya Province
- tr:Bayat, Merzifon, Amasya Province
- tr:Bayat, Ayaş, Ankara Province
- tr:Bayat, Korkuteli, Antalya Province
- tr:Bayat, Altıeylül, Balikesir Province
- tr:Bayat, Gölpazarı, Bilecik Province
- tr:Bayat, Kargı, Çorum Province
- tr:Bayat, Çivril, Denizli Province
- tr:Bayat, Çermik, Diyarbakir Province
- Bayat, Atabey, Isparta Province
- tr:Bayat, Tosya, Kastamonu Province
- Bayat, Beyşehir, Konya Province
- Karabayat, Beyşehir Konya Province
- Bayat, Meram, Konya Province
- Bayat, Aslanapa, Kütahya Province
- tr:Bayat, Kütahya, Kütahya Province
- tr:Bayat, Gördes, Manisa Province
- tr:Bayat, Soma, Manisa Province
- Bayat, Bor, Nigde Province
- tr:Bayat, Geyve, Sakarya Province
- tr:Bayat, Durağan, Sinop Province
- Bayat, Sivas, Sivas Province
- tr:Bayat, Yıldızeli, Sivas Province
- tr:Bayat, Ereğli, Zonguldak Province
- tr:Şambayat, Besni, Adıyaman Province
- tr:Şambayadı, Çukurova, Adana Province
- tr:Yakabayat, Bolu, Bolu Province

== Notable figures ==
- Dede Korkut, legendary figure of the Oghuz
- Fuzûlî, Azerbaijani Diwan poet of Ottoman era
- Fath-Ali Shah Qajar, the second Shah (king) of Qajar Iran.
- Javad Khan, member of the Qajar dynasty, and the last khan of the Ganja Khanate from 1786 to 1804.

== People with the name Bayat ==
Bayat is a common surname today in Iran, Azerbaijan and to a lesser extent in Turkey, Afghanistan, and Turkmenistan where it carries the meaning "Knight" or "Chevalier". The Bayat surname can be found in the United Kingdom, India and South Africa.

Notable people with this name include:

- Abbas Bayat (born 1947), Iranian businessman
- Asef Bayat, Iranian professor of sociology
- Ehsan Bayat, Afghan-American entrepreneur, owner of Ariana Television Network and founder of the Bayat Foundation
- Morteza Gholi Bayat (1890–1958), former Prime Minister of Iran
- Shohreh Bayat (born 1988), Iranian chess referee
- Mohammed Mahdi al-Bayati (born 1962), Iraqi Turkmen politician
- Crystal Bayat, Afghan human rights activist known for her protests against the Taliban and advocacy for women's rights.

== See also ==
- Bayat Castle
