= Boyat =

Boyat or Bayat may refer to:

- Boyat, Aghjabadi, Azerbaijan
- Boyat, Neftchala, Azerbaijan
- Boyat, Shamakhi, Azerbaijan
- Boyat, Ujar, Azerbaijan

== See also ==
- Bayat (disambiguation)
