= Qeshlaq-e Barzeliq =

Village in East Azerbaijan province, Iran

Qeshlaq-e Barzeliq Persian: قشلاق برزليق
- Village
- Location within Iran
- Coordinates: 37°36′32″N 47°33′09″E
- Country: Iran
- Province: East Azerbaijan
- County: Torkamanchay
- District: Sowmaeh
- Rural District: Gavineh Rud

Population (2016)
  - Total: 128
- Time zone: UTC+3:30 (IRST)

Qeshlaq-e Barzeliq (Persian: قشلاق برزليق) (Note: Also romanized as Qeshlaq-e Barzaliq and Qeshlāq-e Barzalīq) is a village in Gavineh Rud Rural District of Sowmaeh District in Torkamanchay County, East Azerbaijan province, Iran.

== Demographics ==
=== Population ===
At the time of the 2006 National Census, the village's population was 262 in 58 households, when it was in Barvanan-e Sharqi Rural District of Torkamanchay District (Note: Renamed the Central District of Torkamanchay County) in Mianeh County. The following census in 2011 counted 198 people in 60 households. The 2016 census measured the population of the village as 128 people in 53 households.

In 2024, the district was separated from the county in the establishment of Torkamanchay County and renamed the Central District. Qeshlaq-e Barzeliq was transferred to Gavineh Rud Rural District created in the new Sowmaeh District.
