= Chopoqlu, Torkamanchay =

Village in East Azerbaijan province, Iran

Chopoqlu Persian: چپقلو
- Village
- Location within Iran
- Coordinates: 37°30′48″N 47°30′57″E
- Country: Iran
- Province: East Azerbaijan
- County: Torkamanchay
- District: Sowmaeh
- Rural District: Gavineh Rud

Population (2016)
  - Total: 68
- Time zone: UTC+3:30 (IRST)

Chopoqlu (Persian: چپقلو) (Note: Also romanized as Chapqolu and Chapqolū) is a village in Gavineh Rud Rural District of Sowmaeh District in Torkamanchay County, East Azerbaijan province, Iran.

== Demographics ==
=== Population ===
At the time of the 2006 National Census, the village's population was 79 in 20 households, when it was in Barvanan-e Sharqi Rural District of Torkamanchay District (Note: Renamed the Central District of Torkamanchay County) in Mianeh County. The following census in 2011 counted 20 people in seven households. The 2016 census measured the population of the village as 68 people in 24 households.

In 2024, the district was separated from the county in the establishment of Torkamanchay County and renamed the Central District. Chopoqlu was transferred to Gavineh Rud Rural District created in the new Sowmaeh District.
