= Helemsi =

Village in East Azerbaijan province, Iran

Helemsi Persian: حلمسي
- Village
- Location within Iran
- Coordinates: 37°40′15″N 47°31′03″E
- Country: Iran
- Province: East Azerbaijan
- County: Torkamanchay
- District: Sowmaeh
- Rural District: Gavineh Rud

Population (2016)
  - Total: 582
- Time zone: UTC+3:30 (IRST)

Helemsi (Persian: حلمسي) (Note: Also romanized as Ḩelemsī) is a village in Gavineh Rud Rural District of Sowmaeh District in Torkamanchay County, East Azerbaijan province, Iran.

== Demographics ==
=== Population ===
At the time of the 2006 National Census, the village's population was 766 in 187 households, when it was in Barvanan-e Sharqi Rural District of Torkamanchay District (Note: Renamed the Central District of Torkamanchay County) in Mianeh County. The following census in 2011 counted 706 people in 191 households. The 2016 census measured the population of the village as 582 people in 186 households.

In 2024, the district was separated from the county in the establishment of Torkamanchay County and renamed the Central District. Helemsi was transferred to Gavineh Rud Rural District created in the new Sowmaeh District.
