= Oshnar =

Village in East Azerbaijan province, Iran

Oshnar Persian: اشنار
- Village
- Location within Iran
- Coordinates: 37°36′43″N 47°30′29″E
- Country: Iran
- Province: East Azerbaijan
- County: Torkamanchay
- District: Sowmaeh
- Rural District: Gavineh Rud

Population (2016)
  - Total: 566
- Time zone: UTC+3:30 (IRST)

Oshnar (Persian: اشنار) (Note: Also romanized as Oshnār) is a village in Gavineh Rud Rural District of Sowmaeh District in Torkamanchay County, East Azerbaijan province, Iran.

== Demographics ==
=== Population ===
At the time of the 2006 National Census, the village's population was 558 in 103 households, when it was in Barvanan-e Sharqi Rural District of Torkamanchay District (Note: Renamed the Central District of Torkamanchay County) in Mianeh County. The following census in 2011 counted 558 people in 151 households. The 2016 census measured the population of the village as 566 people in 165 households.

In 2024, the district was separated from the county in the establishment of Torkamanchay County and renamed the Central District. Oshnar was transferred to Gavineh Rud Rural District created in the new Sowmaeh District.
