= Nowdiq =

Village in East Azerbaijan province, Iran

Nowdiq Persian: نوديق
- Village
- Location within Iran
- Coordinates: 37°34′38″N 47°30′28″E
- Country: Iran
- Province: East Azerbaijan
- County: Torkamanchay
- District: Sowmaeh
- Rural District: Gavineh Rud

Population (2016)
  - Total: 133
- Time zone: UTC+3:30 (IRST)

Nowdiq (Persian: نوديق) (Note: Also known as Nowdelaq (نودلق) and Nowdolag) is a village in Gavineh Rud Rural District of Sowmaeh District in Torkamanchay County, East Azerbaijan province, Iran.

== Demographics ==
=== Population ===
At the time of the 2006 National Census, the village's population was 198 in 54 households, when it was in Barvanan-e Sharqi Rural District of Torkamanchay District (Note: Renamed the Central District of Torkamanchay County) in Mianeh County. The following census in 2011 counted 138 people in 44 households. The 2016 census measured the population of the village as 133 people in 51 households.

In 2024, the district was separated from the county in the establishment of Torkamanchay County and renamed the Central District. Nowdiq was transferred to Gavineh Rud Rural District created in the new Sowmaeh District.
