= Gavineh Rud =

Village in East Azerbaijan province, Iran

Gavineh Rud Persian: گاوينه رود
- Village
- Location within Iran
- Coordinates: 37°34′01″N 47°32′55″E
- Country: Iran
- Province: East Azerbaijan
- County: Torkamanchay
- District: Sowmaeh
- Rural District: Gavineh Rud

Population (2016)
  - Total: 340
- Time zone: UTC+3:30 (IRST)

Gavineh Rud (Persian: گاوينه رود) (Note: Also romanized as Gāvīneh Rūd; also known as Kavan Rūd and Kāvīneh Rūd) is a village in, and the capital of, Gavineh Rud Rural District in Sowmaeh District of Torkamanchay County, East Azerbaijan province, Iran.

== Demographics ==
=== Population ===
At the time of the 2006 National Census, the village's population was 415 in 85 households, when it was in Barvanan-e Sharqi Rural District of Torkamanchay District (Note: Renamed the Central District of Torkamanchay County) in Mianeh County. The following census in 2011 counted 318 people in 76 households. The 2016 census measured the population of the village as 340 people in 110 households.

In 2024, the district was separated from the county in the establishment of Torkamanchay County and renamed the Central District. Gavineh Rud was transferred to Gavineh Rud Rural District created in the new Sowmaeh District.
