= Barzeliq =

Village in East Azerbaijan province, Iran

Barzeliq Persian: برزليق
- Village
- Location within Iran
- Coordinates: 37°37′31″N 47°32′46″E
- Country: Iran
- Province: East Azerbaijan
- County: Torkamanchay
- District: Sowmaeh
- Rural District: Gavineh Rud

Population (2016)
  - Total: 141
- Time zone: UTC+3:30 (IRST)

Barzeliq (Persian: برزليق) (Note: Also romanized as Barzelīq) is a village in Gavineh Rud Rural District of Sowmaeh District in Torkamanchay County, East Azerbaijan province, Iran.

== Demographics ==
=== Population ===
At the time of the 2006 National Census, the village's population was 245 in 64 households, when it was in Barvanan-e Sharqi Rural District of Torkamanchay District (Note: Renamed the Central District of Torkamanchay County) in Mianeh County. The following census in 2011 counted 160 people in 50 households. The 2016 census measured the population of the village as 141 people in 57 households.

In 2024, the district was separated from the county in the establishment of Torkamanchay County and renamed the Central District. Barzeliq was transferred to Gavineh Rud Rural District created in the new Sowmaeh District.
