= Qarah Tappeh, Torkamanchay =

Village in East Azerbaijan province, Iran

Qarah Tappeh Persian: قره‌تپه
- Village
- Location within Iran
- Coordinates: 37°30′57″N 47°27′46″E
- Country: Iran
- Province: East Azerbaijan
- County: Torkamanchay
- District: Sowmaeh
- Rural District: Gavineh Rud

Population (2016)
  - Total: 90
- Time zone: UTC+3:30 (IRST)

Qarah Tappeh (Persian: قره‌تپه) (Note: Also romanized as Qareh Tappeh; also known as Karatepeh, Qarā Tappeh, and Qara Tepe) is a village in Gavineh Rud Rural District of Sowmaeh District in Torkamanchay County, East Azerbaijan province, Iran.

== Demographics ==
=== Population ===
At the time of the 2006 National Census, the village's population was 122 in 35 households, when it was in Barvanan-e Sharqi Rural District of Torkamanchay District (Note: Renamed the Central District of Torkamanchay County) in Mianeh County. The following census in 2011 counted 108 people in 31 households. The 2016 census measured the population of the village as 90 people in 25 households.

In 2024, the district was separated from the county in the establishment of Torkamanchay County and renamed the Central District. Qarah Tappeh was transferred to Gavineh Rud Rural District created in the new Sowmaeh District.
