= Barvanan =

Barvanan (Persian: بروانان) may refer to the following places in Iran:

- Barvanan-e Gharbi Rural District
- Barvanan-e Markazi Rural District
- Barvanan-e Sharqi Rural District
