= Dastjerd, Torkamanchay =

Village in East Azerbaijan province, Iran

Dastjerd Persian: دستجرد
- Village
- Location within Iran
- Coordinates: 37°38′03″N 47°28′14″E
- Country: Iran
- Province: East Azerbaijan
- County: Torkamanchay
- District: Sowmaeh
- Rural District: Barvanan-e Sharqi

Population (2016)
  - Total: 393
- Time zone: UTC+3:30 (IRST)

Dastjerd (Persian: دستجرد) (Note: Also known as Dastjird) is a village in Barvanan-e Sharqi Rural District of Sowmaeh District in Torkamanchay County, East Azerbaijan province, Iran.

== Demographics ==
=== Population ===
At the time of the 2006 National Census, the village's population was 563 in 137 households, when it was in Torkamanchay District (Note: Renamed the Central District of Torkamanchay County) of Mianeh County. The following census in 2011 counted 438 people in 135 households. The 2016 census measured the population of the village as 393 people in 132 households.

In 2024, the district was separated from the county in the establishment of Torkamanchay County and renamed the Central District. The rural district was transferred to the new Sowmaeh District.
