= Chanaq Bolagh, East Azerbaijan =

Village in East Azerbaijan province, Iran

Chanaq Bolagh Persian: چناق بلاغ
- Village
- Location within Iran
- Coordinates: 37°33′27″N 47°27′55″E
- Country: Iran
- Province: East Azerbaijan
- County: Torkamanchay
- District: Sowmaeh
- Rural District: Gavineh Rud

Population (2016)
  - Total: 56
- Time zone: UTC+3:30 (IRST)

Chanaq Bolagh (Persian: چناق بلاغ) (Note: Also known as Chanaq Bulagh, also romanized as Chanāq Bulāgh) is a village in Gavineh Rud Rural District of Sowmaeh District in Torkamanchay County, East Azerbaijan province, Iran.

== Demographics ==
=== Population ===
At the time of the 2006 National Census, the village's population was 42 in 14 households, when it was in Barvanan-e Sharqi Rural District of Torkamanchay District (Note: Renamed the Central District of Torkamanchay County) in Mianeh County. The following census in 2011 counted 36 people in 13 households. The 2016 census measured the population of the village as 56 people in 21 households.

In 2024, the district was separated from the county in the establishment of Torkamanchay County and renamed the Central District. Chanaq Bolagh was transferred to Gavineh Rud Rural District created in the new Sowmaeh District.
