= Bolukan =

Village in East Azerbaijan province, Iran

Bolukan Persian: بلوكان
- Village
- Location within Iran
- Coordinates: 37°39′30″N 47°28′56″E
- Country: Iran
- Province: East Azerbaijan
- County: Torkamanchay
- District: Sowmaeh
- Rural District: Barvanan-e Sharqi

Population (2016)
  - Total: 372
- Time zone: UTC+3:30 (IRST)

Bolukan (Persian: بلوكان) (Note: Also romanized as Bolūkān; also known as Boledgān) is a village in Barvanan-e Sharqi Rural District of Sowmaeh District in Torkamanchay County, East Azerbaijan province, Iran.

== Demographics ==
=== Population ===
At the time of the 2006 National Census, the village's population was 537 in 117 households, when it was in Torkamanchay District (Note: Renamed the Central District of Torkamanchay County) of Mianeh County. The following census in 2011 counted 467 people in 128 households. The 2016 census measured the population of the village as 372 people in 129 households.

In 2024, the district was separated from the county in the establishment of Torkamanchay County and renamed the Central District. The rural district was transferred to the new Sowmaeh District.
