= Varnakesh =

Village in East Azerbaijan province, Iran

Varnakesh Persian: ورنكش
- Village
- Location within Iran
- Coordinates: 37°39′19″N 47°27′03″E
- Country: Iran
- Province: East Azerbaijan
- County: Torkamanchay
- District: Sowmaeh
- Rural District: Barvanan-e Sharqi

Population (2016)
  - Total: 916
- Time zone: UTC+3:30 (IRST)

Varnakesh (Persian: ورنكش) is a village in Barvanan-e Sharqi Rural District of Sowmaeh District in Torkamanchay County, East Azerbaijan province, Iran.

== Demographics ==
=== Population ===
At the time of the 2006 National Census, the village's population was 1,316 in 318 households, when it was in Torkamanchay District (Note: Renamed the Central District of Torkamanchay County) of Mianeh County. The following census in 2011 counted 966 people in 285 households. The 2016 census measured the population of the village as 916 people in 356 households.

In 2024, the district was separated from the county in the establishment of Torkamanchay County and renamed the Central District. The rural district was transferred to the new Sowmaeh District.
