= Sowmaeh-ye Bala =

Sowmaeh-ye Bala or Sowmeeh Bala (Persian: صومعه بالا) may refer to:

- Sowmaeh-ye Bala, East Azerbaijan
- Sowmaeh-ye Bala, Razavi Khorasan
