= Khvajeh Ghias =

Village in East Azerbaijan province, Iran

Khvajeh Ghias Persian: خواجه غياث Azerbaijani: Xocə-yəs (Xoca Qiyas)
- Village
- Location within Iran
- Coordinates: 37°33′10″N 47°25′44″E
- Country: Iran
- Province: East Azerbaijan
- County: Torkamanchay
- District: Central
- Rural District: Barvanan-e Markazi

Population (2016)
  - Total: 423
- Time zone: UTC+3:30 (IRST)

Khvajeh Ghias (Persian: خواجه غياث) (Note: Also romanized as Khvājeh Ghīās̄; Azerbaijani: Xocə-yəs (Xoca Qiyas)) is a village in, and the capital of, Barvanan-e Markazi Rural District in the Central District (Note: Formerly Torkamanchay District of Mianeh County) of Torkamanchay County, East Azerbaijan province, Iran. The rural district was previously administered from the city of Torkamanchay.

== Demographics ==
=== Population ===
At the time of the 2006 National Census, the village's population was 564 in 135 households, when it was in Torkamanchay District (Note: Renamed the Central District of Torkamanchay County) of Mianeh County. The following census in 2011 counted 410 people in 113 households. The 2016 census measured the population of the village as 423 people in 138 households.

In 2024, the district was separated from the county in the establishment of Torkamanchay County and renamed the Central District.
