= Qarehjah Qayah =

Iranian village in East Azerbaijan

Qarehjah Qayah قره جه قيه
- Village
- Location within Iran
- Coordinates: 37°35′50″N 47°17′48″E
- Country: Iran
- Province: East Azerbaijan
- County: Meyaneh
- Bakhsh: Torkamanchay
- Rural District: Barvanan-e Gharbi

Population (2006)
  - Total: 302
- Time zone: UTC+3:30 (IRST)
  - Summer (DST): UTC+4:30 (IRDT)

Qarehjah Qayah (Persian: قره جه قيه; also known as Qarājah Qayā) is a village in Barvanan-e Gharbi Rural District, Torkamanchay District, Meyaneh County, East Azerbaijan Province, Iran. At the 2006 census, its population was 302, in 63 families.
