= Kuhsalar =

Kuhsalar (Persian: كوهسالار) may refer to:

- Kuhsalar, Khoda Afarin
- Kuhsalar-e Olya, Meyaneh County
- Kuhsalar-e Sofla, Meyaneh County
