= Qabaq Tappeh, East Azerbaijan =

Village in East Azerbaijan province, Iran

Qabaq Tappeh Persian: قباق تپه
- Village
- Location within Iran
- Coordinates: 37°24′43″N 47°20′40″E
- Country: Iran
- Province: East Azerbaijan
- County: Torkamanchay
- District: Central
- Rural District: Owch Tappeh-ye Gharbi

Population (2016)
  - Total: 259
- Time zone: UTC+3:30 (IRST)

Qabaq Tappeh (Persian: قباق تپه) (Note: Also romanized as Qābāq Tappeh and Qabāq Tappeh) is a village in Owch Tappeh-ye Gharbi Rural District of the Central District (Note: Formerly Torkamanchay District of Mianeh County) in Torkamanchay County, East Azerbaijan province, Iran.

== Demographics ==
=== Population ===
At the time of the 2006 National Census, the village's population was 509 in 95 households, when it was in Torkamanchay District (Note: Renamed the Central District of Torkamanchay County) of Mianeh County. The following census in 2011 counted 257 people in 69 households. The 2016 census measured the population of the village as 259 people in 80 households.

In 2024, the district was separated from the county in the establishment of Torkamanchay County and renamed the Central District.
