= Kalhor, East Azerbaijan =

Village in East Azerbaijan province, Iran

Kalhor Persian: كلهر
- Village
- Location within Iran
- Coordinates: 37°41′16″N 47°21′05″E
- Country: Iran
- Province: East Azerbaijan
- County: Torkamanchay
- District: Central
- Rural District: Barvanan-e Gharbi

Population (2016)
  - Total: 779
- Time zone: UTC+3:30 (IRST)

Kalhor (Persian: كلهر) is a village in Barvanan-e Gharbi Rural District of the Central District (Note: Formerly Torkamanchay District of Mianeh County) in Torkamanchay County, East Azerbaijan province, Iran.

== Demographics ==
=== Population ===
At the time of the 2006 National Census, the village's population was 908 in 179 households, when it was in Torkamanchay District (Note: Renamed the Central District of Torkamanchay County) of Mianeh County. The following census in 2011 counted 769 people in 213 households. The 2016 census measured the population of the village as 779 people in 254 households. It was the most populous village in its rural district.

In 2024, the district was separated from the county in the establishment of Torkamanchay County and renamed the Central District.
