= Navliq =

Village in East Azerbaijan province, Iran

Navliq Persian: ناوليق
- Village
- Location within Iran
- Coordinates: 37°25′13″N 47°17′02″E
- Country: Iran
- Province: East Azerbaijan
- County: Torkamanchay
- District: Central
- Rural District: Owch Tappeh-ye Gharbi

Population (2016)
  - Total: 249
- Time zone: UTC+3:30 (IRST)

Navliq (Persian: ناوليق) (Note: Also romanized as Nāvlīq; also known as Navlūq) is a village in Owch Tappeh-ye Gharbi Rural District of the Central District (Note: Formerly Torkamanchay District of Mianeh County) in Torkamanchay County, East Azerbaijan province, Iran.

== Demographics ==
=== Population ===
At the time of the 2006 National Census, the village's population was 315 in 63 households, when it was in Torkamanchay District (Note: Renamed the Central District of Torkamanchay County) of Mianeh County. The following census in 2011 counted 258 people in 67 households. The 2016 census measured the population of the village as 249 people in 73 households.

In 2024, the district was separated from the county in the establishment of Torkamanchay County and renamed the Central District.
