= Sovinj =

Sovinj (Persian: سونج), also rendered as Sovich, may refer to:

- Sovinj-e Olya
- Sovinj-e Sofla
