= Mehmandust, East Azerbaijan =

Village in East Azerbaijan province, Iran

Mehmandust Persian: مهماندوست
- Village
- Location within Iran
- Coordinates: 37°37′42″N 47°19′18″E
- Country: Iran
- Province: East Azerbaijan
- County: Torkamanchay
- District: Central
- Rural District: Barvanan-e Gharbi

Population (2016)
  - Total: 290
- Time zone: UTC+3:30 (IRST)

Mehmandust (Persian: مهماندوست) (Note: Also romanized as Mehmāndūst) is a village in Barvanan-e Gharbi Rural District of the Central District (Note: Formerly Torkamanchay District of Mianeh County) in Torkamanchay County, East Azerbaijan province, Iran.

== Demographics ==
=== Population ===
At the time of the 2006 National Census, the village's population was 265 in 52 households, when it was in Torkamanchay District (Note: Renamed the Central District of Torkamanchay County) of Mianeh County. The following census in 2011 counted 265 people in 67 households. The 2016 census measured the population of the village as 290 people in 86 households.

In 2024, the district was separated from the county in the establishment of Torkamanchay County and renamed the Central District.
