= Gharib Dust =

Village in East Azerbaijan province, Iran

Gharib Dust Persian: غريب دوست
- Village
- Location within Iran
- Coordinates: 37°36′54″N 47°19′08″E
- Country: Iran
- Province: East Azerbaijan
- County: Torkamanchay
- District: Central
- Rural District: Barvanan-e Gharbi

Population (2016)
  - Total: 353
- Time zone: UTC+3:30 (IRST)

Gharib Dust (Persian: غريب دوست) (Note: Also romanized as Gharīb Dūst; also known as Qarīb Dūst) is a village in, and the capital of, Barvanan-e Gharbi Rural District in the Central District (Note: Formerly Torkamanchay District of Mianeh County) of Torkamanchay County, East Azerbaijan province, Iran.

== Demographics ==
=== Population ===
At the time of the 2006 National Census, the village's population was 381 in 89 households, when it was in Torkamanchay District (Note: Renamed the Central District of Torkamanchay County) of Mianeh County. The following census in 2011 counted 442 people in 124 households. The 2016 census measured the population of the village as 353 people in 113 households.

In 2024, the district was separated from the county in the establishment of Torkamanchay County and renamed the Central District.
