= Varzeqan, Torkamanchay =

Village in East Azerbaijan province, Iran

Varzeqan Persian: ورزقان
- Village
- Location within Iran
- Coordinates: 37°40′16″N 47°24′08″E
- Country: Iran
- Province: East Azerbaijan
- County: Torkamanchay
- District: Central
- Rural District: Barvanan-e Markazi

Population (2016)
  - Total: 1,015
- Time zone: UTC+3:30 (IRST)

Varzeqan (Persian: ورزقان) (Note: Also romanized as Varzaqān and Varzeqān) is a village in Barvanan-e Markazi Rural District of the Central District (Note: Formerly Torkamanchay District of Mianeh County) in Torkamanchay County, East Azerbaijan province, Iran.

== Demographics ==
=== Population ===
At the time of the 2006 National Census, the village's population was 1,180 in 254 households, when it was in Torkamanchay District (Note: Renamed the Central District of Torkamanchay County) of Mianeh County. The following census in 2011 counted 953 people in 268 households. The 2016 census measured the population of the village as 1,015 people in 352 households. It was the most populous village in its rural district.

In 2024, the district was separated from the county in the establishment of Torkamanchay County and renamed the Central District.
