= Bijerlu =

Bijerlu بيجرلو
- Village
- Location within Iran
- Coordinates: 37°33′32″N 47°14′34″E
- Country: Iran
- Province: East Azerbaijan
- County: Meyaneh
- Bakhsh: Torkamanchay
- Rural District: Barvanan-e Gharbi

Population (2006)
  - Total: 170
- Time zone: UTC+3:30 (IRST)
  - Summer (DST): UTC+4:30 (IRDT)

Bijerlu (Persian: بيجرلو, also Romanized as Bījerlū; also known as Bejerlū) is a village in Barvanan-e Gharbi Rural District, Torkamanchay District, Meyaneh County, East Azerbaijan Province, Iran. At the 2006 census, its population was 170, in 37 families.
