= Golujeh-ye Ghami =

Village in East Azerbaijan province, Iran

Golujeh-ye Ghami Persian: گلوجه غمي
- Village
- Location within Iran
- Coordinates: 37°25′34″N 47°22′53″E
- Country: Iran
- Province: East Azerbaijan
- County: Torkamanchay
- District: Central
- Rural District: Owch Tappeh-ye Gharbi

Population (2016)
  - Total: 62
- Time zone: UTC+3:30 (IRST)

Golujeh-ye Ghami (Persian: گلوجه غمي) (Note: Also romanized as Golūjeh-ye Ghamī; also known as Kolūjeh-ye Ghamī) is a village in Owch Tappeh-ye Gharbi Rural District of the Central District (Note: Formerly Torkamanchay District of Mianeh County) in Torkamanchay County, East Azerbaijan province, Iran.

== Demographics ==
=== Population ===
At the time of the 2006 National Census, the village's population was 37 in 16 households, when it was in Torkamanchay District (Note: Renamed the Central District of Torkamanchay County) of Mianeh County. The following census in 2011 counted 73 people in 27 households. The 2016 census measured the population of the village as 62 people in 21 households.

In 2024, the district was separated from the county in the establishment of Torkamanchay County and renamed the Central District.
