= Yalquz Aghaj, Torkamanchay =

Village in East Azerbaijan province, Iran

Yalquz Aghaj Persian: يالقوزاغاج
- Village
- Location within Iran
- Coordinates: 37°40′27″N 47°16′09″E
- Country: Iran
- Province: East Azerbaijan
- County: Torkamanchay
- District: Central
- Rural District: Barvanan-e Gharbi

Population (2016)
  - Total: 432
- Time zone: UTC+3:30 (IRST)

Yalquz Aghaj (Persian: يالقوزاغاج) (Note: Also romanized as Yālqūz Āghāj; also known as Bāltūz Āghāj, Lāl Kūzācāch, Lālqūzācāch, and Yālqūz Āqāj) is a village in Barvanan-e Gharbi Rural District of the Central District (Note: Formerly Torkamanchay District of Mianeh County) in Torkamanchay County, East Azerbaijan province, Iran.

== Demographics ==
=== Population ===
At the time of the 2006 National Census, the village's population was 255 in 79 households, when it was in Torkamanchay District (Note: Renamed the Central District of Torkamanchay County) of Mianeh County. The following census in 2011 counted 232 people in 79 households. The 2016 census measured the population of the village as 432 people in 159 households.

In 2024, the district was separated from the county in the establishment of Torkamanchay County and renamed the Central District.
