= Gug Daraq, East Azerbaijan =

Village in East Azerbaijan province, Iran

Gug Daraq Persian: گوگدرق
- Village
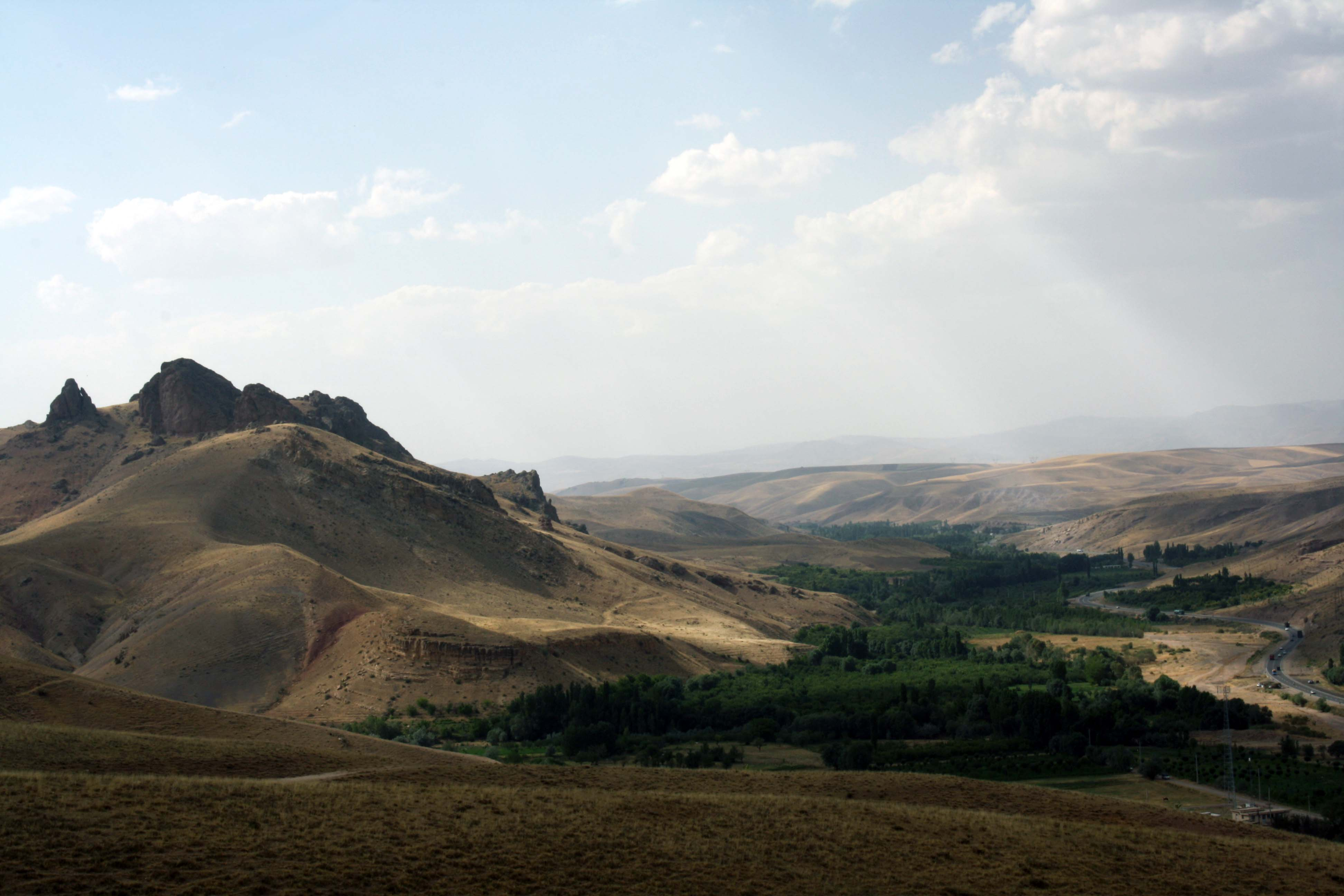
- Bal-e Qaya from the village of Gug Daraq

- Location within Iran
- Coordinates: 37°32′18″N 47°15′18″E
- Country: Iran
- Province: East Azerbaijan
- County: Torkamanchay
- District: Central
- Rural District: Barvanan-e Gharbi

Population (2016)
  - Total: 289
- Time zone: UTC+3:30 (IRST)

Gug Daraq (Persian: گوگدرق) (Note: Also romanized as Gūg Daraq and Gūgdarraq; also known as Gagdaraq, Gogdarag, Gorg Daraq, and Gūk Daraq) is a village in Barvanan-e Gharbi Rural District of the Central District (Note: Formerly Torkamanchay District of Mianeh County) in Torkamanchay County, East Azerbaijan province, Iran.

== Demographics ==
=== Population ===
At the time of the 2006 National Census, the village's population was 491 in 125 households, when it was in Torkamanchay District (Note: Renamed the Central District of Torkamanchay County) of Mianeh County. The following census in 2011 counted 417 people in 127 households. The 2016 census measured the population of the village as 289 people in 100 households.

In 2024, the district was separated from the county in the establishment of Torkamanchay County and renamed the Central District.
