= Qaleh Juq-e Najafqoli Khan =

Village in East Azerbaijan province, Iran

Qaleh Juq-e Najafqoli Khan Persian: قلعه جوق نجف قلي خان
- Village
- Location within Iran
- Coordinates: 37°22′45″N 47°22′18″E
- Country: Iran
- Province: East Azerbaijan
- County: Torkamanchay
- District: Central
- Rural District: Owch Tappeh-ye Gharbi

Population (2016)
  - Total: 447
- Time zone: UTC+3:30 (IRST)

Qaleh Juq-e Najafqoli Khan (Persian: قلعه جوق نجف قلي خان) (Note: Also romanized as Qal‘eh Jūq-e Najafqolī Khān; also known as Qal‘eh Jūq) is a village in Owch Tappeh-ye Gharbi Rural District of the Central District (Note: Formerly Torkamanchay District of Mianeh County) in Torkamanchay County, East Azerbaijan province, Iran.

== Demographics ==
=== Population ===
At the time of the 2006 National Census, the village's population was 626 in 105 households, when it was in Torkamanchay District (Note: Renamed the Central District of Torkamanchay County) of Mianeh County. The following census in 2011 counted 474 people in 114 households. The 2016 census measured the population of the village as 447 people in 135 households. It was the most populous village in its rural district.

In 2024, the district was separated from the county in the establishment of Torkamanchay County and renamed the Central District.
