= Khatunabad, Torkamanchay =

Village in East Azerbaijan province, Iran

Khatunabad Persian: خاتون اباد
- Village
- Location within Iran
- Coordinates: 37°25′35″N 47°18′40″E
- Country: Iran
- Province: East Azerbaijan
- County: Torkamanchay
- District: Central
- Rural District: Owch Tappeh-ye Gharbi

Population (2016)
  - Total: 282
- Time zone: UTC+3:30 (IRST)

Khatunabad (Persian: خاتون اباد) (Note: Also romanized as Khātūnābād) is a village in, and the capital of, Owch Tappeh-ye Gharbi Rural District in the Central District (Note: Formerly Torkamanchay District of Mianeh County) of Torkamanchay County, East Azerbaijan province, Iran.

== Demographics ==
=== Population ===
At the time of the 2006 National Census, the village's population was 397 in 78 households, when it was in Torkamanchay District (Note: Renamed the Central District of Torkamanchay County) of Mianeh County. The following census in 2011 counted 493 people in 139 households. The 2016 census measured the population of the village as 282 people in 87 households.

In 2024, the district was separated from the county in the establishment of Torkamanchay County and renamed the Central District.
