= Bolgheh Teymur =

Bolgheh Teymur بلغه تيمور
- Village
- Location within Iran
- Coordinates: 37°42′05″N 47°17′46″E
- Country: Iran
- Province: East Azerbaijan
- County: Meyaneh
- Bakhsh: Torkamanchay
- Rural District: Barvanan-e Gharbi

Population (2006)
  - Total: 226
- Time zone: UTC+3:30 (IRST)
  - Summer (DST): UTC+4:30 (IRDT)

Bolfeh Teymur (Persian: بلفه تيمور; also known as Bilatamir, Bolfah Teymūr and Bolfeh Taymūr) is a village in Barvanan-e Gharbi Rural District, Torkamanchay District, Meyaneh County, East Azerbaijan province, Iran. At the 2006 census, its population was 226, in 55 families.

Bolgheh Teumyur is completely wrong name. The true name of this place is Bolfeh Teymur as mentioned in Dehkhoda dictionary.
