= Sanyan-e Sofla =

Village in East Azerbaijan province, Iran

Sanyan-e Sofla Persian: سانيان سفلي
- Village
- Location within Iran
- Coordinates: 37°37′52″N 47°18′03″E
- Country: Iran
- Province: East Azerbaijan
- County: Torkamanchay
- District: Central
- Rural District: Barvanan-e Gharbi

Population (2016)
  - Total: 263
- Time zone: UTC+3:30 (IRST)

Sanyan-e Sofla (Persian: سانيان سفلي) (Note: Also romanized as Sānyān-e Soflá; also known as Sānyān-e Pā'īn) is a village in Barvanan-e Gharbi Rural District of the Central District (Note: Formerly Torkamanchay District of Mianeh County) in Torkamanchay County, East Azerbaijan province, Iran.

== Demographics ==
=== Population ===
At the time of the 2006 National Census, the village's population was 494 in 100 households, when it was in Torkamanchay District (Note: Renamed the Central District of Torkamanchay County) of Mianeh County. The following census in 2011 counted 304 people in 79 households. The 2016 census measured the population of the village as 263 people in 86 households.

In 2024, the district was separated from the county in the establishment of Torkamanchay County and renamed the Central District.
