= Seyyedlar, Torkamanchay =

Village in East Azerbaijan province, Iran

Seyyedlar Persian: سيدلر
- Village
- Location within Iran
- Coordinates: 37°29′16″N 47°24′13″E
- Country: Iran
- Province: East Azerbaijan
- County: Torkamanchay
- District: Central
- Rural District: Owch Tappeh-ye Gharbi

Population (2016)
  - Total: 12
- Time zone: UTC+3:30 (IRST)

Seyyedlar (Persian: سيدلر) is a village in Owch Tappeh-ye Gharbi Rural District of the Central District (Note: Formerly Torkamanchay District of Mianeh County) in Torkamanchay County, East Azerbaijan province, Iran.

== Demographics ==
=== Population ===
At the time of the 2006 National Census, the village's population was 18 in 12 households, when it was in Torkamanchay District (Note: Renamed the Central District of Torkamanchay County) of Mianeh County. The population was below the reporting threshold at the following census in 2011. The 2016 census measured the population of the village as 12 people in six households.

In 2024, the district was separated from the county in the establishment of Torkamanchay County and renamed the Central District.
