= Sowmaeh-ye Sofla, Torkamanchay =

Village in East Azerbaijan province, Iran

Sowmaeh-ye Sofla Persian: صومعه سفلي
- Village
- Location within Iran
- Coordinates: 37°32′59″N 47°29′14″E
- Country: Iran
- Province: East Azerbaijan
- County: Torkamanchay
- District: Sowmaeh
- Rural District: Gavineh Rud

Population (2016)
  - Total: 139
- Time zone: UTC+3:30 (IRST)

Sowmaeh-ye Sofla (Persian: صومعه سفلي) (Note: Also romanized as Sowma‘eh-ye Soflá; also known as Şowma‘eh, Şowma‘eh-ye Pā’īn, and Sowme‘eh-ye Pā’īn) is a village in Gavineh Rud Rural District of Sowmaeh District in Torkamanchay County, East Azerbaijan province, Iran.

== Demographics ==
=== Population ===
At the time of the 2006 National Census, the village's population was 186 in 45 households, when it was in Barvanan-e Sharqi Rural District of Torkamanchay District (Note: Renamed the Central District of Torkamanchay County) in Mianeh County. The following census in 2011 counted 164 people in 45 households. The 2016 census measured the population of the village as 139 people in 48 households.

In 2024, the district was separated from the county in the establishment of Torkamanchay County and renamed the Central District. Sowmaeh-ye Sofla was transferred to Gavineh Rud Rural District created in the new Sowmaeh District.
