= Kesajin =

Village in East Azerbaijan province, Iran

Kesajin Persian: كسجين
- Village
- Location within Iran
- Coordinates: 37°22′11″N 47°18′26″E
- Country: Iran
- Province: East Azerbaijan
- County: Torkamanchay
- District: Central
- Rural District: Owch Tappeh-ye Gharbi

Population (2016)
  - Total: 144
- Time zone: UTC+3:30 (IRST)

Kesajin (Persian: كسجين) (Note: Also romanized as Kesajīn) is a village in Owch Tappeh-ye Gharbi Rural District of the Central District (Note: Formerly Torkamanchay District of Mianeh County) in Torkamanchay County, East Azerbaijan province, Iran.

== Demographics ==
=== Population ===
At the time of the 2006 National Census, the village's population was 221 in 44 households, when it was in Torkamanchay District (Note: Renamed the Central District of Torkamanchay County) of Mianeh County. The following census in 2011 counted 172 people in 37 households. The 2016 census measured the population of the village as 144 people in 39 households.

In 2024, the district was separated from the county in the establishment of Torkamanchay County and renamed the Central District.
