= Sowmaeh-ye Pain =

Sowmaeh-ye Pain or Sowmeeh-ye Pain (Persian: صومعه پائین) may refer to:

- Sowmaeh-ye Pain, East Azerbaijan
- Sowmaeh-ye Pain, Razavi Khorasan
