= Yengejeh, Torkamanchay =

Village in East Azerbaijan province, Iran

Yengejeh Persian: ينگجه
- Village
- Location within Iran
- Coordinates: 37°41′25″N 47°19′04″E
- Country: Iran
- Province: East Azerbaijan
- County: Torkamanchay
- District: Central
- Rural District: Barvanan-e Gharbi

Population (2016)
  - Total: 208
- Time zone: UTC+3:30 (IRST)

Yengejeh (Persian: ينگجه) (Note: Also romanized as Yengejah) is a village in Barvanan-e Gharbi Rural District of the Central District (Note: Formerly Torkamanchay District of Mianeh County) in Torkamanchay County, East Azerbaijan province, Iran.

== Demographics ==
=== Population ===
At the time of the 2006 National Census, the village's population was 334 in 73 households, when it was in Torkamanchay District (Note: Renamed the Central District of Torkamanchay County) of Mianeh County. The following census in 2011 counted 225 people in 71 households. The 2016 census measured the population of the village as 208 people in 85 households.

In 2024, the district was separated from the county in the establishment of Torkamanchay County and renamed the Central District.
