= Dördlər =

Dördlər or Dörtlər or Dortlyar may refer to:

- Dördlər, Fuzuli, Azerbaijan
- Dördlər, Gadabay, Azerbaijan
- Dördlər, Neftchala (disambiguation), Azerbaijan
- Dörtler, Erzincan, Turkey
