= Owranjaq =

Village in East Azerbaijan province, Iran

Owranjaq Persian: اورنجق
- Village
- Location within Iran
- Coordinates: 37°32′53″N 47°23′45″E
- Country: Iran
- Province: East Azerbaijan
- County: Torkamanchay
- District: Central
- Rural District: Barvanan-e Markazi

Population (2016)
  - Total: 0
- Time zone: UTC+3:30 (IRST)

Owranjaq (Persian: اورنجق) (Note: Also romanized as Ūranjaq) is a village in Barvanan-e Markazi Rural District of the Central District (Note: Formerly Torkamanchay District of Mianeh County) in Torkamanchay County, East Azerbaijan province, Iran.

== Demographics ==
=== Population ===
At the time of the 2006 National Census, the village's population was 68 in 15 households, when it was in Torkamanchay District (Note: Renamed the Central District of Torkamanchay County) of Mianeh County. The following census in 2011 counted a population below the reporting threshold. The 2016 census measured the population of the village as zero.

In 2024, the district was separated from the county in the establishment of Torkamanchay County and renamed the Central District.
