= Barjvan =

Barjvan برجوان
- Village
- Location within Iran
- Coordinates: 37°35′28″N 47°14′19″E
- Country: Iran
- Province: East Azerbaijan
- County: Meyaneh
- Bakhsh: Torkamanchay
- Rural District: Barvanan-e Gharbi

Population (2006)
  - Total: 64
- Time zone: UTC+3:30 (IRST)
  - Summer (DST): UTC+4:30 (IRDT)

Barjvan (Persian: برجوان, also Romanized as Barjvān; also known as Bajvān) is a village in Barvanan-e Gharbi Rural District, Torkamanchay District, Meyaneh County, East Azerbaijan Province, Iran. At the 2006 census, its population was 64, in 12 families.
