= Chenaq Bolagh =

Chenaq Bolagh or Chanaq Bolagh (Persian: چناقبلاغ or چناق بلاغ) may refer to:

- Chenaq Bolagh, Ardabil
- Chanaq Bolagh, East Azerbaijan
- Chenaq Bolagh, Zanjan
