= Kuhsalar-e Sofla =

Village in East Azerbaijan province, Iran

Kuhsalar-e Sofla Persian: كوهسالارسفلي
- Village
- Location within Iran
- Coordinates: 37°31′32″N 47°21′03″E
- Country: Iran
- Province: East Azerbaijan
- County: Torkamanchay
- District: Central
- Rural District: Barvanan-e Markazi

Population (2016)
  - Total: 92
- Time zone: UTC+3:30 (IRST)

Kuhsalar-e Sofla (Persian: كوهسالارسفلي) (Note: Also romanized as Kūhsālār-e Soflá; also known as Kūsālār-e Soflá (کوسالارسفل) and Kūsālār-e Pā'īn) is a village in Barvanan-e Markazi Rural District of the Central District (Note: Formerly Torkamanchay District of Mianeh County) in Torkamanchay County, East Azerbaijan province, Iran.

== Demographics ==
=== Population ===
At the time of the 2006 National Census, the village's population was 108 in 23 households, when it was in Torkamanchay District (Note: Renamed the Central District of Torkamanchay County) of Mianeh County. The following census in 2011 counted 88 people in 22 households. The 2016 census measured the population of the village as 92 people in 35 households.

In 2024, the district was separated from the county in the establishment of Torkamanchay County and renamed the Central District.
