= Sovinj-e Olya =

Sovinj-e Olya سونج عليا
- Village
- Location within Iran
- Coordinates: 37°32′05″N 47°17′17″E
- Country: Iran
- Province: East Azerbaijan
- County: Meyaneh
- Bakhsh: Torkamanchay
- Rural District: Barvanan-e Gharbi

Population (2006)
  - Total: 40
- Time zone: UTC+3:30 (IRST)
  - Summer (DST): UTC+4:30 (IRDT)

Sovinj-e Olya (Persian: سونج عليا, also Romanized as Sovīnj-e ‘Olyā; also known as Sovīch-e Bālā) is a village in Barvanan-e Gharbi Rural District, Torkamanchay District, Meyaneh County, East Azerbaijan Province, Iran. At the 2006 census, its population was 40, in 9 families.
