= Eyyub Bashirov =

Azerbaijani biologist-scientist, academician

Eyyub Bashirov Eyyub Bəşirov
- Born: Eyyub Balaməmməd oğlu Bəşirov; December 12, 1925; Xol Qarabucaq, Salyan, Azerbaijan SSR, Transcaucasian SFSR, USSR
- Died: November 7, 2017 (aged 91)
- Citizenship: USSR; Azerbaijan
- Scientific career
- Fields: Animal husbandry

Eyyub Balamammad oglu Bashirov (Azerbaijani: Eyyub Balaməmməd oğlu Bəşirov; December 12, 1925 – November 7, 2017) was an Azerbaijani biologist-scientist, academician, president of Association of Animal husbandry of Azerbaijan, real member of the Russian Academy of International Quality Problems and member of the board of the Council of Elders of Azerbaijan Republic.

== Biography ==
Eyyub Bashirov was born on December 12, 1925, in Xol Qarabucaq village of Salyan (now Neftchala District). He graduated from Salyan Pedagogical Technical School in 1943 with distinctive marks and began his teaching career. Eyyub Bashirov, admitted to the Zootechnic Faculty of the Azerbaijan Agricultural Institute in 1945, was transferred to the third course of the Zootechnical faculty of the Moscow State Agricultural Academy named after Kliment A. Timiryazev two years later as a distinguished student. After graduating from the academy, Eyyub returned to Azerbaijan and served in the development of animal husbandry, agrarian science and folk medicine. In 1953, he graduated from the All-Union Institute of Animal Husbandry and received his scientific degree of candidate of sciences in 1954.

Eyyub Bashirov began scientific activity in mid-20th century - in 1947. In 1947–1954, he prepared works in the Moscow State Agricultural Academy and carried out scientific researches.

Bashirov has served in different periods in India, Algeria, Chile, and Afghanistan, in organization, development and strengthening of the agricultural sector, the breeding and fertilization system of these countries. In 1971, during his scientific mission to Chile, Eyyub Bashirov developed a 10-year plan-program for the solution of many scientific problems such as animal breeding development, progressive methods and technologies.

== Works ==
Eyyub Bashirov is the author of more than 700 published scientific and publicistic articles, 2 textbooks, 3 monographs, 4 instructions. Among his works are:

- "Animal husbandry of Algeria";
- "Animal husbandry of Chile";
- "Afghanistan's Livestock Farming";
- "Scientific basis of problems and development of pedigree cattle breeding in Azerbaijan".

== Awards ==
In September 1964, Eyyub Bashirov made a scientific report at the scientific conference held in Trento, Italy. His scientific report was awarded the first place and a gold medal at the V International Congress of Biologists. Pope Paul VI congratulated the sciencist for the success and presented his portrait to him. Ayyub Bashirov was also awarded with the order of the Badge of Honour.

== Family ==
Eyyub Bashirov was of Shamakhi origin. After the earthquake that took place on May 31, 1859, their families moved to the village of Xol Qarabucaq in Salyan. His great-grandfather, Hadji Samed was the veteran of the city during the earthquake.

Eyyub Bashirov married his childhood sweetheart Saadet Bashirova in 1955. He was a father of three sons. His elder son, Yashar is the President of the National Karate Federation of Azerbaijan, World and European champion, Honorable Sports Master. Yashar is also a candidate of biological sciences. Khanlar is a well-known dancer of the Azerbaijan Republic and Honored Artist of Azerbaijan. His last son, Khagani is a businessman.
