= Dördlər, Neftchala =

Dördlər, Neftchala may refer to:

- Dördlər, Boyat, Azerbaijan
- Dördlər, Xol Qarabucaq, Azerbaijan
