= Sovinj-e Sofla =

Sovinj-e Sofla سونج سفلي
- Village
- Location within Iran
- Coordinates: 37°32′02″N 47°18′22″E
- Country: Iran
- Province: East Azerbaijan
- County: Meyaneh
- Bakhsh: Torkamanchay
- Rural District: Barvanan-e Gharbi

Population (2006)
  - Total: 331
- Time zone: UTC+3:30 (IRST)
  - Summer (DST): UTC+4:30 (IRDT)

Sovinj-e Sofla (Persian: سونج سفلي, also Romanized as Sovīnj-e Soflá; also known as Sovīch-e Pā'īn) is a village in Barvanan-e Gharbi Rural District, Torkamanchay District, Meyaneh County, East Azerbaijan Province, Iran. At the 2006 census, its population was 331, in 72 families.
