= Kuhsalar-e Olya =

Village in East Azerbaijan province, Iran

Kuhsalar-e Olya Persian: كوهسالارعليا
- Village
- Location within Iran
- Coordinates: 37°31′52″N 47°20′28″E
- Country: Iran
- Province: East Azerbaijan
- County: Torkamanchay
- District: Central
- Rural District: Barvanan-e Markazi

Population (2016)
  - Total: 191
- Time zone: UTC+3:30 (IRST)

Kuhsalar-e Olya (Persian: كوهسالارعليا) (Note: Also romanized as Kūhsālār-e ‘Olyā; also known as Kūsālār-e ‘Olyā (کوسالارعليا) and Kūsālār-e Bālā) is a village in Barvanan-e Markazi Rural District of the Central District (Note: Formerly Torkamanchay District of Mianeh County) in Torkamanchay County, East Azerbaijan province, Iran.

== Demographics ==
=== Population ===
At the time of the 2006 National Census, the village's population was 254 in 63 households, when it was in Torkamanchay District (Note: Renamed the Central District of Torkamanchay County) of Mianeh County. The following census in 2011 counted 145 people in 41 households. The 2016 census measured the population of the village as 191 people in 70 households.

In 2024, the district was separated from the county in the establishment of Torkamanchay County and renamed the Central District.
