= Sowmaeh Zarrin =

Sowmaeh Zarrin (Persian: صومعه زرين) may refer to:

- Sowmaeh Zarrin, Sarab
- Sowmaeh Zarrin, Mehraban, Sarab County
