= Gavineh Rud Rural District =

Rural district in East Azerbaijan province, Iran

Gavineh Rud Rural District Persian: دهستان گاوینه‌رود
- Rural District
- Location within Iran
- Coordinates: 37°34′N 47°33′E
- Country: Iran
- Province: East Azerbaijan
- County: Torkamanchay
- District: Sowmaeh
- Established: 2024
- Capital: Gavineh Rud
- Time zone: UTC+3:30 (IRST)

Gavineh Rud Rural District (Persian: دهستان گاوینه‌رود) is in Sowmaeh District of Torkamanchay County, East Azerbaijan province, Iran. Its capital is the village of Gavineh Rud, whose population at the time of the 2016 National Census was 340 people in 110 households.

== History ==
In 2024, Torkamanchay District (Note: Renamed the Central District of Torkamanchay County) was separated from Mianeh County in the establishment of Torkamanchay County and renamed the Central District. Gavineh Rud Rural District was created in the new Sowmaeh District.

== Other villages in the rural district ==
- Barzeliq
- Chanaq Bolagh
- Chopoqlu
- Helemsi
- Nowdiq
- Oshnar
- Qarah Tappeh
- Qeshlaq-e Barzeliq
- Sowmaeh-ye Sofla
