= Neftçala =

- City and Municipality
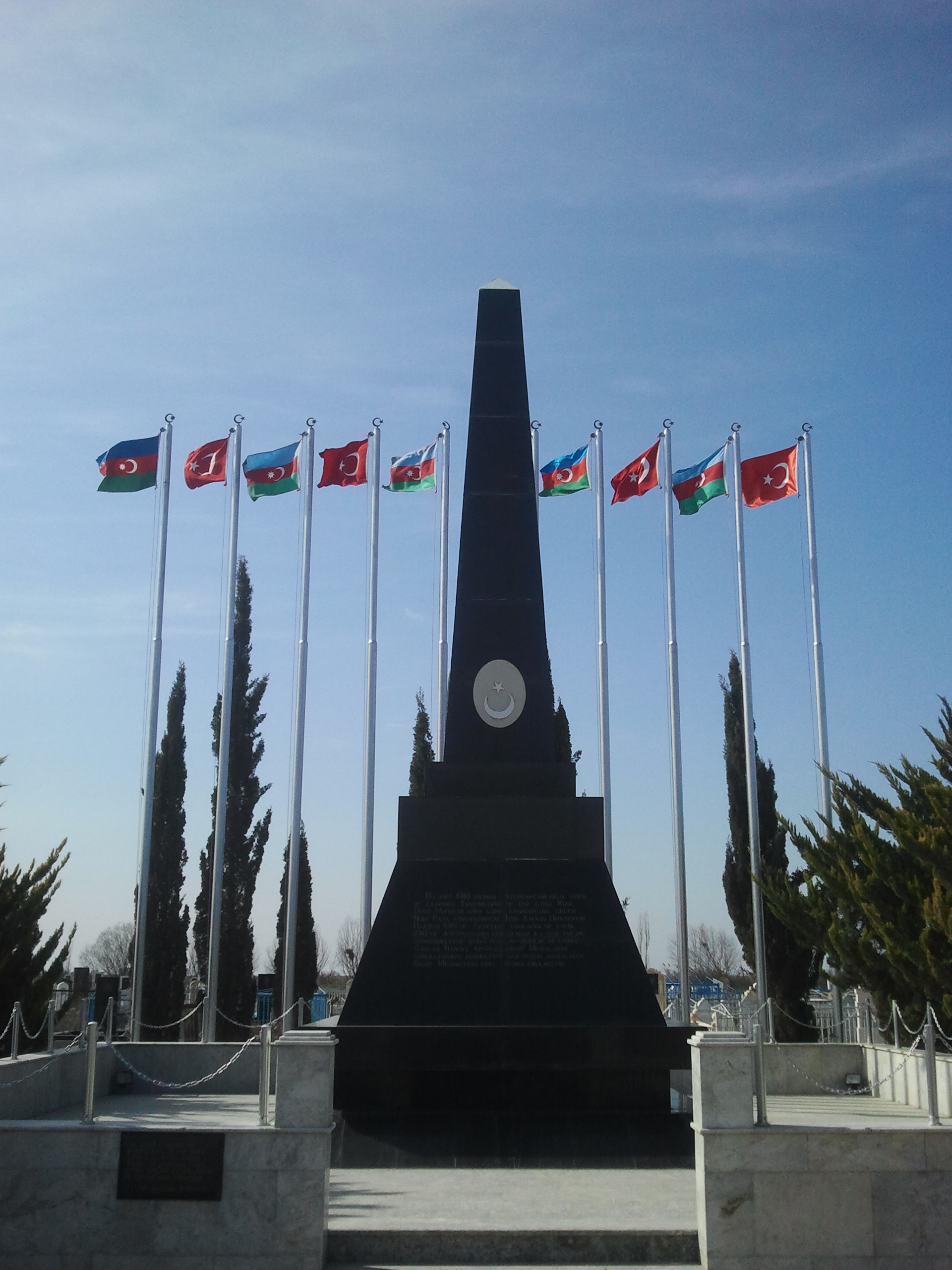
- Monument to Turkish martyrs

- Location within Azerbaijan
- Coordinates: 39°21′31″N 49°14′49″E
- Country: Azerbaijan
- District: Neftchala
- Established: 1959
- Elevation: −26 m (−85 ft)

Population (2010)
  - Total: 20,510
- Time zone: UTC+4 (AZT)
- Area code: +994 153
- Website: neftchala-ih.gov.az

Neftchala (Azerbaijani: Neftçala) is a city and the capital of the Neftchala District of Azerbaijan.

== Etymology ==
The origin of the city name is Persian ('naft' meaning oil or petroleum) and Azerbaijani ('çala' meaning trench), meaning oil trench.

== History ==
Throughout its history, Neftçala has suffered from floods because of its proximity to the river and most of the town's relatively low elevation.

Today, there is a palace of culture, a regional study museum and gallery museum in the city.

== Geography and demographics ==
The city lies southwest of the delta of the Kura River. It is a lowland district. The population in 2010 was 20,510.

== Economy ==
People are mainly employed in manufacturing, fish industry, transportation and service sectors. The largest employer operating in Neftçala is the Neftçala Industrial Park which includes Khazar Automobile Plant by AzerMash.

== Sports ==
The city has one professional football team, Neftchala, which has competed in the second-flight of Azerbaijani football, the Azerbaijan First Division, but the team is eliminated after 2 years of championship in the Azerbaijan First Division and not getting the license for competing in the Azerbaijan Premier League.

== Transport ==
Neftchala has a large urban transport system, mostly managed by the Ministry of Transportation.

== Notable residents ==
Some of the city's many prestigious residents include: singer Anatollu Ganiyev and World War II hero Aghashirin Jafarov.
