= Xoltəzəkənd =

- Location within Azerbaijan
- Coordinates: 39°17′N 48°52′E
- Country: Azerbaijan
- Rayon: Neftchala
- Municipality: Xol Qarabucaq
- Time zone: UTC+4 (AZT)
  - Summer (DST): UTC+5 (AZT)

Xoltəzəkənd (also, Kholtazakend) is a village in the Neftchala Rayon of Azerbaijan. The village forms part of the municipality of Xol Qarabucaq.
