= Crystal Bayat =

Afghan social activist and human rights advocate (born 1997)

- کریستال بیات
- Crystal Bayat, currently living in the U.S. and finishing her master's degree at Carnegie Mellon University
- Born: 16 January 1997 (age 29); Kabul, Afghanistan
- Education: Delhi University
- Occupations: Social activist and humanitarian for Afghan women, education and minorities and champion for equal justice for all Afghan citizens.

Crystal Bayat (Dari: کریستال بیات; born 1997) is an Afghan human rights advocate known for her work on women's rights, ethnic equality, civic tech, campaign for the recognition of ethnic minority socioeconomic rights and their ethnic name on national identity card. During the period of the former Afghan government, she represented ethnic and religious minorities in peace negotiations held in Doha, Qatar.

Bayat gained international attention in August 2021 after helping organize and lead street protests for women's rights and freedom in Kabul following the Taliban's return to power. Images of her confronting an armed Taliban fighter during the demonstrations circulated internationally. Later that year, she was named to the BBC's 100 Women list.

After leaving Afghanistan, Bayat resettled in the United States, where she continued her advocacy. In 2023, she received the Utah Attorney General's Warrior Award and was also named activist of the year by the Utah House of Representatives. Bayat leads Hope for Her International, a nonprofit originally established in 2022 as the Crystal Bayat Foundation, which works in Utah-based refugee education and training, women's entrepreneurship, STEM education, refugee resettlement and emergency assistance including healthcare and living subsidies.

== Early life ==
Bayat was born in 1997 in Kabul and is a native of Ghazni Province, and a member of the Bayat tribe, a Turkic ethnic minority. Her mother was a gynaecologist, and her father worked for the Ministry of Interior Affairs before the collapse of the republic.

Bayat completed her high-school from Rabia-e-Balkhi high school in Kabul Afghanistan. She ranked fifth among roughly 300,000 students on the Kankor, Afghanistan's national university entrance examination, she first studied law and political science at Kabul University but left after facing harassment there and moved to India on a scholarship to study political science with minor in economic at Daulat Ram College, University of Delhi, graduating in 2019. She went on to complete a master's degree in comparative politics and international studies at Payam-e-Noor University, after moving to the United States, she began a second master's degree, in public policy and management, at Carnegie Mellon University's Heinz College on a Fulbright Scholarship.

== Activism against the Taliban ==
After returning from school in India to Afghanistan in 2019, Bayat started the civil rights political think tank, Justice and Equality Trend, and the Crystal Bayat Foundation, a humanitarian nonprofit focused on protecting women's rights.

In line with her socio-political activism, Bayat launched the campaign for the ethnic minority "Bayat is Our Identity and Our Identity is Our Pride." After writing a letter to former Afghan President Mohammad Ashraf Ghani, she succeeded in inserting the minority ethnic name into national ID cards, which was a major countrywide achievement for Bayat. She was also the representative of minorities at peace negotiations in Doha, Qatar, between the Taliban and the former government. She was the member of Loy Jirga, the traditional grand assembly of Afghanistan. Bayat survived an assassination attempt by the Taliban in 2020 due to her active role in peace negotiations. She has published several articles in national and international media (in Persian and English) on women's rights during the peace talks with the Taliban. Some of her earlier campaigns in Afghanistan included efforts to have ethnic minority names recognized on national identity cards and to challenge menstruation taboos.

Following the Taliban's takeover of Kabul in August 2021, she helped organize and lead street protests marking Afghanistan's Independence Day, where she was photographed being confronted by an armed Taliban fighter and was quoted declaring, "Our flag is our identity." She was one of the very first women who stood up for women rights after the Taliban takeover, among about 200 protesters. Her role in the protests was covered by international outlets including the New York Times, BBC News, Washington Post, ABC and multiple Indian news organizations that had followed her as a Delhi University graduate.

Bayat continues to speak to the media and at public and private events about the current geopolitical situation in Afghanistan. She is also active in helping friends, family and academic and professional colleagues achieve a collective voice against today's inhumane treatment and poor governance by the Taliban.

== Resettlement in the United States and continued advocacy ==
Bayat was resettled as a refugee in the United States with assistance connected to Utah, where she has continued her advocacy work. On February 15, 2023, Utah Attorney General Sean Reyes presented her with the state's Warrior Award, recognizing her human rights work and advocacy for Afghan women and children. Accepting the award, Bayat said, "This recognition is not only for me; this is recognizing those voices that are unable to be heard," and noted the length of time Afghan girls had been barred from school. In 2023 she was named a visiting fellow of the Independent Women's Forum. She has also received recognition through the Utah Council for Citizen Diplomacy's "7 for 17" awards program, which honors work connected to United Nations Sustainable Development Goals. In June 2023, Bayat wrote an opinion piece for Deseret News, "The Taliban took everything from me. Now many lives are in legal limbo," on the legal situation of Afghan refugees.

== Hope for Her International ==
In March 2024, the Crystal Bayat Foundation, which Bayat had run since 2022, rebranded as Hope for Her International, with Bayat continuing as its founder and director. The nonprofit, based in Salt Lake City, Utah, organizes its program work across four areas: entrepreneurship and mentorship for women, an education initiative called Education for Everyone, evacuation and risk mitigation support for people in danger, and health programs addressing mental health and maternal and child health. In 2026, the organization launched Drive to Thrive, a pilot program that pays for refugee women to obtain driver's licenses and aims to provide them with cars, on the reasoning that the ability to drive is central to economic independence for resettled refugees.

== Education ==
After high school graduation, Bayat received a fifth ranking on the Kankor examination out of three hundred thousand students across Afghanistan.

After acceptance to Kabul University's Faculty of Law program, Bayat was awarded a scholarship from the Indian Council for Cultural Relations. She went to join Daulat Ram College in Delhi, and graduated with a bachelor's degree in political science in 2019 in the first ranking. She holds a master's degree from the United Nations Institute in Delhi. In 2021, Bayat began her PhD in Political Management at Delhi University; however, her program was cut short due to the Taliban takeover.

Bayat was accepted into the Heinz College Masters of Public Policy program of Carnegie Mellon University in Pittsburgh, Pennsylvania.

== Awards and recognitions ==
In 2020, Bayat received the Rumi Award (2nd place) in the "Literature Category" and was also named as one of 50 Influential Women by Rumi Award organizers. She was also recognized by the former Afghan president and parliament in early 2020 for activism in passing the minority rights bill.

On 7 December 2021, Crystal Bayat was named in the BBC 100 Women 2021 list for her social activist and human rights advocacy, which figured prominently in protests against the Taliban takeover in 2021.

Additional awards include: RUMI Award (second place, literature category) in 2020, Warrior Award (Utah Attorney General's Office) in 2023, Activist of the Year (Utah House of Representatives) in 2023, and the 7 for 17 Recognition (Utah Council for Citizen Diplomacy) in 2024.
