= Aghashirin Jafarov =

Soviet Azerbaijani army starshina (1906–1984)

Agashirin Agamamed oglu Jafarov
- Ağaşirin Ağaməmməd oğlu Cəfərov
- Born: 10 July 1906; Balıcallı, Dzhevatsky Uyezd, Baku Governorate, Russian Empire
- Died: 3 May 1984 (aged 77); Neftçala, Neftchala District, Azerbaijan SSR, Soviet Union
- Military career
- Allegiance: Soviet Union
- Branch: Red Army
- Service years: 1941–1945
- Rank: Starshina
- Unit: 416th Rifle Division
- Conflicts: World War II; Battle of the Caucasus; Donbass Strategic Offensive; Battle of the Dnieper
- Awards: Hero of the Soviet Union Order of Lenin Order of the Patriotic War 2nd class

Aghashirin Agamamed oglu Jafarov (Azerbaijani: Ağaşirin Ağaməmməd oğlu Cəfərov; 10 July 1906 – 3 May 1984) was an Azerbaijani Red Army Starshina and a Hero of the Soviet Union. He was awarded the title on 1 November 1943 for his actions during the Battle of the Dnieper, where he was reported to have killed up to 300 German soldiers with his machine gun. He was discharged postwar and worked as chairman of a Kolkhoz.

== Early life ==
Jafarov was born on 10 July 1906 in Balıcallı to a peasant family. He joined the Communist Party of the Soviet Union in 1931. Jafarov received primary education and worked as a tractor driver on a Kolkhoz.

== World War II ==
Jafarov was drafted into the Red Army in October 1941. He graduated from courses for machine gunners and served in combat from November 1942 with the 1368th Rifle Regiment of the 416th Rifle Division. Jafarov fought in the Battle of the Caucasus. For his actions he received the Medal for Battle Merit on 4 May 1943.

Jafarov fought in the Donbass Strategic Offensive (August 1943). Near Taganrog, his squad repelled several German counterattacks and Jafarov reportedly led one of these. The squad reportedly killed more than a platoon of German soldiers, destroyed two machine guns, captured four machine guns, two light machine guns, and ammunition. On the next day his squad was surrounded. Jafarov reportedly organized a perimeter defense and killed 56 German soldiers. The squad broke out and rejoined the battalion.

In October 1943, Jafarov fought in the Melitopol Offensive, part of the Battle of the Dnieper. Near Semenivka on the outskirts of Melitopol, he reportedly took a machine gun and four other soldiers at night and moved behind German lines. Early in the morning his machine gun was located and attacked. Wounded three times, Jafarov reportedly continued to fire, killing up to 300 German soldiers. These actions reportedly diverted a number of German troops, enabling the capture of the heights. On 1 November Jafarov was awarded the title Hero of the Soviet Union and the Order of Lenin.

Jafarov continued to serve with the division during the war. He fought in the Battle of Berlin. On 29 May 1945 he received the Order of the Patriotic War 2nd class for his actions.

== Postwar ==
Jafarov was discharged with the rank of Starshina. He returned to Balıcallı and was kolkhoz chairman. He served on the village council in Neftchala District and also worked in the office of the Aznefterazvedka drilling trust. Jafarov died on 3 May 1984 and was buried in Neftçala.

A street in Neftçala was named for Jafarov.
