= Bayat-e Sofla =

Village in East Azerbaijan province, Iran

Bayat-e Sofla Persian: بيات سفلي
- Village
- Location within Iran
- Coordinates: 37°28′11″N 47°24′38″E
- Country: Iran
- Province: East Azerbaijan
- County: Torkamanchay
- District: Central
- Rural District: Owch Tappeh-ye Gharbi

Population (2016)
  - Total: 149
- Time zone: UTC+3:30 (IRST)

Bayat-e Sofla (Persian: بيات سفلي) (Note: Also romanized as Bayāt-e Soflá; also known as Bayāt-e Pā’īn) is a village in Owch Tappeh-ye Gharbi Rural District of the Central District (Note: Formerly Torkamanchay District of Mianeh County) in Torkamanchay County, East Azerbaijan province, Iran.

== Demographics ==
=== Population ===
At the time of the 2006 National Census, the village's population was 391 in 89 households, when it was in Torkamanchay District (Note: Renamed the Central District of Torkamanchay County) of Mianeh County. The following census in 2011 counted 285 people in 80 households. The 2016 census measured the population of the village as 149 people in 52 households.

In 2024, the district was separated from the county in the establishment of Torkamanchay County and renamed the Central District.
