= Owch Tappeh-ye Gharbi Rural District =

Rural district in East Azerbaijan province, Iran

Owch Tappeh-ye Gharbi Rural District Persian: دهستان اوچ تپه غربي
- Rural District
- Location within Iran
- Coordinates: 37°25′N 47°21′E
- Country: Iran
- Province: East Azerbaijan
- County: Torkamanchay
- District: Central
- Established: 1987
- Capital: Khatunabad

Population (2016)
  - Total: 1,735
- Time zone: UTC+3:30 (IRST)

Owch Tappeh-ye Gharbi Rural District (Persian: دهستان اوچ تپه غربي) is in the Central District (Note: Formerly Torkamanchay District of Mianeh County) of Torkamanchay County, East Azerbaijan province, Iran. Its capital is the village of Khatunabad.

== Demographics ==
=== Population ===
At the time of the 2006 National Census, the rural district's population (as a part of Torkamanchay District (Note: Renamed the Central District in Torkamanchay County) in Mianeh County) was 2,690 in 535 households. There were 2,152 inhabitants in 571 households at the following census of 2011. The 2016 census measured the population of the rural district as 1,735 in 537 households. The most populous of its 18 villages was Qaleh Juq-e Najafqoli Khan, with 447 people.

In 2024, the district was separated from the county in the establishment of Torkamanchay County and renamed the Central District.

=== Other villages in the rural district ===
- Bayat-e Sofla
- Golujeh-ye Ghami
- Istgah-e Sheykh Safi
- Kesajin
- Navliq
- Qabaq Tappeh,
- Seyyedlar
- Sheykh Tabaq
