= Sowmaeh, Torkamanchay =

Village in East Azerbaijan province, Iran

Sowmaeh Persian: صومعه
- Village
- Location within Iran
- Coordinates: 37°36′38″N 47°27′58″E
- Country: Iran
- Province: East Azerbaijan
- County: Torkamanchay
- District: Sowmaeh
- Rural District: Barvanan-e Sharqi

Population (2016)
  - Total: 2,432
- Time zone: UTC+3:30 (IRST)

Sowmaeh (Persian: صومعه) (Note: Formerly known as Sowmaeh-ye Olya (صومعه عليا), also romanized as Şowma‘eh-ye ‘Olyā and Şowme‘eh-ye ‘Olyā; also known as Şowma‘eh-ye Bālā and Şowme‘eh Bālā) is a village in Barvanan-e Sharqi Rural District of Sowmaeh District in Torkamanchay County, East Azerbaijan province, Iran, serving as capital of both the district and the rural district.

== Demographics ==
=== Population ===
At the time of the 2006 National Census, the village's population was 3,014 in 765 households, when it was in Torkamanchay District (Note: Renamed the Central District of Torkamanchay County) of Mianeh County. The following census in 2011 counted 3,123 people in 918 households. The 2016 census measured the population of the village as 2,432 people in 791 households. It was the most populous village in its rural district.

In 2024, the district was separated from the county in the establishment of Torkamanchay County and renamed the Central District. The rural district was transferred to the new Sowmaeh District.
