= Balıcallı =

- Location within Azerbaijan
- Coordinates: 39°24′43″N 49°04′47″E
- Country: Azerbaijan
- Rayon: Neftchala
- Municipality: Boyat
- Time zone: UTC+4 (AZT)
  - Summer (DST): UTC+5 (AZT)

Balıcallı (also, Ballydzhaly and Baladzhali) is a village in the Neftchala Rayon of Azerbaijan. The village forms part of the municipality of Boyat.

== Notable natives ==
- Aghashirin Jafarov/Saltis — Hero of the Soviet Union.
