= Torkamanchay =

City in East Azerbaijan province, Iran

Torkamanchay Persian: ترکمانچای
- City
- Location within Iran
- Coordinates: 37°34′44″N 47°23′34″E
- Country: Iran
- Province: East Azerbaijan
- County: Torkamanchay
- District: Central

Population (2016)
  - Total: 7,443
- Time zone: UTC+3:30 (IRST)

Torkamanchay (Persian: ترکمانچای) (Note: Also romanized as Torkamān Chāy, Torkamānchāi, Torkamānchāy, Torkmancāy, Turcoman Chie, Turkemanchay, Turkmanchai, Turkmānchāi, and Turkomanchay; also known simply as Torkamān) is a city in the Central District (Note: Formerly Torkamanchay District of Mianeh County) of Torkamanchay County, East Azerbaijan province, Iran, serving as capital of both the county and the district. It was the administrative center for Barvanan-e Markazi Rural District until its capital was transferred to the village of Khvajeh Ghias. A suburb of Mianeh, it is well known for the Treaty of Turkmenchay of 1828.

== Demographics ==
=== Population ===
At the time of the 2006 National Census, the city's population was 6,434 in 1,645 households, when it was in Torkamanchay District (Note: Renamed the Central District of Torkamanchay County) of Mianeh County. The following census in 2011 counted 7,094 people in 1,984 households. The 2016 census measured the population of the city as 7,443 people in 2,366 households.

In 2024, the district was separated from the county in the establishment of Torkamanchay County and renamed the Central District, with Torkamanchay as the new county's capital.

== See also ==
- Treaty of Turkmenchay
- Treaty of Gulistan
