= Dördlər, Xol Qarabucaq =

Dördlər
- Location within Azerbaijan
- Coordinates: 39°19′02″N 48°48′28″E
- Country: Azerbaijan
- Rayon: Neftchala
- Municipality: Xol Qarabucaq
- Time zone: UTC+4 (AZT)
  - Summer (DST): UTC+5 (AZT)

Dördlər (also, Dortlyar) is a village in the Neftchala Rayon of Azerbaijan. The village forms part of the municipality of Xol Qarabucaq.
