= Sowmaeh, Charuymaq =

Sowmaeh صومعه
- Village
- Location within Iran
- Coordinates: 37°07′51″N 47°10′44″E
- Country: Iran
- Province: East Azerbaijan
- County: Charuymaq
- Bakhsh: Shadian
- Rural District: Charuymaq-e Sharqi

Population (2006)
  - Total: 92
- Time zone: UTC+3:30 (IRST)
  - Summer (DST): UTC+4:30 (IRDT)

Sowmaeh (Persian: صومعه, also Romanized as Şowma‘eh) is a village in Charuymaq-e Sharqi Rural District, Shadian District, Charuymaq County, East Azerbaijan Province, Iran. At the 2006 census, its population was 92, in 17 families.
