= Xol Qarabucaq =

- Municipality
- Location within Azerbaijan
- Coordinates: 39°17′55″N 48°49′36″E
- Country: Azerbaijan
- Rayon: Neftchala

Population
  - Total: 3,789
- Time zone: UTC+4 (AZT)
  - Summer (DST): UTC+5 (AZT)

Xol Qarabucaq (also, Xolqarabucaq and Kholkarabudzhak) is a village and municipality in the Neftchala Rayon of Azerbaijan. It has a population of 3,789. The municipality consists of the villages of Xol Qarabucaq, Xoltəzəkənd, and Dördlər.
