= Sowmaeh, Heris =

Sowmaeh صومعه
- Village
- Location within Iran
- Coordinates: 38°18′29″N 47°02′41″E
- Country: Iran
- Province: East Azerbaijan
- County: Heris
- Bakhsh: Central
- Rural District: Bedevostan-e Sharqi

Population (2006)
  - Total: 208
- Time zone: UTC+3:30 (IRST)
  - Summer (DST): UTC+4:30 (IRDT)

Sowmaeh (Persian: صومعه, also Romanized as Şowma‘eh) is a village in Bedevostan-e Sharqi Rural District, in the Central District of Heris County, East Azerbaijan Province, Iran. At the 2006 census, its population was 208, in 42 families.
