= Sowmaeh, Kaleybar =

Sowmaeh صومعه
- Village
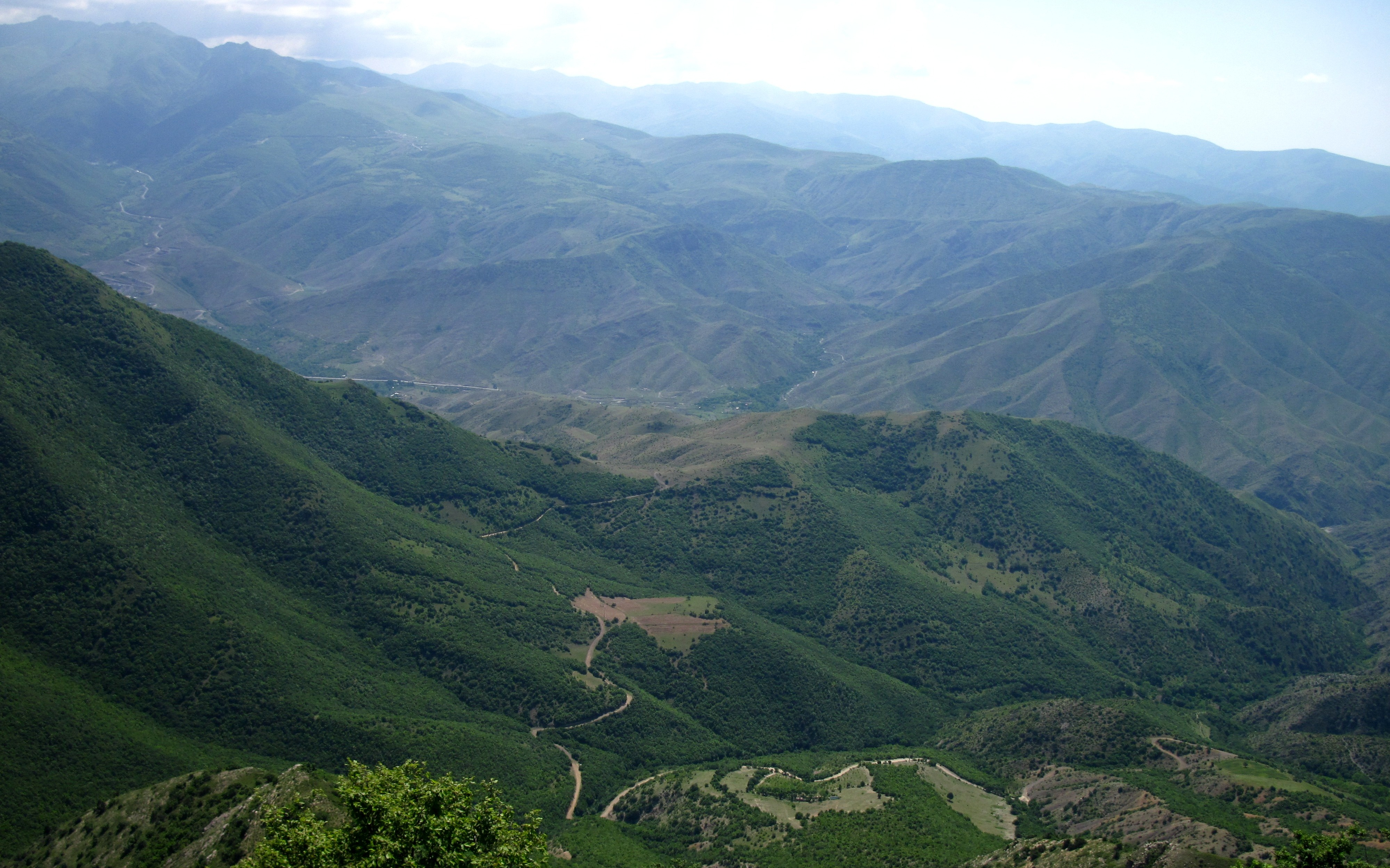
- Village view in June 2013

- Location within Iran
- Coordinates: 38°55′00″N 47°04′00″E
- Country: Iran
- Province: East Azerbaijan
- County: Kaleybar
- Bakhsh: Central
- Rural District: Yeylaq

Population (2006)
  - Total: 13
- Time zone: UTC+3:30 (IRST)
  - Summer (DST): UTC+4:30 (IRDT)

Sowmaeh (Persian: صومعه (کلیبر), also Romanized as Şowma‘eh) is a village in Yeylaq Rural District, in the Central District of Kaleybar County, East Azerbaijan Province, Iran. At the 2006 census, its population was 13, in 5 families. This a significant decline from the population of 37 in late 1940s.
