= Bay'at al-Imam =

Jordanian Salafi jihadist militant group

- Founders: Abu Musab al-Zarqawi; Abu Muhammad al-Maqdisi
- Dates active: 1993–1999
- Country: Jordan
- Headquarters: Al Jafr prison
- Ideology: Takfirism; Qutbism; Salafi jihadism; Wahabism; Islamic extremism; Sectarianism; Anti-Shi'ism

Bay'at al-Imam (Arabic: بيعة الإمام, lit. 'Pledge of allegiance to the Imam') was a jihadist group active from 1993 to 1999, led by Abu Muhammad al-Maqdisi and later Abu Musab al-Zarqawi. Some scholars dispute the group's existence.

The group was founded in Zarqa, Jordan in 1993 when Zarqawi helped al-Maqdisi gather a group of veteran Afghan Arab mujahedeen fighters to stage a coup to overthrow the Jordanian government. The group was primarily active from 1995 to 1999.

In 1997 the State Security Court of Jordan convicted 10 members of the group on charges including manufacturing explosives, handing down sentences up to life imprisonment, and in the case of Salem Bakhit and Ahmad Khaled, life plus 10 years for the murder of a French diplomat in his driveway. Zarqawi would later be given a death sentence in absentia. An internet biography of the pre-9/11 life of Zarqawi attributed to Al-Qaeda commander Saif al-Adel, said that Al-Qaeda core followed these trials closely.

According to The Targeter by Nada Bakos, the chief targeting officer who led the CIA's efforts to track down Zarqawi, and Black Flags by Joby Warrick, the group's first mission to bomb a theater showing pornographic films went awry when Eid Jahaline, the jihadist sent to place the time bomb in the theater became so enthralled with the pornography being shown that he lost track of time and forgot to leave prior to detonation, amputating both of his legs.

== Relations with other terror groups ==
Tajik intelligence has claimed links between Bay'at al-Imam, Bayat - a Tajik Islamic organization, and the Islamic Movement of Uzbekistan, an organization affiliated with Al-Qaeda.
