= Sowmeeh, Maragheh =

Sowmeeh صومعه
- Village
- Location within Iran
- Coordinates: 37°31′53″N 46°19′27″E
- Country: Iran
- Province: East Azerbaijan
- County: Maragheh
- Bakhsh: Central
- Rural District: Sarajuy-ye Gharbi

Population (2006)
  - Total: 350
- Time zone: UTC+3:30 (IRST)
  - Summer (DST): UTC+4:30 (IRDT)

Sowmeeh (Persian: صومعه, also Romanized as Şowme‘eh; also known as Şowme‘eh-ye Ashān) is a village in Sarajuy-ye Gharbi Rural District, in the Central District of Maragheh County, East Azerbaijan Province, Iran. At the 2006 census, its population was 350, in 71 families.
