= Sowmeeh, Ahar =

Sowmeeh صومعه
- Village
- Location within Iran
- Coordinates: 38°34′35″N 46°59′49″E
- Country: Iran
- Province: East Azerbaijan
- County: Ahar
- Bakhsh: Central
- Rural District: Owch Hacha

Population (2006)
  - Total: 79
- Time zone: UTC+3:30 (IRST)
  - Summer (DST): UTC+4:30 (IRDT)

Sowmeeh (Persian: صومعه, also Romanized as Şowme‘eh) is a village in Owch Hacha Rural District, in the Central District of Ahar County, East Azerbaijan Province, Iran. At the 2006 census, its population was 79, in 18 families.
