= Sowmeeh-ye Sang =

Sowmeeh-ye Sang صومعه سنگ
- Village
- Location within Iran
- Coordinates: 37°34′18″N 47°02′34″E
- Country: Iran
- Province: East Azerbaijan
- County: Hashtrud
- Bakhsh: Central
- Rural District: Kuhsar

Population (2006)
  - Total: 55
- Time zone: UTC+3:30 (IRST)
  - Summer (DST): UTC+4:30 (IRDT)

Sowmeeh-ye Sang (Persian: صومعه سنگ, also Romanized as Şowme‘eh-ye Sang; also known as Şowma‘eh) is a village in Kuhsar Rural District, in the Central District of Hashtrud County, East Azerbaijan Province, Iran. At the 2006 census, its population was 55, in 8 families.
