= Dördlər, Boyat =

Dortlyar
- Location within Azerbaijan
- Coordinates: 39°28′N 49°05′E
- Country: Azerbaijan
- Rayon: Neftchala
- Municipality: Boyat
- Time zone: UTC+4 (AZT)
  - Summer (DST): UTC+5 (AZT)

Dortlyar (also, Dortlar) is a village in the Neftchala Rayon of Azerbaijan. The village forms part of the municipality of Boyat.
