= Dördlər, Fuzuli =

Dördlər
- Location within Azerbaijan Location within Karabakh Economic Region
- Coordinates: 39°42′41.9″N 47°09′35.8″E
- Country: Azerbaijan
- District: Fuzuli
- Time zone: UTC+4 (AZT)
  - Summer (DST): UTC+5 (AZT)

Dördlər (Dordler) is a village in the Fuzuli District of Azerbaijan.
