= Barvanan-e Markazi Rural District =

Rural district in East Azerbaijan province, Iran

Barvanan-e Markazi Rural District Persian: دهستان بروانان مركزئ
- Rural District
- Location within Iran
- Coordinates: 37°38′N 47°23′E
- Country: Iran
- Province: East Azerbaijan
- County: Torkamanchay
- District: Central
- Established: 1987
- Capital: Khvajeh Ghias

Population (2016)
  - Total: 1,721
- Time zone: UTC+3:30 (IRST)

Barvanan-e Markazi Rural District (Persian: دهستان بروانان مركزئ) is in the Central District (Note: Formerly Torkamanchay District of Mianeh County) of Torkamanchay County, East Azerbaijan province, Iran. Its capital is the village of Khvajeh Ghias. The rural district was previously administered from the city of Torkamanchay.

== Demographics ==
=== Population ===
At the time of the 2006 National Census, the rural district's population (as a part of Torkamanchay District (Note: Renamed the Central District of Torkamanchay County) in Mianeh County) was 2,174 in 490 households. There were 1,606 inhabitants in 447 households at the following census of 2011. The 2016 census measured the population of the rural district as 1,721 in 595 households. The most populous of its eight villages was Varzeqan, with 1,015 people.

In 2024, the district was separated from the county in the establishment of Torkamanchay County and renamed the Central District.

=== Other villages in the rural district ===
- Kuhsalar-e Olya
- Kuhsalar-e Sofla
- Owranjaq
