= Treaty of Turkmenchay =

1828 agreement between Qajar Iran and the Russian Empire

Treaty concluded between His Majesty the Emperor of All the Russias and His Majesty the Shah of Persia
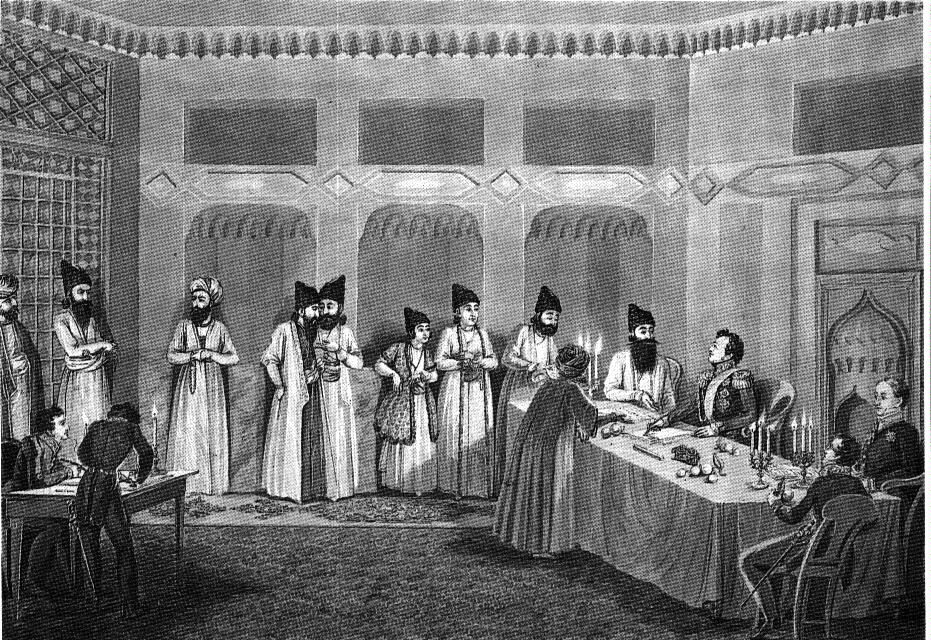
- Signing ceremony of the treaty
- Signed: 22 February 1828; 198 years ago
- Location: Turkmenchay, Qajar Iran
- Signatories: (Russian Empire) Ivan Paskevich; (Qajar Iran) Abbas Mirza; (Qajar Iran) Mirza Abolhassan Khan Ilchi
- Languages: Persian; Russian

The Treaty of Turkmenchay (Note: Persian: عهدنامه ترکمانچای, romanized: Ahdnâme-ye Torkmânchây, pronounced [ʔæɦdnɒːˈmeje tʰoɹkmɒːnˈt͡ʃʰɒːj]; Russian: Туркманчайский договор, romanized: Turkmančajskij dogovor, pronounced [tʊrkmɐnˈt͡ɕajskʲɪj dəɡɐˈvor]) was an agreement between Qajar Iran and the Russian Empire, which concluded the Russo-Persian War (1826–1828). It was second of the series of treaties (the first was the 1813 Treaty of Gulistan and the last, the 1881 Treaty of Akhal) signed between Qajar Iran and Imperial Russia that forced Iran to cede or recognize Russian influence over the territories that formerly were part of Iran.

The treaty was signed on 22 February 1828 (5 Sha'ban 1243) in Torkamanchay (a village between Tabriz and Tehran). It made Iran cede the control of several areas in the South Caucasus to Russia: the Erivan Khanate, the Nakhchivan Khanate and the remainder of the Talysh Khanate. The boundary between Russia and Iran was set at the Aras River. These territories are now Armenia, the south of the Republic of Azerbaijan, Nakhchivan and Iğdır Province (now part of Turkey).

The treaty was signed for Iran by the Crown Prince Abbas Mirza and Allah-Yar Khan Asef al-Dowleh, chancellor to Fath-Ali Shah Qajar, and for Russia by General Ivan Paskievich. Similarly to the 1813 Treaty of Gulistan, the treaty was imposed on Iran following a Russian military victory. Paskievich threatened to occupy Tehran in five days unless the treaty was signed.

Following this treaty, as well as the Treaty of Gulistan, Russia completed its conquest of the Caucasian territories from Qajar Iran; what is now Dagestan, eastern Georgia, Azerbaijan, and Armenia, all of which had formed part of its very concept for centuries. The areas north of the Aras River, such as the territory of the contemporary nations of Georgia, Azerbaijan, Armenia and the North Caucasian Republic of Dagestan, were Iranian until they were conquered by Russia during the 19th century.

Following the two treaties, the formerly Iranian territories came under Russian, and later Soviet control for approximately 180 years, where Dagestan remains a constituent republic within the Russian Federation to this day. Comprising most of the territory ceded in the Gulistan and Turkmenchay treaties, three separate nations would gain independence following the dissolution of the Soviet Union in 1991: namely Georgia, Azerbaijan and Armenia.

== Terms ==
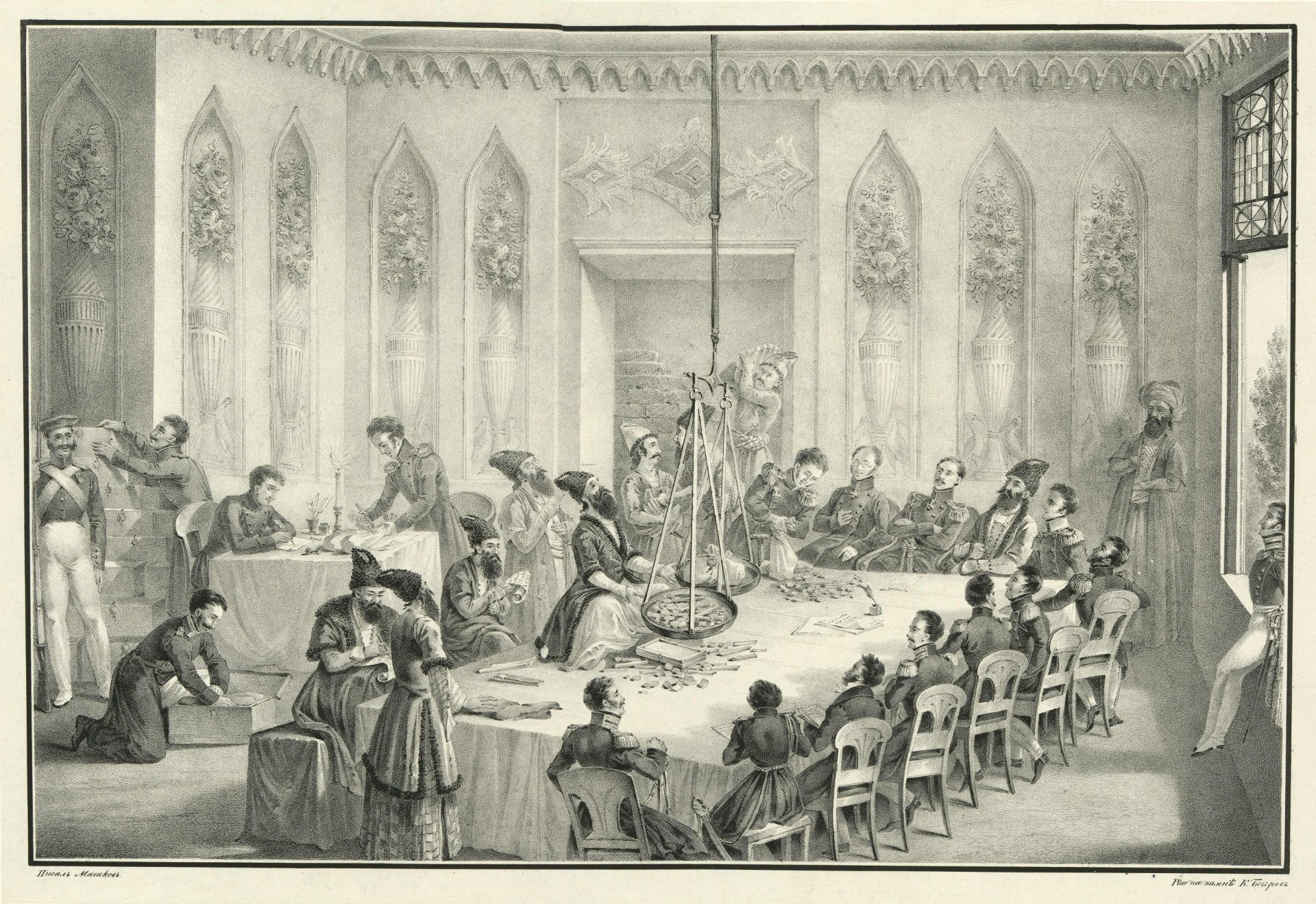
Persian payment of indemnity in Tabriz

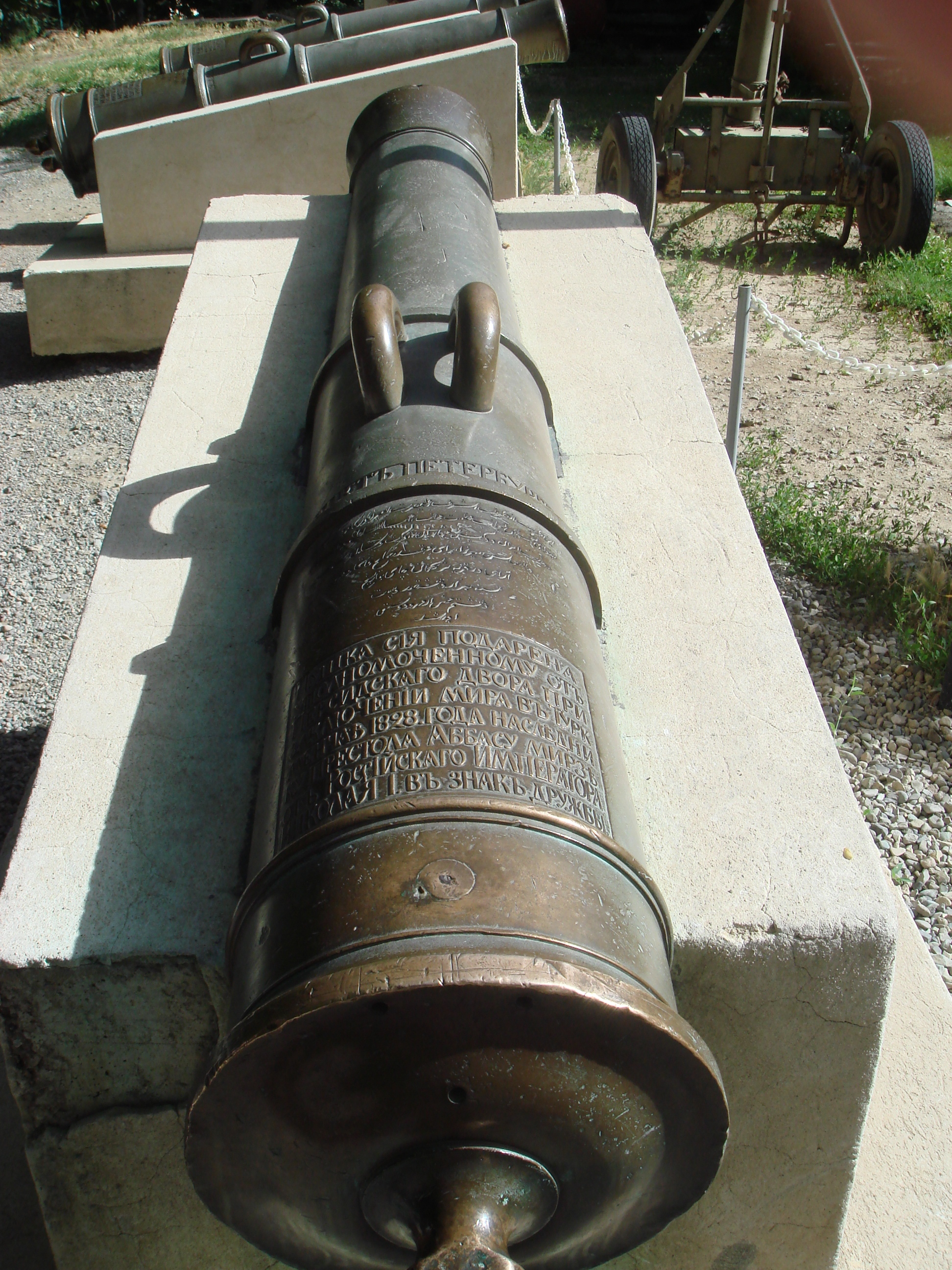
Treaty of Turkmenchay Cannon in Military Museum of Tehran

The terms of the treaty are as follows:

- Article 4: Persia ceded the Erivan Khanate (most of present-day central Armenia), the Nakhchivan Khanate (most of the present-day Nakhchivan Autonomous Republic of Azerbaijan), the Talysh Khanate (southeastern Azerbaijan), and the Ordubad and Mughan regions (now also part of Azerbaijan) and also reiterated the cessions made to Russia in the Treaty of Gulistan
- Article 6: Persia promised to pay Russia 10 korur in gold or 20 million silver rubles (in 1828 currency).
- Article 7: Russia promised to support Abbas Mirza as the heir to the throne of Persia on the death of Shah Fath Ali (the clause became moot when Abbas Mirza predeceased Shah Fath Ali).
- Article 8: Persian ships lost full rights to navigate all of the Caspian Sea and its coasts, which were given to Russia.
- Persia recognised capitulation rights for Russian subjects in Persia.
- Article 10: Russia gained the right to send consular envoys anywhere in Persia.
- Article 10: both parties accept commercial treaties with detailed conditions.
- Article 13: prisoners-of-war were exchanged.
- Persia officially apologised for breaking its promises made in the Treaty of Gulistan.
- Article 15: Shah Fath Ali Shah promised not to charge or persecute any inhabitant or official in the region of Iranian Azerbaijan for any deed carried out during the war or during the temporary control of the region by Russian troops. In addition, all inhabitants of the aforementioned district were given the right to move from Persian districts to Russian districts within one year.

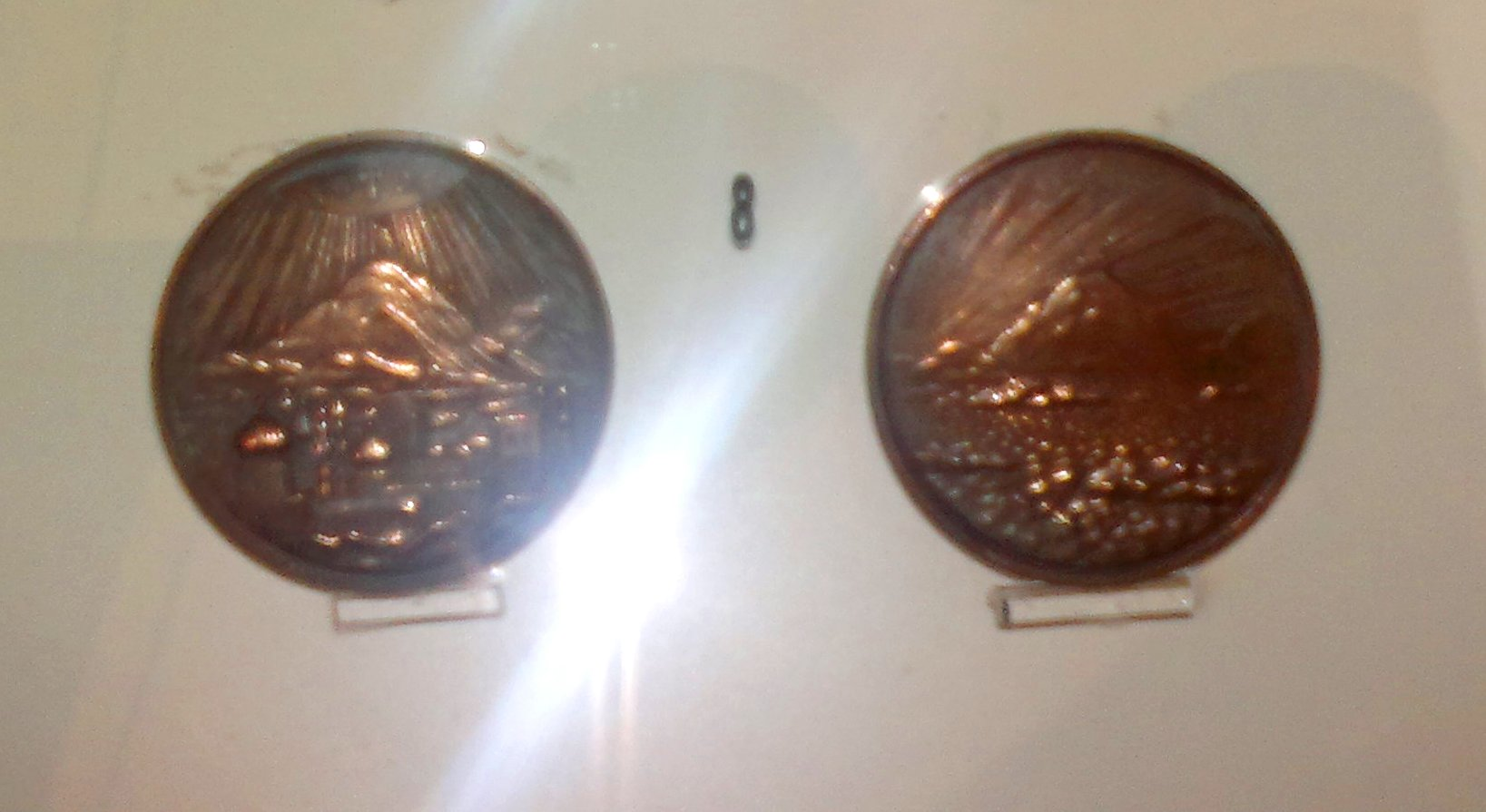
"Treaty of Turkmanchay" memorial medals. Museum of History of Azerbaijan, Baku.

Article 15 provided for the resettlement of Armenians from Iranian Azerbaijan to the Caucasus, which also included an outright liberation of Armenians taken captive by Persia since 1804 or 1795. This resettlement replaced the 20,000 Armenians who moved to Georgia between 1795 and 1827.

== Aftermath ==
According to Prof. Alexander Mikaberidze:

Under article 4 of the treaty, Iran ceded sovereignty over the Khanates of Yerevan, Nakchivan, Talysh, Ordubad, and Mughan in addition to regions that Russia had annexed under the Treaty of Gulistan (1813). The Aras River was declared the new border between Iran and Russia. In articles 6–8, Iran agreed to pay reparations of 20 million rubles in silver and transferred to Russia the exclusive rights to maintain a Caspian fleet. In addition, the capitulatory rights guaranteed Russia preferential treatment for its exports, which generally were not competitive in European markets. In article 10, the shah recognized Russia's right to send consulate envoys to anywhere in Iran. The Treaty of Turkmenchay was the definite acknowledgement of the Persian loss of the Caucasus region to Russia.

According to the Cambridge History of Iran:

Even when rulers on the plateau lacked the means to effect suzerainty beyond the Aras, the neighboring Khanates were still regarded as Iranian dependencies. Naturally, it was those Khanates located closest to the province of Āzarbāījān which most frequently experienced attempts to re-impose Iranian suzerainty: the Khanates of Erivan, Nakhchivān and Qarābāgh across the Aras, and the cis-Aras Khanate of Ṭālish, with its administrative headquarters located at Lankarān and therefore very vulnerable to pressure, either from the direction of Tabrīz or Rasht. Beyond the Khanate of Qarābāgh, the Khān of Ganja and the Vāli of Gurjistān (ruler of the Kartli-Kakheti kingdom of south-east Georgia), although less accessible for purposes of coercion, were also regarded as the Shah's vassals, as were the Khāns of Shakki and Shīrvān, north of the Kura river. The contacts between Iran and the Khanates of Bākū and Qubba, however, were more tenuous and consisted mainly of maritime commercial links with Anzalī and Rasht. The effectiveness of these somewhat haphazard assertions of suzerainty depended on the ability of a particular Shah to make his will felt, and the determination of the local khans to evade obligations they regarded as onerous.

In combination with the 1813 Treaty of Gulistan, some authors have claimed that the two resulting Iranian territorial cessions separated the Azerbaijani people and the Talysh people from their brethren in Iran. Following the two treaties, the formerly Iranian territories came under the Russian, and later the Soviet control for approximately 180 years, and Dagestan remains a constituent republic within the Russian Federation to this day. Comprising most of the territory ceded in Gulistan and Turkmenchay treaties, three separate nations would gain independence following the dissolution of the Soviet Union in 1991: Georgia, Azerbaijan and Armenia.

== Repatriation of Armenians ==
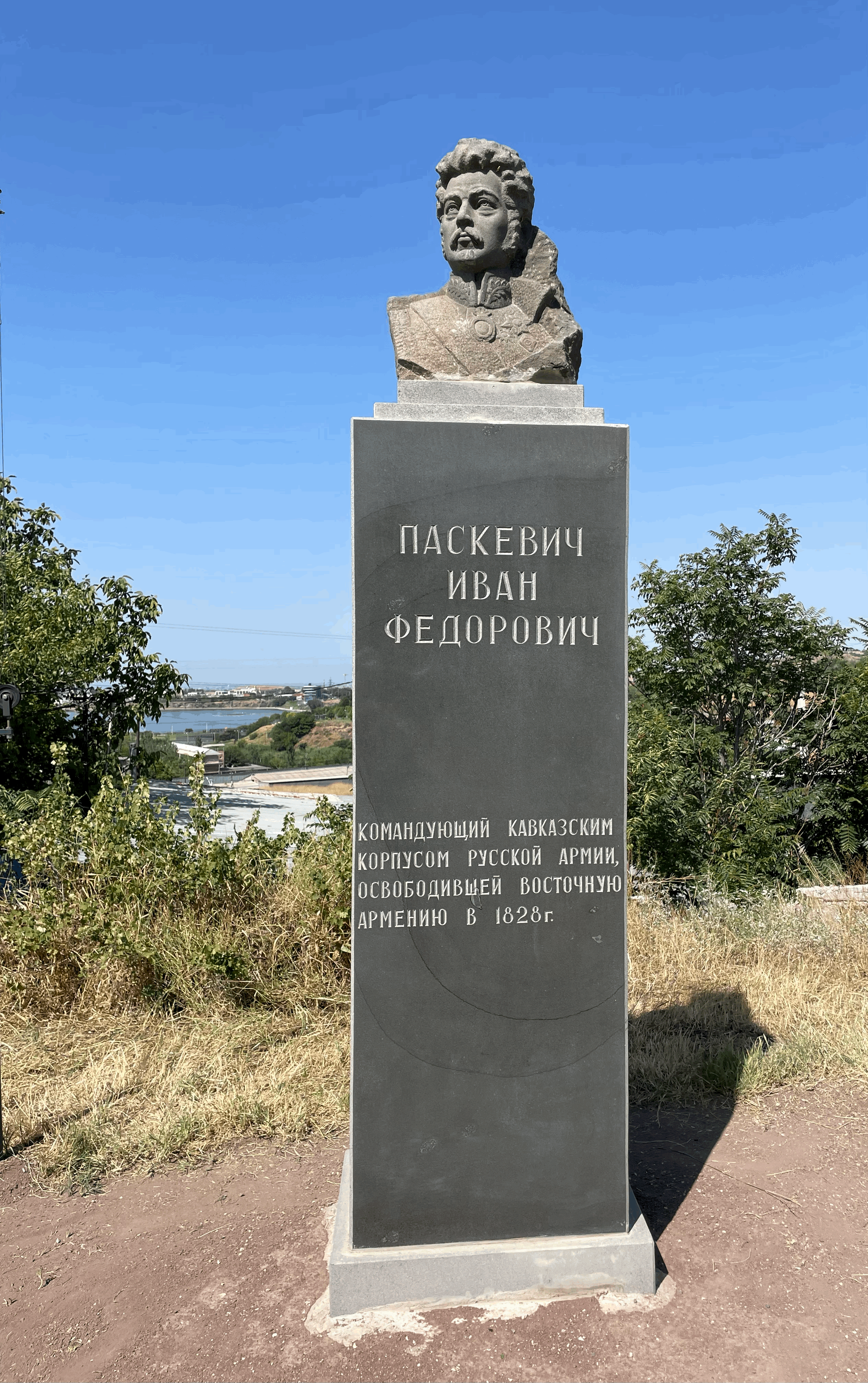
Ivan Paskevich Monument, Yerevan

Under the 15th term of the Treaty of Turkmenchay, Armenians from the Iranian Azerbaijan Province were given the freedom to emigrate to Russian-controlled territory north of the Aras River. In the period 1828–1831 following Russia's annexation, 45,000 Armenians from Iran and 100,000 from the Ottoman Empire immigrated to Russian Armenia. Beginning in October 1829, 7,668 families immigrated to Russian Armenia; ultimately, 14,047 families consisting of 90,000–100,000 people had immigrated.

== Massacre at Russian embassy ==
In the aftermath of the war and the signing of the treaty, anti-Russian sentiment was widespread in Persia. On 11 February 1829, an angry mob stormed the Russian embassy in Tehran and killed almost everyone inside. Among those killed in the massacre was the newly-appointed ambassador to Persia, Aleksander Griboyedov, a celebrated Russian playwright. Griboyedov had played an active role in negotiating the terms of the treaty. As a sign of his apology for the murder of the Russian ambassador, the Shah of Iran presented the Russian Czar with his most valuable crown jewel, the Shah Diamond.

== See also ==
- Armenia–Iran border
- Azerbaijan–Iran border
- Anglo-Russian Convention
- Iran–Russia relations
- List of treaties
- Treaty of Akhal
- Treaty of Gulistan

== Sources ==
- H. Pir Nia, Abbas Eghbal Ashtiani, B. Agheli. History of Persia. Tehran, 2002. p. 673–686. ISBN 964-6895-16-6
- Fisher, William Bayne; Avery, P.; Hambly, G. R. G; Melville, C. (1991). The Cambridge History of Iran. Vol. 7. Cambridge: Cambridge University Press. ISBN 0521200954.
