= Sowmeeh-ye Kuchak =

Village in Razavi Khorasan, Iran

Sowmeeh-ye Kuchak صومعه كوچك
- Village
- Location within Iran
- Coordinates: 35°33′35″N 59°48′32″E
- Country: Iran
- Province: Razavi Khorasan
- County: Fariman
- Bakhsh: Qalandarabad
- Rural District: Qalandarabad

Population (2006)
  - Total: 53
- Time zone: UTC+3:30 (IRST)
  - Summer (DST): UTC+4:30 (IRDT)

Sowmeeh-ye Kuchak (Persian: صومعه كوچك, also Romanized as Şowme‘eh-ye Kūchak; also known as Şowma‘eh-ye Pā’īn) is a village in Qalandarabad Rural District, Qalandarabad District, Fariman County, Razavi Khorasan Province, Iran. At the 2006 census, its population was 53, in 11 families.
