= Sowmaeh Zarrin, Aghmiyun =

Sowmaeh Zarrin صومعه زرين
- Village
- Location within Iran
- Coordinates: 38°01′23″N 47°40′40″E
- Country: Iran
- Province: East Azerbaijan
- County: Sarab
- Bakhsh: Central
- Rural District: Aghmiyun

Population (2006)
  - Total: 111
- Time zone: UTC+3:30 (IRST)
  - Summer (DST): UTC+4:30 (IRDT)

Sowmaeh Zarrin (Persian: صومعه زرين, also Romanized as Şowma‘eh Zarrīn; also known as Şowme‘eh) is a village in Aghmiyun Rural District, in the Central District of Sarab County, East Azerbaijan Province, Iran. At the 2006 census, its population was 111, in 15 families.
