= Bayat, Razavi Khorasan =

Bayat بيات
- Village
- Location within Iran
- Coordinates: 37°22′17″N 59°03′13″E
- Country: Iran
- Province: Razavi Khorasan
- County: Dargaz
- Bakhsh: Chapeshlu
- Rural District: Qara Bashlu

Population (2006)
  - Total: 96
- Time zone: UTC+3:30 (IRST)
  - Summer (DST): UTC+4:30 (IRDT)

Bayat (Persian: بيات, also Romanized as Bayāt) is a village in Qara Bashlu Rural District, Chapeshlu District, Dargaz County, Razavi Khorasan Province, Iran. At the 2006 census, its population was 96, in 26 families.
