= Bayat, East Azerbaijan =

Bayat بيات
- Village
- Location within Iran
- Coordinates: 37°25′03″N 47°00′27″E
- Country: Iran
- Province: East Azerbaijan
- County: Hashtrud
- Bakhsh: Central
- Rural District: Qaranqu

Population (2006)
  - Total: 185
- Time zone: UTC+3:30 (IRST)
  - Summer (DST): UTC+4:30 (IRDT)

Bayat (Persian: بيات, also Romanized as Bayāt) is a village in Qaranqu Rural District, in the Central District of Hashtrud County, East Azerbaijan Province, Iran. At the 2006 census, its population was 185, in 35 families.
