= Sowmeeh-ye Bozorg =

Sowmeeh-ye Bozorg صومعه بزرگ
- Village
- Location within Iran
- Coordinates: 35°33′30″N 59°48′49″E
- Country: Iran
- Province: Razavi Khorasan
- County: Fariman
- Bakhsh: Qalandarabad
- Rural District: Qalandarabad

Population (2006)
  - Total: 83
- Time zone: UTC+3:30 (IRST)
  - Summer (DST): UTC+4:30 (IRDT)

Sowmeeh-ye Bozorg (Persian: صومعه بزرگ, also Romanized as Şowme‘eh-ye Bozorg; also known as Şowma‘eh-ye Bālā) is a village in Qalandarabad Rural District, Qalandarabad District, Fariman County, Razavi Khorasan Province, Iran. At the 2006 census, its population was 83, in 17 families.
