= Boyat, Aghjabadi =

Boyat
- Municipality
- Location within Azerbaijan Location within Karabakh Economic Region
- Coordinates: 40°02′54″N 47°08′00″E
- Country: Azerbaijan
- Rayon: Aghjabadi
- Elevation: 159 m (522 ft)

Population
  - Total: 1,662
- Time zone: UTC+4 (AZT)
  - Summer (DST): UTC+5 (AZT)

Boyat (also, Boyad and Bayat) is a village and municipality in the Aghjabadi Rayon of Azerbaijan with a population of 1,662.
