= Boyat, Ujar =

Boyat
- Municipality
- Location within Azerbaijan
- Coordinates: 40°23′42″N 47°45′00″E
- Country: Azerbaijan
- Rayon: Ujar

Population
  - Total: 2,404
- Time zone: UTC+4 (AZT)
  - Summer (DST): UTC+5 (AZT)

Boyat (also, Bayat) is a village and municipality in the Ujar Rayon of Azerbaijan. It has a population of 2,404.
