= Boyat, Neftchala =

Boyat
- Municipality
- Location within Azerbaijan
- Coordinates: 39°24′05″N 49°05′03″E
- Country: Azerbaijan
- Rayon: Neftchala

Population
  - Total: 2,472
- Time zone: UTC+4 (AZT)
  - Summer (DST): UTC+5 (AZT)

Boyat (or Bayat) is a village and municipality in the Neftchala Rayon of Azerbaijan. It has a population of 2,472. The municipality consists of the villages of Boyat, Balıcallı, and Dördlər.
