= Boyat, Shamakhi =

Boyat
- Location within Azerbaijan
- Coordinates: 40°34′50″N 48°39′19″E
- Country: Azerbaijan
- Rayon: Shamakhi
- Time zone: UTC+4 (AZT)
  - Summer (DST): UTC+5 (AZT)

Boyat (also, Bayat) is a village in the Shamakhi Rayon of Azerbaijan.
