= Barvanan-e Gharbi Rural District =

Rural district in East Azerbaijan province, Iran

Barvanan-e Gharbi Rural District Persian: دهستان بروانان غربي
- Rural District
- Location within Iran
- Coordinates: 37°37′N 47°17′E
- Country: Iran
- Province: East Azerbaijan
- County: Torkamanchay
- District: Central
- Established: 1987
- Capital: Gharib Dust

Population (2016)
  - Total: 4,132
- Time zone: UTC+3:30 (IRST)

Barvanan-e Gharbi Rural District (Persian: دهستان بروانان غربي) is in the Central District (Note: Formerly Torkamanchay District of Mianeh County) of Torkamanchay County, East Azerbaijan province, Iran. Its capital is the village of Gharib Dust.

== Demographics ==
=== Population ===
At the time of the 2006 National Census, the rural district's population (as a part of Torkamanchay District (Note: Renamed the Central District of Torkamanchay County) in Mianeh County) was 5,679 in 1,262 households. There were 4,472 inhabitants in 1,279 households at the following census of 2011. The 2016 census measured the population of the rural district as 4,132 in 1,412 households. The most populous of its 22 villages was Kalhor, with 779 people.

In 2024, the district was separated from the county in the establishment of Torkamanchay County and renamed the Central District.

=== Other villages in the rural district ===
- Gug Daraq
- Mehmandust
- Sanyan-e Sofla
- Yalquz Aghaj
- Yengejeh
