= Barvanan-e Sharqi Rural District =

Rural district in East Azerbaijan province, Iran

Barvanan-e Sharqi Rural District Persian: دهستان بروانان شرقي
- Rural District
- Location within Iran
- Coordinates: 37°37′N 47°28′E
- Country: Iran
- Province: East Azerbaijan
- County: Torkamanchay
- District: Sowmaeh
- Established: 1987
- Capital: Sowmaeh

Population (2016)
  - Total: 6,356
- Time zone: UTC+3:30 (IRST)

Barvanan-e Sharqi Rural District (Persian: دهستان بروانان شرقي) is in Sowmaeh District of Torkamanchay County, East Azerbaijan province, Iran. Its capital is the village of Sowmaeh. (Note: Formerly Sowmaeh-ye Olya)

== Demographics ==
=== Population ===
At the time of the 2006 National Census, the rural district's population (as a part of Torkamanchay District (Note: Renamed the Central District of Torkamanchay County) in Mianeh County) was 8,304 in 2,003 households. There were 7,400 inhabitants in 2,134 households at the following census of 2011. The 2016 census measured the population of the rural district as 6,356 in 2,148 households. The most populous of its 16 villages was Sowmaeh-ye Olya, (Note: Renamed Sowmaeh) with 2,432 people.

In 2024, the district was separated from the county in the establishment of Torkamanchay County and renamed the Central District. The rural district was transferred to the new Sowmaeh District.

=== Other villages in the rural district ===
- Bolukan
- Dastjerd
- Varnakesh
