= Sowmaeh District =

District in East Azerbaijan province, Iran

Sowmaeh District Persian: بخش صومعه
- District
- Location within Iran
- Coordinates: 37°37′N 47°30′E
- Country: Iran
- Province: East Azerbaijan
- County: Torkamanchay
- Established: 2024
- Capital: Sowmaeh
- Time zone: UTC+3:30 (IRST)

Sowmaeh District (Persian: بخش صومعه) is in Torkamanchay County of East Azerbaijan province, Iran. Its capital is the village of Sowmaeh, (Note: Formerly Sowmaeh-ye Olya) whose population at the time of the 2016 National Census was 2,432 people in 791 households.

== History ==
In 2024, Torkamanchay District (Note: Renamed the Central District of Torkamanchay County) was separated from Mianeh County in the establishment of Torkamanchay County and renamed the Central District. The new county was divided into two districts and five rural districts, with Torkamanchay as its capital and only city at the time.

== Demographics ==
=== Administrative divisions ===
Sowmaeh District
Administrative Divisions
Barvanan-e Sharqi RD
Gavineh Rud RD
RD = Rural District
