= Torkamanchay County =

County in East Azerbaijan province, Iran

Torkamanchay County Persian: شهرستان ترکمانچای
- County
- Location of Torkamanchay County in East Azerbaijan province (bottom right, yellow)

- Location of East Azerbaijan province in Iran
- Coordinates: 37°33′N 47°24′E
- Country: Iran
- Province: East Azerbaijan
- Established: 2024
- Capital: Torkamanchay
- Districts: Central, Sowmaeh
- Time zone: UTC+3:30 (IRST)

Torkamanchay County (Persian: شهرستان ترکمانچای) is in East Azerbaijan province, Iran. Its capital is the city of Torkamanchay, whose population at the time of the 2016 National Census was 7,443 people in 2,366 households.

== History ==
The city of Torkamanchay is where the Treaty of Turkmenchay was signed by Russia and Iran in 1828. In 2024, Torkamanchay District (Note: Renamed the Central District of Torkamanchay County) was separated from Mianeh County in the establishment of Torkamanchay County and renamed the Central District. The new county was divided into two districts and five rural districts, with Torkamanchay as its capital and only city at the time.

== Demographics ==
=== Administrative divisions ===
Torkamanchay County's administrative structure is shown in the following table.

Torkamanchay County
Administrative Divisions
Central District (Note: Formerly Torkamanchay District of Mianeh County)
Barvanan-e Gharbi RD
Barvanan-e Markazi RD
Owch Tappeh-ye Gharbi RD
Torkamanchay (city)
Sowmaeh District
Barvanan-e Sharqi RD
Gavineh Rud RD
RD = Rural District
