= Central District (Torkamanchay County) =

District in East Azerbaijan province, Iran

Central District (Torkamanchay County) Persian: بخش مرکزی شهرستان ترکمانچای
- District
- Location within Iran
- Coordinates: 37°32′N 47°21′E
- Country: Iran
- Province: East Azerbaijan
- County: Torkamanchay
- Capital: Torkamanchay

Population (2016)
  - Total: 21,387 (Note: As Torkamanchay District of Mianeh County)
- Time zone: UTC+3:30 (IRST)

The Central District of Torkamanchay County (Persian: بخش مرکزی شهرستان ترکمانچای) (Note: Formerly Torkamanchay District (بخش ترکمانچای) of Mianeh County) is in East Azerbaijan province, Iran. Its capital is the city of Torkamanchay.

== History ==
In 2024, Torkamanchay District (Note: Renamed the Central District of Torkamanchay County) was separated from Mianeh County in the establishment of Torkamanchay County and renamed the Central District. The new county was divided into two districts and five rural districts, with Torkamanchay as its capital and only city at the time.

== Demographics ==
=== Population ===
At the time of the 2006 National Census, the district's population (as Torkamanchay District of Mianeh County) was 25,281 in 5,935 households. The following census in 2011 counted 22,724 people in 6,415 households. The 2016 census measured the population of the district as 21,387 inhabitants in 7,058 households.

=== Administrative divisions ===
Central District (Torkamanchay County) (Note: As Torkamanchay District of Mianeh County at the 2006, 2011, and 2016 censuses)
Administrative Divisions	2006	2011	2016
Barvanan-e Gharbi RD	5,679	4,472	4,132
Barvanan-e Markazi RD	2,174	1,606	1,721
Barvanan-e Sharqi RD (Note: Transferred to Sowmaeh District after the 2016 census)	8,304	7,400	6,356
Owch Tappeh-ye Gharbi RD	2,690	2,152	1,735
Torkamanchay (city)	6,434	7,094	7,443
Total	25,281	22,724	21,387
RD = Rural District
