= Deller =

There are several people with the surname Deller:

- Adam Deller, Australian astrophysicist
- Alfred Deller (1912–1979), English countertenor
- Harris Deller (born 1947), American ceramics artist
- Jeremy Deller (born 1966), English artist
- Keith Deller (born 1959), English professional darts player
- Mark Deller, (born 1938), English countertenor, son of Alfred Deller
- Martin Deller, Canadian musician
- Reginald Deller (1933–2001), English cricketer
- Roy Deller (1913–1988), Australian rules footballer
- William "Bill" Deller (born 1943), Australian rules football field umpire

Dəlilər or Dalliar or Dallyar or Dälilär or Dolyar or Dəllər may also refer to:

- Dəllər Cəyir, Azerbaijan
- Dəllər Cırdaxan, Azerbaijan
- Dəlilər, Agsu, Azerbaijan
- Dəlilər, Saatly, Azerbaijan
- Dəllər, Shamkir, Azerbaijan
- Dalilar, Iran
- Deliler, Çorum, Turkey
- Deliler, Osmancık, Turkey

== See also ==
- Dəlilər (disambiguation)
