= Hir (disambiguation) =

Hir is a gender-neutral pronoun used in place of him/her or his/her.

Hir or HIR may also refer to:

== Places ==
- Hir, Iran, a city in Ardabil Province, Iran
- Hir District, a district in Ardabil Province, Iran
- Hir Rural District, a rural district in Ardabil Province, Iran
- Hir, Qazvin, a village in Qazvin Province, Iran
- Hir, Sistan and Baluchestan, a village in Sistan and Baluchestan Province, Iran

== People ==
- Hir Vijay Suri (17th century), Indian Jain
- Ieuan Brydydd Hir (1450–1485), Welsh language poet
- Rhun ap Maelgwn, or Rhun Hir (died c. 586), king of Gwynedd

== Transport ==
- Harinagar railway station (Indian Railways station code), Bihar, India
- Honiara International Airport (IATA code), Solomon Islands
- Horton-in-Ribblesdale railway station (National Rail station code), North Yorkshire, England

== Other uses ==
- Harvard International Review, a quarterly journal on international affairs
- Halogen Infrared Reflective, a type of lightbulb
- Humoral immunity (Humoral Immune Response)

== See also ==
- Her (disambiguation)
- Hur (disambiguation)
- Le Hir
- Ynys-hir
