= Zanjilabad =

Zanjilabad زنجيل اباد
- Village
- Location within Iran
- Coordinates: 38°01′38″N 47°08′21″E
- Country: Iran
- Province: East Azerbaijan
- County: Sarab
- Bakhsh: Mehraban
- Rural District: Ardalan

Population (2006)
  - Total: 122
- Time zone: UTC+3:30 (IRST)
  - Summer (DST): UTC+4:30 (IRDT)

Zanjilabad (Persian: زنجيل اباد, also Romanized as Zanjīlābād; also known as Zanjolābād) is a village in Ardalan Rural District, Mehraban District, Sarab County, East Azerbaijan Province, Iran. At the 2006 census, its population was 122 with 43 families.
