= Lanjevan =

Lanjevan لنجوان
- Village
- Location within Iran
- Coordinates: 37°50′34″N 47°02′10″E
- Country: Iran
- Province: East Azerbaijan
- County: Sarab
- Bakhsh: Mehraban
- Rural District: Sharabian

Population (2006)
  - Total: 26
- Time zone: UTC+3:30 (IRST)
  - Summer (DST): UTC+4:30 (IRDT)

Lanjevan (Persian: لنجوان, also Romanized as Lanjevān, Lanjavān, and Lenjovān) is a village in Sharabian Rural District, Mehraban District, Sarab County, East Azerbaijan Province, Iran. At the 2006 census, its population was 26, in 7 families.
