= Ajirabad =

Ajirabad اجيراباد
- Village
- Location within Iran
- Coordinates: 38°01′18″N 47°17′47″E
- Country: Iran
- Province: East Azerbaijan
- County: Sarab
- Bakhsh: Mehraban
- Rural District: Ardalan

Population (2006)
  - Total: 138
- Time zone: UTC+3:30 (IRST)
  - Summer (DST): UTC+4:30 (IRDT)

Ajirabad (Persian: اجيراباد, also Romanized as Ajīrābād; also known as Ajrābād and Jīrābād) is a village in Ardalan Rural District, Mehraban District, Sarab County, East Azerbaijan Province, Iran. At the 2006 census, its population was 138, in 27 families.
