= Dehdulan =

Dehdulan دهدولان
- Village
- Location within Iran
- Coordinates: 37°49′33″N 47°07′30″E
- Country: Iran
- Province: East Azerbaijan
- County: Sarab
- Bakhsh: Mehraban
- Rural District: Sharabian

Population (2006)
  - Total: 150
- Time zone: UTC+3:30 (IRST)
  - Summer (DST): UTC+4:30 (IRDT)

Dehdulan (Persian: دهدولان, also Romanized as Dehdūlān; also known as Dehdolān) is a village in Sharabian Rural District, Mehraban District, Sarab County, East Azerbaijan Province, Iran. At the 2006 census, its population was 150, in 32 families.
