= Ardalan (disambiguation) =

Ardalan was a vassaldom in Persia.

Ardalan (Persian: اردلان) may also refer to:

== Places ==
- Ardalan, East Azerbaijan
- Ardalan, Qazvin
- Ardalan, Razavi Khorasan
- Ardalan Rural District, in East Azerbaijan Province

== Persons ==
=== Given name ===
- Ardalan Afshar (born 1984), Austrian rapper of Iranian descent better known as Nazar
- Ardalan Ashtiani (born 1982), Iranian football player
- Ardalan Esmaili (born 1986), Iranian-born Swedish actor
- Ardalan Shekarabi (born 1978), Swedish politician of Iranian descent
- Ardalan Shoja Kaveh (born 1963), Iranian actor

=== Surname ===
- Aligholi Ardalan (1900–1986), Iranian diplomat
- Davar Ardalan (born 1964), American-Iranian radio producer
- Farhad Ardalan (born 1939), Iranian physicist
- Mastoureh Ardalan (1805–1848), Kurdish poet and writer
- Niloufar Ardalan (born 1985), Iranian football player
- Parvin Ardalan (born 1967), Iranian women's rights activist, writer and journalist
