= Mirza Ibrahimov =

Soviet Azerbaijani writer and politician (1911–1993)

- Mirzə İbrahimov
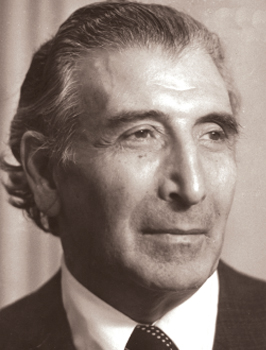
- Born: 28 October 1911; Eyvaq, Sarab East Azarbaijan iran
- Died: 17 December 1993 (aged 82); Baku, Azerbaijan
- Resting place: Alley of Honor, Baku
- Writing career
- Language: Azerbaijani
- Years active: 1930–1993

Mirza Ibrahimov (Azerbaijani: Mirzə İbrahimov, Arabic:: میرزا ابراهیموف; 28 October 1911 – 17 December 1993) was a Soviet Azerbaijani writer and politician.

== Biography ==
Mirza Ibrahimov was born on 28 October 1911 in the village of Eyvaq near the city of Sarab, located in present-day Sharabian Rural District, in Iran's East Azerbaijan province. In 1918, he migrated to Baku with his father and elder brother. Following the deaths of his mother and subsequently his father, he began working as a laborer in the villages of Balakhani and Zabrat at a young age to support himself. After the establishment of Soviet rule in Azerbaijan, he studied and worked at the Balakhani Factory-Plant School from 1926 to 1930. His literary activity began through his involvement in the workers' literary circle in Zabrat, which marked the starting point of his engagement with creative writing.

== Literary and public career ==
Mirza Ibrahimov's first published poem, Qazılan buruq (The Drilled Well), appeared in 1930 in the anthology Aprel alovları (April Flames). He continued publishing poems in periodicals and began writing critical essays, short stories, and journalistic pieces in the 1930s. In 1932, he visited the Donbas coal mines and Dnipropetrovsk industrial centers in Ukraine to study large-scale construction under the Five-Year Plans, later publishing the essay collection Giqantlar ölkəsində (In the Land of Giants). After completing studies at the preparatory division of the Azerbaijan State Scientific Research Institute, he was appointed in 1933 to the political department of the Nakhchivan Machine-Tractor Station as editor of the newspaper Sürət. His first play, Həyat (Life), was written during this time.

From 1935 to 1937, he studied at the Leningrad-based Institute of Oriental Studies of the USSR Academy of Sciences, where he defended a dissertation on Jalil Mammadguluzadeh. In 1945, at age 34, he became one of the first elected full members of the newly established Azerbaijan Academy of Sciences and was actively engaged in research throughout his life. In 1942, he was appointed People's Commissar of Education of the Azerbaijan SSR and later served as Minister of Education (1942–1946), Director of the State Opera and Ballet Theater, and Head of the Art Affairs Department under the Council of People's Commissars.

During World War II, he contributed to wartime propaganda through his writings and speeches in factories, rural areas, and military units. While in Southern Azerbaijan in 1941, he served as editor of the newspaper Vətən yolunda (On the Path of the Homeland), and in 1942 participated in meetings with soldiers of the 416th Division in the Russian Far East.

He authored numerous stories and novellas centered on Southern Azerbaijan, such as Zəhra, Mələk, Qaçaq, Xosrov Ruzbeh, and Pərvizin həyatı, as well as novels including Gələcək gün (1948), Böyük dayaq (1957), and Pərvanə. His plays include Madrid (1937), Məhəbbət (1941), and after a two-decade hiatus, Kəndçi qızı (The Peasant Girl, 1961) — awarded the Mirza Fatali Akhundov Prize — Yaxşı adam (A Good Man, 1963), and Közərən ocaqlar (Smoldering Fires, 1967), which focused on Nariman Narimanov.

Ibrahimov translated major theatrical works into Azerbaijani, including Shakespeare's King Lear and Twelfth Night, Ostrovsky's Mad Money, Chekhov's Three Sisters, and Molière's Dom Juan.

He played a major role in shaping national philological scholarship and advancing the status of the Azerbaijani language. His efforts culminated in the 1956 constitutional amendment recognizing Azerbaijani as a state language. His article Azərbaycan dili dövlət idarələrində ("The Azerbaijani Language in State Institutions") emphasized the significance of the national question.

He held numerous leadership roles: Chairman (1948–1954) and First Secretary (1965–1976) of the Azerbaijani Writers' Union, Secretary of the USSR Writers' Union Board (1965–1976), Deputy Chairman of the Council of Ministers of the Azerbaijan SSR (1947–1950), and Chairman of the Presidium of the Supreme Soviet of the Azerbaijan SSR (1954–1958). He participated in international congresses in Helsinki, Bangkok, Stockholm, and represented the USSR at UN committees, including the anti-apartheid session in New York (1978). From 1977, he chaired the Soviet Solidarity Committee with Asian and African countries, leading delegations to the U.S., U.K., France, Egypt, and other nations.

As Director of the Nizami Institute of Literature of the Azerbaijan Academy of Sciences, he oversaw the development of modern linguistic and literary research and contributed significantly to the three-volume History of Azerbaijani Literature (1946–1954). He later headed the department of 19th-century Azerbaijani literature (1960–1970) and remained active in literary scholarship into the 1990s. His works were translated into the languages of many Soviet peoples and beyond. He was awarded the Order of Lenin three times, the Order of the October Revolution, and numerous other honors.

Until the end of his life, he headed the Southern Azerbaijani Literature Department at the Nizami Institute. Ibrahimov died on 17 December 1993, in Baku and was buried in the Alley of Honor.

== Awards and honors ==
- Hero of Socialist Labour (14 October 1981)
- People's Writer of the Azerbaijan SSR (9 October 1961)
- Honored Art Worker of the Azerbaijan SSR (17 June 1943)
- Stalin Prize, 2nd class (14 March 1951), for the novel Gələcək gün ("The Coming Day," 1948)
- Azerbaijan SSR State Prize named after Mirza Fatali Akhundov (28 April 1965), for the comedy Kəndçi qızı ("The Peasant Girl")
- Order of Lenin (three times: 25 February 1946; 28 October 1967; 14 October 1981)
- Order of the October Revolution (21 October 1971)
- Order of the Red Banner of Labour (17 April 1938)
- International Nehru Award (1979)

== Legacy ==
On 5 February 1996, a presidential decree was issued in the Republic of Azerbaijan to commemorate the memory of Mirza Ibrahimov, a prominent writer and public figure, and to honor his contributions to national culture and literature.

== Works ==
- İbrahimov, Mirzə (1932). Giqantlar ölkəsi. Bakı: Azərnəşr. p. 32.
- İbrahimov, Mirzə (1934). Həyat üçün. Bakı: Azərnəşr. p. 115.
- İbrahimov, Mirzə (1937). Həyat (pyes). Bakı: Azərnəşr. p. 107.
- İbrahimov, Mirzə (1938). Həyat (pyes). Bakı: Azərnəşr. p. 110.
- İbrahimov, Mirzə (1939). Böyük demokrat (Molla Nəsrəddin). Bakı: Azərnəşr. p. 160.
- İbrahimov, Mirzə (1947). Həyat və ədəbiyyat. Bakı: Azərnəşr. p. 213.
- İbrahimov, Mirzə (1949). Azad. Bakı: Uşaqgəncnəşr. p. 20.
- İbrahimov, Mirzə (1949). Gələcək üçün. Bakı: Azərnəşr. p. 157.
- İbrahimov, Mirzə (1949). Gələcək gün (Roman). Bakı: Azərnəşr. p. 753.
- İbrahimov, Mirzə (1950). Salam sənə Rusiya!. Bakı: Azərnəşr. p. 87.
- İbrahimov, Mirzə (1954). Seçilmiş əsərləri. I cild. Bakı: Azərnəşr. p. 406.
- İbrahimov, Mirzə (1957). Azərbaycan dili (məqalələr). Bakı: Azərbaycan SSR EA Nəşriyyatı. p. 74.
- İbrahimov, Mirzə (1957). Böyük dayaq (Roman). Bakı: Uşaqgəncnəşr. p. 582.
- İbrahimov, Mirzə (1958). Sarı sim (Xatirələr, məqalələr, oçerklər). Bakı: Azərnəşr. p. 301.
- İbrahimov, Mirzə (1961). Mədinənin ürəyi (Hekayələr). Bakı: Uşaqgəncnəşr. p. 213.
- İbrahimov, Mirzə (1961). Xəlqilik və realizm cəbhəsindən. Bakı: Azərnəşr. p. 524.
- İbrahimov, Mirzə (1962). Böyük şairimiz Sabir. Bakı: Azərb. SSR EA Nəşriyyatı. p. 38.
- İbrahimov, Mirzə (1964). Murovdağın ətəyində. Bakı: Azərnəşr. p. 93.
- İbrahimov, Mirzə (1970). Ədəbi qeydlər. Bakı: Azərnəşr. p. 299.
- İbrahimov, Mirzə (1971). Pərvanə (Roman). Bakı: Azərnəşr. p. 703.
- İbrahimov, Mirzə (1975). Pərvizin həyatı (Hekayə və povestlər). Bakı: Yazıçı. p. 248.
- İbrahimov, Mirzə (1978–1983). Əsərləri. I–X cildlər. Bakı: Yazıçı.
- İbrahimov, Mirzə (1986). Anama deyərəm ha!. Bakı: Gənclik. p. 336.
- İbrahimov, Mirzə. Tufanlara kömək edən bir qələm. Bakı: Azərnəşr. p. 197.

=== Translations ===
- Chernyshevsky, Nikolay (1956). What Is to Be Done? (A Novel About New People) (in Azerbaijani). Translated by Mirza Ibrahimov. Baku: Uşaqgəncnəşr. p. 180.
- Chernyshevsky, Nikolay (1974). What Is to Be Done? (Conversations About New People, Novel) (in Azerbaijani). Translated by Mirza Ibrahimov. Baku: Gənclik. p. 536.
- Rashidov, Sharaf (1976). The Victors (in Azerbaijani). Translated by Mirza Ibrahimov. Baku: Azərnəşr. p. 378.

=== About Ibrahimov ===
- Quliyev, E. M. (1997). Ibrahimov: Literary-Aesthetic Views and Issues of Artistic Craft (in Azerbaijani). Baku: Azerbaijan State Pedagogical University (ADPU). p. 96.
- Anar (2 February 1994). "The Last Journey of a Lonely Teacher". Azərbaycan (in Azerbaijani).
- "Decree of the President of the Republic of Azerbaijan on the Commemoration of Mirza Ibrahimov". Azərbaycan (in Azerbaijani). 6 February 1996.
- Rahimqızı, S. (16 January 2002). "The Joy of a Meeting". Xalq qəzeti (in Azerbaijani).

== Literature ==
- Əhmədov, H (2014). Azərbaycan məktəb və pedaqoji fikir tarixi [History of Azerbaijani Schools and Pedagogical Thought] (in Azerbaijani). Baku: Elm və təhsil.
- Guliyev, J. B., ed. (1980). "Mirza İbrahimov". Azerbaijan Soviet Encyclopedia (in Azerbaijani). Vol. IV. Baku: Azerbaijan Soviet Encyclopedia Main Editorial Office. p. 361.
