= Narmiq, Mehraban =

Narmiq نرميق
- Village
- Location within Iran
- Coordinates: 38°10′43″N 47°20′04″E
- Country: Iran
- Province: East Azerbaijan
- County: Sarab
- Bakhsh: Mehraban
- Rural District: Alan Baraghush

Population (2006)
  - Total: 79
- Time zone: UTC+3:30 (IRST)
  - Summer (DST): UTC+4:30 (IRDT)

For the village in the Sarab district see Narmiq, Sarab

Narmiq (Persian: نرميق, also Romanized as Narmīq) is a village in Alan Baraghush Rural District, Mehraban District, Sarab County, East Azerbaijan Province, Iran. At the 2006 census, its population was 79, in 18 families.
