= Sar Cheshmeh, East Azerbaijan =

Sar Cheshmeh سرچشمه
- Village
- Location within Iran
- Coordinates: 37°52′32″N 47°03′03″E
- Country: Iran
- Province: East Azerbaijan
- County: Sarab
- Bakhsh: Mehraban
- Rural District: Sharabian

Population (2006)
  - Total: 338
- Time zone: UTC+3:30 (IRST)
  - Summer (DST): UTC+4:30 (IRDT)

Sar Cheshmeh (Persian: سرچشمه, also Romanized as Sarchashmah and Sar Chashmeh) is a village in Sharabian Rural District, Mehraban District, Sarab County, East Azerbaijan Province, Iran. At the 2006 census, its population was 338, in 77 families.
