= Rajolabad =

Rajolabad رجل اباد
- Village
- Location within Iran
- Coordinates: 38°02′43″N 47°06′03″E
- Country: Iran
- Province: East Azerbaijan
- County: Sarab
- Bakhsh: Mehraban
- Rural District: Ardalan

Population (2006)
  - Total: 109
- Time zone: UTC+3:30 (IRST)
  - Summer (DST): UTC+4:30 (IRDT)

Rajolabad (Persian: رجل اباد, also Romanized as Rajolābād) is a village in Ardalan Rural District, Mehraban District, Sarab County, East Azerbaijan Province, Iran. At the 2006 census, its population was 109, in 31 families.
