= Dəlilər =

Dəlilər, or Dalilar or Dalular, may refer to:

- Dəlilər, Agsu, Azerbaijan
- Dəlilər, Saatly, Azerbaijan
- Dəlilər, Shamkir, Azerbaijan
- Dalilar, Iran
- Dalular, Ararat Province, Armenia

== See also ==
- Deller (disambiguation)
