= Deylamshah =

Deylamshah ديلم شاه
- Village
- Location within Iran
- Coordinates: 38°08′37″N 47°21′17″E
- Country: Iran
- Province: East Azerbaijan
- County: Sarab
- Bakhsh: Mehraban
- Rural District: Alan Baraghush

Population (2006)
  - Total: 80
- Time zone: UTC+3:30 (IRST)
  - Summer (DST): UTC+4:30 (IRDT)

Deylamshah (Persian: ديلم شاه, also Romanized as Deylamshāh) is a village in Alan Baraghush Rural District, Mehraban District, Sarab County, East Azerbaijan Province, Iran. At the 2006 census, its population was 80, in 17 families.
