= Kehdolan =

Kehdolan كهدلان
- Village
- Location within Iran
- Coordinates: 37°49′12″N 47°08′12″E
- Country: Iran
- Province: East Azerbaijan
- County: Sarab
- Bakhsh: Mehraban
- Rural District: Sharabian

Population (2006)
  - Total: 397
- Time zone: UTC+3:30 (IRST)
  - Summer (DST): UTC+4:30 (IRDT)

Kehdolan (Persian: كهدلان, also Romanized as Kehdolān) is a village in Sharabian Rural District, Mehraban District, Sarab County, East Azerbaijan Province, Iran. At the 2006 census, its population was 397, in 63 families.
