= Aralluy =

Aralluy (Persian: ارالوي), also rendered as Arallu, may refer to:

- Aralluy-e Bozorg, "Greater Aralluy", a village in Ardabil Province, Iran
- Aralluy-e Kuchek, "Lesser Aralluy", a village in Ardabil Province, Iran
