= Razgah, East Azerbaijan =

Razgah رزگاه
- Village
- Location within Iran
- Coordinates: 38°03′26″N 47°20′55″E
- Country: Iran
- Province: East Azerbaijan
- County: Sarab
- Bakhsh: Mehraban
- Rural District: Alan Baraghush

Population (2006)
  - Total: 164
- Time zone: UTC+3:30 (IRST)
  - Summer (DST): UTC+4:30 (IRDT)

Razgah (Persian: رزگاه, also Romanized as Razgāh and Rāzgāh) is a village in Alan Baraghush Rural District, Mehraban District, Sarab County, East Azerbaijan Province, Iran. At the 2006 census, its population was 164, in 39 families. One of the bigger Nepheline syenite mines are in this village.
