= Atmeyan-e Sofla =

Atmeyan-e Sofla اتميان سفلي
- Village
- Location within Iran
- Coordinates: 38°09′15″N 47°16′50″E
- Country: Iran
- Province: East Azerbaijan
- County: Sarab
- Bakhsh: Mehraban
- Rural District: Alan Baraghush

Population (2006)
  - Total: 53
- Time zone: UTC+3:30 (IRST)
  - Summer (DST): UTC+4:30 (IRDT)

Atmeyan-e Sofla (Persian: اتميان سفلي, also Romanized as Ātmeyān-e Soflá; also known as Ātmeyān-e Pā'īn) is a village in Alan Baraghush Rural District, Mehraban District, Sarab County, East Azerbaijan Province, Iran. At the 2006 census, its population was 53, in 11 families.
