= Baraghush =

Village in East Azerbaijan province, Iran

Baraghush Persian: براغوش
- Village
- Location within Iran
- Coordinates: 38°05′41″N 47°13′30″E
- Country: Iran
- Province: East Azerbaijan
- County: Sarab
- District: Mehraban
- Rural District: Alan Baraghush

Population (2016)
  - Total: 675
- Time zone: UTC+3:30 (IRST)

Baraghush (Persian: براغوش) (Note: Also romanized as Barāghūsh; also known as Barāqūsh) is a village in Alan Baraghush Rural District of Mehraban District in Sarab County, East Azerbaijan province, Iran.

== Demographics ==
=== Population ===
At the time of the 2006 National Census, the village's population was 974 in 242 households. The following census in 2011 counted 871 people in 232 households. The 2016 census measured the population of the village as 675 people in 210 households.
