= Razgah =

Razgah (Persian: رزگاه or رازگاه) may refer to:

- Razgah, Ardabil (رزگاه - Razgāh)
- Razgah, East Azerbaijan (رزگاه - Razgāh)
- Razgah, West Azerbaijan (رازگاه - Rāzgāh)

== See also ==
- Rezgah (disambiguation)
