= Khaki, East Azerbaijan =

Village in East Azerbaijan province, Iran

Khaki Persian: خاكي
- Village
- Location within Iran
- Coordinates: 37°58′28″N 47°04′42″E
- Country: Iran
- Province: East Azerbaijan
- County: Sarab
- District: Mehraban
- Rural District: Sharabian

Population (2016)
  - Total: 1,465
- Time zone: UTC+3:30 (IRST)

Khaki (Persian: خاكي) (Note: Also romanized as Khākī) is a village in Sharabian Rural District of Mehraban District in Sarab County, East Azerbaijan province, Iran.

== Demographics ==
=== Population ===
At the time of the 2006 National Census, the village's population was 1,355 in 366 households. The following census in 2011 counted 1,434 people in 438 households. The 2016 census measured the population of the village as 1,465 people in 456 households. It was the most populous village in its rural district.
