= Siah Dowlan, Sarab =

Siah Dowlan سيه دولان
- Village
- Location within Iran
- Coordinates: 38°05′54″N 47°22′21″E
- Country: Iran
- Province: East Azerbaijan
- County: Sarab
- Bakhsh: Mehraban
- Rural District: Alan Baraghush

Population (2006)
  - Total: 179
- Time zone: UTC+3:30 (IRST)
  - Summer (DST): UTC+4:30 (IRDT)

Siah Dowlan (Persian: سيه دولان, also Romanized as Sīāh Dowlān) is a village in Alan Baraghush Rural District, Mehraban District, Sarab County, East Azerbaijan Province, Iran. At the 2006 census, its population was 179, in 33 families.
