= Shad Baghi =

Shad Baghi (Persian: شادباغي) may refer to:

- Shad Baghi, East Azerbaijan
- Shad Baghi, Markazi
