= Gollujeh, Sarab =

Gollujeh گلوجه
- Village
- Location within Iran
- Coordinates: 38°00′58″N 47°20′38″E
- Country: Iran
- Province: East Azerbaijan
- County: Sarab
- Bakhsh: Mehraban
- Rural District: Alan Baraghush

Population (2006)
  - Total: 80
- Time zone: UTC+3:30 (IRST)
  - Summer (DST): UTC+4:30 (IRDT)

Gollujeh (Persian: گلوجه, also Romanized as Gollūjeh; also known as Koljeh) is a village in Alan Baraghush Rural District, Mehraban District, Sarab County, East Azerbaijan Province, Iran. At the 2006 census, its population was 80, in 20 families.
