= Jamalabad, Sarab =

Village in East Azerbaijan province, Iran

Jamalabad Persian: جمال اباد
- Village
- Location within Iran
- Coordinates: 38°08′15″N 47°07′08″E
- Country: Iran
- Province: East Azerbaijan
- County: Sarab
- District: Mehraban
- Rural District: Alan Baraghush

Population (2016)
  - Total: 368
- Time zone: UTC+3:30 (IRST)

Jamalabad (Persian: جمال اباد) (Note: Also romanized as Jamālābād and Jemālābād) is a village in Alan Baraghush Rural District of Mehraban District in Sarab County, East Azerbaijan province, Iran.

== Demographics ==
=== Population ===
At the time of the 2006 National Census, the village's population was 411 in 115 households. The following census in 2011 counted 437 people in 114 households. The 2016 census measured the population of the village as 368 people in 110 households.
