= Atmeyan =

Atmeyan or At Meyan or Atmian or Atmiyan (Persian: اتميان) may refer to:

- Atmeyan, Ahar
- Atmeyan-e Sofla, Sarab County
- Atmeyan-e Vosta, Sarab County
