= Damirchi, Sarab =

Village in East Azerbaijan province, Iran

Damirchi Persian: دميرچي
- Village
- Location within Iran
- Coordinates: 38°07′27″N 47°22′25″E
- Country: Iran
- Province: East Azerbaijan
- County: Sarab
- District: Mehraban
- Rural District: Alan Baraghush

Population (2016)
  - Total: 294
- Time zone: UTC+3:30 (IRST)

Damirchi (Persian: دميرچي) (Note: Also romanized as Damīrchī) is a village in Alan Baraghush Rural District of Mehraban District in Sarab County, East Azerbaijan province, Iran.

== Demographics ==
=== Population ===
At the time of the 2006 National Census, the village's population was 429 in 82 households. The following census in 2011 counted 414 people in 99 households. The 2016 census measured the population of the village as 294 people in 81 households.
