= Alan, East Azerbaijan =

Village in East Azerbaijan province, Iran

Alan Persian: الان
- Village
- Location within Iran
- Coordinates: 38°05′34″N 47°15′50″E
- Country: Iran
- Province: East Azerbaijan
- County: Sarab
- District: Mehraban
- Rural District: Alan Baraghush

Population (2016)
  - Total: 1,759
- Time zone: UTC+3:30 (IRST)

Alan (Persian: الان) (Note: Also Romanized as Ālān) is a village in, and the capital of, Alan Baraghush Rural District in Mehraban District of Sarab County, East Azerbaijan province, Iran. The village is on the Aji Chay River.

== Demographics ==
=== Population ===
At the time of the 2006 National Census, the village's population was 2,373 in 533 households. The following census in 2011 counted 2,203 people in 589 households. The 2016 census measured the population of the village as 1,759 people in 494 households. It was the most populous village in its rural district.
