= Sheykh Serjin =

Sheykh Serjin شيخ سرجين
- Village
- Location within Iran
- Coordinates: 37°51′10″N 47°45′31″E
- Country: Iran
- Province: East Azerbaijan
- County: Sarab
- Bakhsh: Central
- Rural District: Molla Yaqub

Population (2006)
  - Total: 216
- Time zone: UTC+3:30 (IRST)
  - Summer (DST): UTC+4:30 (IRDT)

Sheykh Serjin (Persian: شيخ سرجين, also Romanized as Sheykh Serjīn) is a village in Molla Yaqub Rural District, in the Central District of Sarab County, East Azerbaijan Province, Iran. As of the 2006 census, its population was 216, in 38 families.
