= Shah Baghi =

Shah Baghi (Persian: شاه باغي) may refer to:

- Shah Baghi, East Azerbaijan
- Shah Baghi, Markazi
