= Rezgah =

Rezgah or Rez Gah or Razgeh (Persian: رزگه) may refer to:

- Razgeh, Chaharmahal and Bakhtiari
- Rez Gah, Khuzestan
- Rezgah, Lorestan
- Razgeh, West Azerbaijan

== See also ==
- Razgah (disambiguation)
