= Kivaj =

Village in East Azerbaijan province, Iran

Kivaj Persian: كيوج
- Village
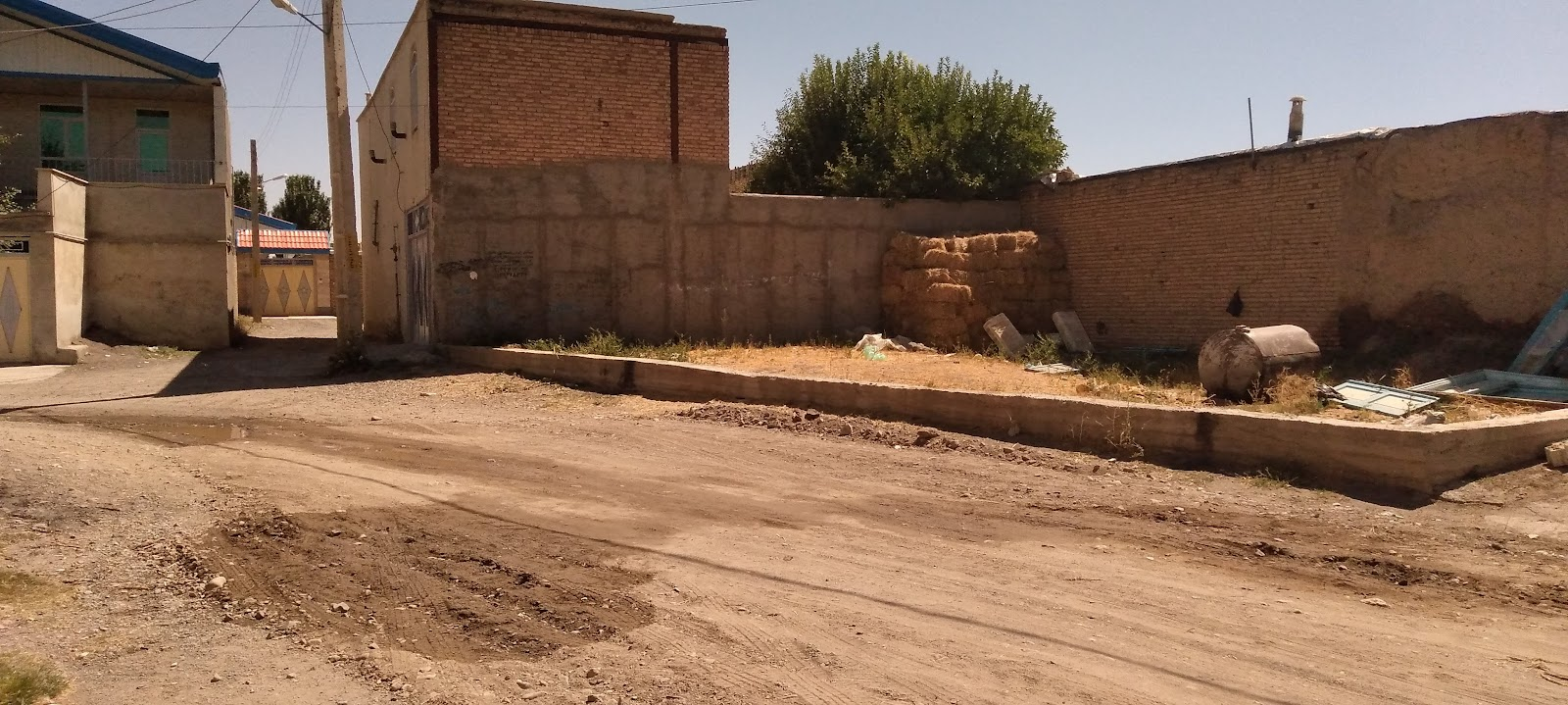
- The village of Kivaj

- Location within Iran
- Coordinates: 38°04′03″N 47°05′23″E
- Country: Iran
- Province: East Azerbaijan
- County: Sarab
- District: Mehraban
- Rural District: Ardalan

Population (2016)
  - Total: 327
- Time zone: UTC+3:30 (IRST)

Kivaj (Persian: كيوج) (Note: Also romanized as Kīvaj; also known as Gīvaj, Kavā, Kovā, and Kuva) is a village in Ardalan Rural District of Mehraban District in Sarab County, East Azerbaijan province, Iran.

== Demographics ==
=== Population ===
At the time of the 2006 National Census, the village's population was 326 in 93 households. The following census in 2011 counted 324 people in 90 households. The 2016 census measured the population of the village as 327 people in 100 households.
