= Sowmaeh Zarrin, Mehraban =

Village in East Azerbaijan province, Iran

Sowmaeh Zarrin Persian: صومعه زرين
- Village
- Location within Iran
- Coordinates: 38°06′09″N 47°19′02″E
- Country: Iran
- Province: East Azerbaijan
- County: Sarab
- District: Mehraban
- Rural District: Alan Baraghush

Population (2016)
  - Total: 368
- Time zone: UTC+3:30 (IRST)

Sowmaeh Zarrin (Persian: صومعه زرين) (Note: Also romanized as Şowma‘eh Zarrīn; also known as Şowma‘eh, Sowme‘eh, Suma, and Summa) is a village in Alan Baraghush Rural District of Mehraban District in Sarab County, East Azerbaijan province, Iran.

== Demographics ==
=== Population ===
At the time of the 2006 National Census, the village's population was 444 in 112 households. The following census in 2011 counted 494 people in 123 households. The 2016 census measured the population of the village as 368 people in 112 households.
