= Narmiq =

Narmiq (Persian: نرميق) may refer to:

- Narmiq, Sarab
- Narmiq, Mehraban, Sarab County
