= Dijan =

Village in East Azerbaijan province, Iran

Dijan Persian: دي جان
- Village
- Location within Iran
- Coordinates: 38°03′39″N 47°19′06″E
- Country: Iran
- Province: East Azerbaijan
- County: Sarab
- District: Mehraban
- Rural District: Alan Baraghush

Population (2016)
  - Total: 296
- Time zone: UTC+3:30 (IRST)

Dijan (Persian: دي جان) (Note: Also romanized as Dījān; also known as Bīchān and Dīchān) is a village in Alan Baraghush Rural District of Mehraban District in Sarab County, East Azerbaijan province, Iran.

== Demographics ==
=== Population ===
At the time of the 2006 National Census, the village's population was 412 in 97 households. The following census in 2011 counted 405 people in 87 households. The 2016 census measured the population of the village as 296 people in 67 households.
