= Yaychi =

Yaychi (Persian: يايچي) may refer to:

- Yaychi, Ardabil
- Yaychi, East Azerbaijan
- Yaychi, West Azerbaijan
