= Qeysaraq =

Village in East Azerbaijan province, Iran

Qeysaraq Persian: قيصرق
- Village
- Location within Iran
- Coordinates: 38°03′51″N 47°13′46″E
- Country: Iran
- Province: East Azerbaijan
- County: Sarab
- District: Mehraban
- Rural District: Ardalan

Population (2016)
  - Total: 2,155
- Time zone: UTC+3:30 (IRST)

Qeysaraq (Persian: قيصرق) (Note: Also romanized as Qeyşaraq; also known as Qeyşarīyeh (قيصريه)) is a village in Ardalan Rural District of Mehraban District in Sarab County, East Azerbaijan province, Iran. The village is in the Aji Chay valley.

== Demographics ==
=== Population ===
At the time of the 2006 National Census, the village's population was 2,273 in 539 households. The following census in 2011 counted 2,260 people in 641 households. The 2016 census measured the population of the village as 2,155 people in 700 households. It was the most populous village in its rural district.
