= Atmeyan-e Vosta =

Atmeyan-e Vosta اتمیان وسطی
- Village
- Location within Iran
- Coordinates: 38°10′07″N 47°17′05″E
- Country: Iran
- Province: East Azerbaijan
- County: Sarab
- Bakhsh: Mehraban
- Rural District: Alan Baraghush

Population (2006)
  - Total: 35
- Time zone: UTC+3:30 (IRST)
  - Summer (DST): UTC+4:30 (IRDT)

Atmeyan-e Vosta (Persian: اتمیان وسطی, also Romanized as Ātmeyān-e Vosţá; also known as Ātmeyān, Ātmeyān-e Vasaţ, Ātmīān, and Ātmīyān) is a village in Alan Baraghush Rural District, Mehraban District, Sarab County, East Azerbaijan Province, Iran. At the 2006 census, its population was 35, in 9 families.
