= Berenjabad =

Berenjabad (Persian: برنج اباد) may refer to:

- Berenjabad, East Azerbaijan
- Berenjabad, West Azerbaijan
