= Hasanjan =

Village in East Azerbaijan, Iran

Hasanjan حسنجان
- Village
- Location within Iran
- Coordinates: 37°51′48″N 47°39′59″E
- Country: Iran
- Province: East Azerbaijan
- County: Sarab
- Bakhsh: Central
- Rural District: Molla Yaqub

Population (2006)
  - Total: 319
- Time zone: UTC+3:30 (IRST)
  - Summer (DST): UTC+4:30 (IRDT)

Hasanjan (Persian: حسنجان, also Romanized as Ḩasanjān) is a village in Molla Yaqub Rural District, in the Central District of Sarab County, East Azerbaijan Province, Iran. At the 2006 census, its population was 319, in 65 families.
