= Seyah Dowlan =

Seyah Dowlan or Siah Dowlan or Seyah Dulan (Persian: سيه دولان) may refer to:

- Seyah Dowlan, Ahar
- Siah Dowlan, Sarab
