= Arzanaq, East Azerbaijan =

Village in East Azerbaijan province, Iran

Arzanaq Persian: ارزنق
- Village
- Location within Iran
- Coordinates: 37°59′29″N 47°13′02″E
- Country: Iran
- Province: East Azerbaijan
- County: Sarab
- District: Mehraban
- Rural District: Ardalan

Population (2016)
  - Total: 1,139
- Time zone: UTC+3:30 (IRST)

Arzanaq (Persian: ارزنق) is a village in Ardalan Rural District of Mehraban District in Sarab County, East Azerbaijan province, Iran.

== Demographics ==
=== Population ===
At the time of the 2006 National Census, the village's population was 1,407 in 250 households. The following census in 2011 counted 1,253 people in 307 households. The 2016 census measured the population of the village as 1,139 people in 329 households.
