= Qeshlaq-e Mohammad Beyg =

Qeshlaq-e Mohammad Beyg (Persian: قشلاق محمدبيگ), also rendered as Qeshlaq-e Mohammad Beyk, may refer to:

- Qeshlaq-e Mohammad Beyg-e Olya, Ardabil Province, Iran
- Qeshlaq-e Mohammad Beyg-e Sofla, Ardabil Province, Iran
