= Vaneq =

Vaneq (Persian: وانق) may refer to:

- Vaneq-e Olya
- Vaneq-e Sofla
