= Shablu =

Village in Ardabil province, Iran

Shablu Persian: شبلو
- Village
- Location within Iran
- Coordinates: 38°03′20″N 48°31′08″E
- Country: Iran
- Province: Ardabil
- County: Ardabil
- District: Hir
- Rural District: Hir

Population (2016)
  - Total: 383
- Time zone: UTC+3:30 (IRST)

Shablu (Persian: شبلو) (Note: Also romanized as Shablū; also known as Shablī) is a village in Hir Rural District of Hir District in Ardabil County, Ardabil province, Iran.

== Demographics ==
=== Population ===
At the time of the 2006 National Census, the village's population was 617 in 130 households. The following census in 2011 counted 537 people in 134 households. The 2016 census measured the population of the village as 383 people in 123 households.
