= Berenjabad, East Azerbaijan =

Village in East Azerbaijan province, Iran

Berenjabad Persian: برنج اباد
- Village
- Location within Iran
- Coordinates: 37°50′09″N 47°04′21″E
- Country: Iran
- Province: East Azerbaijan
- County: Sarab
- District: Mehraban
- Rural District: Sharabian

Population (2016)
  - Total: 405
- Time zone: UTC+3:30 (IRST)

Berenjabad (Persian: برنج اباد) (Note: Also romanized as Berenjābād; also known as Birinjābād) is a village in Sharabian Rural District of Mehraban District in Sarab County, East Azerbaijan province, Iran.

== Demographics ==
=== Population ===
At the time of the 2006 National Census, the village's population was 354 in 69 households. The following census in 2011 counted 400 people in 101 households. The 2016 census measured the population of the village as 405 people in 109 households.
