= Koljeh =

Koljeh (Persian: كلوجه) may refer to:

- Koljeh, Ardabil
- Koljeh, East Azerbaijan
- Koljeh, Zanjan
