= Domdomeh =

Village in Ardabil province, Iran

Domdomeh Persian: دمدمه
- Village
- Location within Iran
- Coordinates: 38°06′36″N 48°35′34″E
- Country: Iran
- Province: Ardabil
- County: Ardabil
- District: Hir
- Rural District: Hir

Population (2016)
  - Total: 152
- Time zone: UTC+3:30 (IRST)

Domdomeh (Persian: دمدمه) is a village in Hir Rural District of Hir District in Ardabil County, Ardabil province, Iran.

== Demographics ==
=== Population ===
At the time of the 2006 National Census, the village's population was 242 in 53 households. The following census in 2011 counted 231 people in 66 households. The 2016 census measured the population of the village as 152 people in 42 households.
