= Jiavan =

Village in Ardabil province, Iran

Jiavan Persian: جياوان
- Village
- Location within Iran
- Coordinates: 37°58′19″N 48°24′59″E
- Country: Iran
- Province: Ardabil
- County: Ardabil
- District: Hir
- Rural District: Fuladlui-ye Jonubi

Population (2016)
  - Total: 167
- Time zone: UTC+3:30 (IRST)

Jiavan (Persian: جياوان) (Note: Also romanized as Dzhiavan, Jeyāvān and Jīāvān; also known as Jīāravān) is a village in Fuladlui-ye Jonubi Rural District of Hir District in Ardabil County, Ardabil province, Iran.

== Demographics ==
=== Population ===
At the time of the 2006 National Census, the village's population was 226 in 47 households. The following census in 2011 counted 174 people in 44 households. The 2016 census measured the population of the village as 167 people in 51 households.
