= Qayeh Chaman =

Village in Ardabil province, Iran

Qayeh Chaman Persian: قيه چمن
- Village
- Location within Iran
- Coordinates: 37°59′19″N 48°30′54″E
- Country: Iran
- Province: Ardabil
- County: Ardabil
- District: Hir
- Rural District: Fuladlui-ye Jonubi

Population (2016)
  - Total: 54
- Time zone: UTC+3:30 (IRST)

Qayeh Chaman (Persian: قيه چمن) (Note: Also known as Qarah Chaman and Qareh Chaman) is a village in Fuladlui-ye Jonubi Rural District of Hir District in Ardabil County, Ardabil province, Iran.

== Demographics ==
=== Population ===
At the time of the 2006 National Census, the village's population was 145 in 27 households. The following census in 2011 counted 135 people in 30 households. The 2016 census measured the population of the village as 54 people in 15 households.
