= Jeldeh Bakhan =

Village in East Azerbaijan province, Iran

Jeldeh Bakhan Persian: جلده باخان
- Village
- Location within Iran
- Coordinates: 37°50′01″N 47°40′40″E
- Country: Iran
- Province: East Azerbaijan
- County: Sarab
- District: Central
- Rural District: Molla Yaqub

Population (2016)
  - Total: 643
- Time zone: UTC+3:30 (IRST)

Jeldeh Bakhan (Persian: جلده باخان) (Note: Also romanized as Jaldeh Bākhān, Jeldah Bākhān, and Jeldeh Bākhān; also known as Jaldo Bakhan) is a village in Molla Yaqub Rural District of the Central District in Sarab County, East Azerbaijan province, Iran.

== Demographics ==
=== Population ===
At the time of the 2006 National Census, the village's population was 784 in 161 households. The following census in 2011 counted 779 people in 219 households. The 2016 census measured the population of the village as 643 people in 195 households.
