= Bilah Daraq, Ardabil =

Village in Ardabil province, Iran

Bilah Daraq Persian: بيله درق
- Village
- Location within Iran
- Coordinates: 38°08′35″N 48°36′12″E
- Country: Iran
- Province: Ardabil
- County: Ardabil
- District: Hir
- Rural District: Hir

Population (2016)
  - Total: 200
- Time zone: UTC+3:30 (IRST)

Bilah Daraq (Persian: بيله درق) is a village in Hir Rural District of Hir District in Ardabil County, Ardabil province, Iran.

== Demographics ==
=== Population ===
At the time of the 2006 National Census, the village's population was 403 in 81 households. The following census in 2011 counted 273 people in 69 households. The 2016 census measured the population of the village as 200 people in 57 households.
