= Vaneq-e Olya =

Vaneq-e Olya وانق عليا
- Village
- Location within Iran
- Coordinates: 37°52′23″N 47°46′38″E
- Country: Iran
- Province: East Azerbaijan
- County: Sarab
- Bakhsh: Central
- Rural District: Molla Yaqub

Population (2006)
  - Total: 103
- Time zone: UTC+3:30 (IRST)
  - Summer (DST): UTC+4:30 (IRDT)

Vaneq-e Olya (Persian: وانق عليا, also Romanized as Vāneq-e ‘Olyā; also known as Vāneq-e Bālā) is a village in Molla Yaqub Rural District, in the Central District of Sarab County, East Azerbaijan Province, Iran. At the 2006 census, its population was 103, in 18 families.
