= Yurchi =

Yurchi (Persian: يورچي) or Yurtchi (يورتچي) may refer to:

- Yurchi, East Azerbaijan
- Yurtchi-ye Gharbi Rural District, in Ardabil Province
- Yurtchi-ye Sharqi Rural District, in Ardabil Province
