= Kuhsareh =

Village in Ardabil province, Iran

Kuhsareh Persian: كوهساره
- Village
- Location within Iran
- Coordinates: 38°04′21″N 48°34′55″E
- Country: Iran
- Province: Ardabil
- County: Ardabil
- District: Hir
- Rural District: Hir

Population (2016)
  - Total: 343
- Time zone: UTC+3:30 (IRST)

Kuhsareh (Persian: كوهساره) (Note: Also romanized as Kūhsārah and Kūhsāreh; also known as Kūhsar Deh) is a village in Hir Rural District of Hir District in Ardabil County, Ardabil province, Iran.

== Demographics ==
=== Population ===
At the time of the 2006 National Census, the village's population was 612 in 136 households. The following census in 2011 counted 539 people in 118 households. The 2016 census measured the population of the village as 343 people in 100 households.
