= Chanzab =

Village in Ardabil province, Iran

Chanzab Persian: چنذاب
- Village
- Location within Iran
- Coordinates: 38°02′43″N 48°29′56″E
- Country: Iran
- Province: Ardabil
- County: Ardabil
- District: Hir
- Rural District: Hir

Population (2016)
  - Total: 95
- Time zone: UTC+3:30 (IRST)

Chanzab (Persian: چنذاب) (Note: Also romanized as Chanz̄āb) is a village in Hir Rural District of Hir District in Ardabil County, Ardabil province, Iran.

== Demographics ==
=== Population ===
At the time of the 2006 National Census, the village's population was 174 in 40 households. The following census in 2011 counted 123 people in 32 households. The 2016 census measured the population of the village as 95 people in 33 households.
