= Ardeha =

Village in East Azerbaijan province, Iran

Ardeha Persian: اردها
- Village
- Location within Iran
- Coordinates: 37°49′47″N 47°39′22″E
- Country: Iran
- Province: East Azerbaijan
- County: Sarab
- District: Central
- Rural District: Molla Yaqub

Population (2016)
  - Total: 1,647
- Time zone: UTC+3:30 (IRST)

Ardeha (Persian: اردها) (Note: Also romanized as Ardaha, Ardahā, and Ardehā) is a village in, and the capital of, Molla Yaqub Rural District in the Central District of Sarab County, East Azerbaijan province, Iran.

== Demographics ==
=== Population ===
At the time of the 2006 National Census, the village's population was 1,677 in 395 households. The following census in 2011 counted 1,691 people in 466 households. The 2016 census measured the population of the village as 1,647 people in 503 households. It was the most populous village in its rural district.
