= Mahmudabad, Ardabil =

Village in Ardabil province, Iran

Mahmudabad Persian: محموداباد
- Village
- Location within Iran
- Coordinates: 37°59′47″N 48°29′01″E
- Country: Iran
- Province: Ardabil
- County: Ardabil
- District: Hir
- Rural District: Fuladlui-ye Jonubi

Population (2016)
  - Total: 176
- Time zone: UTC+3:30 (IRST)

Mahmudabad (Persian: محموداباد) (Note: Also romanized as Maḩmūdābād) is a village in Fuladlui-ye Jonubi Rural District of Hir District in Ardabil County, Ardabil province, Iran.

== Demographics ==
=== Population ===
At the time of the 2006 National Census, the village's population was 204 in 46 households. The following census in 2011 counted 193 people in 62 households. The 2016 census measured the population of the village as 176 people in 72 households.
