= Hesar, Ardabil =

Village in Ardabil province, Iran

Hesar Persian: حصار
- Village
- Location within Iran
- Coordinates: 38°04′02″N 48°25′18″E
- Country: Iran
- Province: Ardabil
- County: Ardabil
- District: Hir
- Rural District: Fuladlui-ye Shomali

Population (2016)
  - Total: 111
- Time zone: UTC+3:30 (IRST)

Hessar (Persian: حصار) (Note: Also romanized as Ḩeşār) is a village in Fuladlui-ye Shomali Rural District of Hir District in Ardabil County, Ardabil province, Iran.

website: Hessar.ir

== Demographics ==
=== Population ===
At the time of the 2006 National Census, the village's population was 63 in 15 households. The following census in 2011 counted 109 people in 28 households. The 2016 census measured the population of the village as 111 people in 33 households.
