= Asnaq =

Village in East Azerbaijan province, Iran

Asnaq Persian: اسنق
- Village
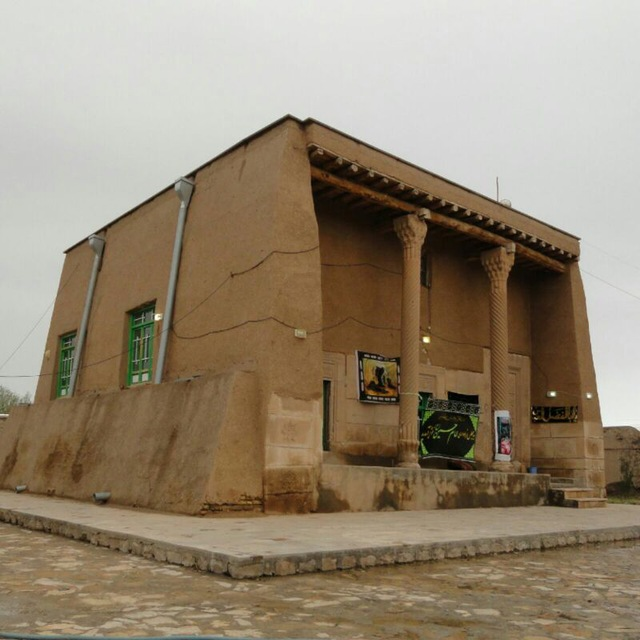

- Location within Iran
- Coordinates: 38°03′47″N 47°11′17″E
- Country: Iran
- Province: East Azerbaijan
- County: Sarab
- District: Mehraban
- Rural District: Ardalan

Population (2016)
  - Total: 520
- Time zone: UTC+3:30 (IRST)

Asnaq (Persian: اسنق) is a village in, and the capital of, Ardalan Rural District in Mehraban District of Sarab County, East Azerbaijan province, Iran.

== Demographics ==
=== Population ===
At the time of the 2006 National Census, the village's population was 725 in 175 households. The following census in 2011 counted 620 people in 185 households. The 2016 census measured the population of the village as 520 people in 187 households.
