= Now Shahr, Ardabil =

Village in Ardabil province, Iran

Now Shahr Persian: نوشهر
- Village
- Location within Iran
- Coordinates: 38°05′20″N 48°25′16″E
- Country: Iran
- Province: Ardabil
- County: Ardabil
- District: Hir
- Rural District: Fuladlui-ye Shomali

Population (2016)
  - Total: 1,695
- Time zone: UTC+3:30 (IRST)

Now Shahr (Persian: نوشهر) (Note: Also known as Now Shār and Nushar) is a village in Fuladlui-ye Shomali Rural District of Hir District in Ardabil County, Ardabil province, Iran.

== Demographics ==
=== Population ===
At the time of the 2006 National Census, the village's population was 1,704 in 352 households. The following census in 2011 counted 1,592 people in 421 households. The 2016 census measured the population of the village as 1,695 people in 520 households.
