= Guradel =

Village in Ardabil province, Iran

Guradel Persian: گورادل
- Village
- Location within Iran
- Coordinates: 38°08′52″N 48°21′37″E
- Country: Iran
- Province: Ardabil
- County: Ardabil
- District: Hir
- Rural District: Fuladlui-ye Shomali

Population (2016)
  - Total: 396
- Time zone: UTC+3:30 (IRST)

Guradel (Persian: گورادل) (Note: Also romanized as Gūrādel; also known as Gūrādīl, Karādel, Keradel, and Keravīl) is a village in Fuladlui-ye Shomali Rural District of Hir District in Ardabil County, Ardabil province, Iran.

== Demographics ==
=== Population ===
At the time of the 2006 National Census, the village's population was 377 in 91 households. The following census in 2011 counted 361 people in 103 households. The 2016 census measured the population of the village as 396 people in 125 households.
