= Shalqun =

Village in East Azerbaijan province, Iran

Shalqun Persian: شالقون
- Village
- Location within Iran
- Coordinates: 37°48′59″N 47°36′47″E
- Country: Iran
- Province: East Azerbaijan
- County: Sarab
- District: Central
- Rural District: Molla Yaqub

Population (2016)
  - Total: 878
- Time zone: UTC+3:30 (IRST)

Shalqun (Persian: شالقون) (Note: Also romanized as Shālqūn; also known as Shelgun) is a village in Molla Yaqub Rural District of the Central District in Sarab County, East Azerbaijan province, Iran.

== Demographics ==
=== Population ===
At the time of the 2006 National Census, the village's population was 909 in 239 households. The following census in 2011 counted 891 people in 258 households. The 2016 census measured the population of the village as 878 people in 270 households.
