= Gol Tappeh-ye Malali =

Village in Ardabil province, Iran

Gol Tappeh-ye Malali Persian: گل تپه ملالي
- Village
- Location within Iran
- Coordinates: 38°01′35″N 48°20′07″E
- Country: Iran
- Province: Ardabil
- County: Ardabil
- District: Hir
- Rural District: Fuladlui-ye Shomali

Population (2016)
  - Total: 40
- Time zone: UTC+3:30 (IRST)

Gol Tappeh-ye Malali (Persian: گل تپه ملالي) (Note: Also romanized as Gol Tappeh-ye Malālī; also known as Gol Tappeh-ye Mollā’ī) is a village in Fuladlui-ye Shomali Rural District of Hir District in Ardabil County, Ardabil province, Iran.

== Demographics ==
=== Population ===
At the time of the 2006 National Census, the village's population was 123 in 27 households. The following census in 2011 counted 85 people in 19 households. The 2016 census measured the population of the village as 40 people in 11 households.
