= Ainalu =

Village in Ardabil province, Iran

Ainalu Persian: اينلو
- Village
- Location within Iran
- Coordinates: 37°59′20″N 48°23′49″E
- Country: Iran
- Province: Ardabil
- County: Ardabil
- District: Hir
- Rural District: Fuladlui-ye Jonubi

Population (2016)
  - Total: 252
- Time zone: UTC+3:30 (IRST)

Ainalu (Persian: اينلو) (Note: Also romanized as Aīnalū and Īnalū; also known as Anili and Anīlū) is a village in Fuladlui-ye Jonubi Rural District of Hir District in Ardabil County, Ardabil province, Iran.

== Demographics ==
=== Population ===
At the time of the 2006 National Census, the village's population was 582 in 95 households. The following census in 2011 counted 497 people in 126 households. The 2016 census measured the population of the village as 252 people in 71 households.
