= Helabad =

Village in Ardabil province, Iran

Helabad Persian: هل آباد
- Village
- Location within Iran
- Coordinates: 37°56′12″N 48°25′22″E
- Country: Iran
- Province: Ardabil
- County: Ardabil
- District: Hir
- Rural District: Fuladlui-ye Jonubi

Population (2016)
  - Total: 108
- Time zone: UTC+3:30 (IRST)

Hellabad (Persian: هل آباد) (Note: Also romanized as Helābād; also known as Gilyabad) is a village in Fuladlui-ye Jonubi Rural District of Hir District in Ardabil County, Ardabil province, Iran.

== Demographics ==
=== Population ===
At the time of the 2006 National Census, the village's population was 137 in 32 households. The following census in 2011 counted 96 people in 24 households. The 2016 census measured the population of the village as 108 people in 35 households.
