= Razliq Castle =

Castle in East Azerbaijan Province, Iran

- قلعه رازلیق

General information
- Type: Castle
- Location: Sarab County, Iran

Razliq Castle (Persian: قلعه رازلیق) is a historical castle located in Sarab County in East Azerbaijan Province, The longevity of this fortress dates back to the 1st millennium BC.
