= Ayuriq =

Village in Ardabil province, Iran

Ayuriq Persian: ايوريق
- Village
- Location within Iran
- Coordinates: 38°10′20″N 48°31′31″E
- Country: Iran
- Province: Ardabil
- County: Ardabil
- District: Hir
- Rural District: Fuladlui-ye Shomali

Population (2016)
  - Total: 1,507
- Time zone: UTC+3:30 (IRST)

Ayuriq (Persian: ايوريق) (Note: Also romanized as Ayūrīq, Īvrīq, and Yūrīq) is a village in Fuladlui-ye Shomali Rural District of Hir District in Ardabil County, Ardabil province, Iran.

== Demographics ==
=== Population ===
At the time of the 2006 National Census, the village's population was 1,463 in 309 households. The following census in 2011 counted 1,593 people in 420 households. The 2016 census measured the population of the village as 1,507 people in 396 households.
