= Davil =

Village in Ardabil province, Iran

Davil Persian: دويل
- Village
- Location within Iran
- Coordinates: 38°07′37″N 48°30′44″E
- Country: Iran
- Province: Ardabil
- County: Ardabil
- District: Hir
- Rural District: Hir

Population (2016)
  - Total: 104
- Time zone: UTC+3:30 (IRST)

Davil (Persian: دويل) (Note: Also romanized as Davīl and Dovīl) is a village in Hir Rural District of Hir District in Ardabil County, Ardabil province, Iran.

== Demographics ==
=== Population ===
At the time of the 2006 National Census, the village's population was 184 in 39 households. The following census in 2011 counted 111 people in 29 households. The 2016 census measured the population of the village as 104 people in 34 households.
