= Qarah Vali, Ardabil =

Village in Ardabil province, Iran

Qarah Vali Persian: قره ولي
- Village
- Location within Iran
- Coordinates: 38°02′01″N 48°26′30″E
- Country: Iran
- Province: Ardabil
- County: Ardabil
- District: Hir
- Rural District: Fuladlui-ye Jonubi

Population (2016)
  - Total: 34
- Time zone: UTC+3:30 (IRST)

Qarah Vali (Persian: قره ولي) (Note: Also romanized as Qarah Valī and Qarahvalī; also known as Yāstī Bolāghī) is a village in Fuladlui-ye Jonubi Rural District of Hir District in Ardabil County, Ardabil province, Iran.

== Demographics ==
=== Population ===
At the time of the 2006 National Census, the village's population was 41 in eight households. The following census in 2011 counted 24 people in seven households. The 2016 census measured the population of the village as 34 people in 10 households.
