= Duniq, Iran =

Duniq دونيق
- Village
- Location within Iran
- Coordinates: 37°51′31″N 47°35′51″E
- Country: Iran
- Province: East Azerbaijan
- County: Sarab
- Bakhsh: Central
- Rural District: Molla Yaqub

Population (2006)
  - Total: 341
- Time zone: UTC+3:30 (IRST)
  - Summer (DST): UTC+4:30 (IRDT)

Duniq (Persian: دونيق, also Romanized as Dūnīq) is a village in Molla Yaqub Rural District, in the Central District of Sarab County, East Azerbaijan Province, Iran. At the 2006 census, its population was 341, in 81 families.
