= Esmailabad, East Azerbaijan =

Village in East Azerbaijan province, Iran

Esmailabad Persian: اسماعيل اباد
- Village
- Location within Iran
- Coordinates: 37°49′47″N 47°02′33″E
- Country: Iran
- Province: East Azerbaijan
- County: Sarab
- District: Mehraban
- Rural District: Sharabian

Population (2016)
  - Total: 396
- Time zone: UTC+3:30 (IRST)

Esmailabad (Persian: اسماعيل اباد) (Note: Also romanized as Esmā‘īlābād; also known as Yūqūrtchī and Yurchi) is a village in Sharabian Rural District of Mehraban District in Sarab County, East Azerbaijan province, Iran.

== Demographics ==
=== Population ===
At the time of the 2006 National Census, the village's population was 374 in 88 households. The following census in 2011 counted 380 people in 101 households. The 2016 census measured the population of the village as 396 people in 153 households.
