= Almagalan =

Village in Ardabil province, Iran

Almagalan Persian: الماگلن
- Village
- Location within Iran
- Coordinates: 38°01′49″N 48°24′31″E
- Country: Iran
- Province: Ardabil
- County: Ardabil
- District: Hir
- Rural District: Fuladlui-ye Jonubi

Population (2016)
  - Total: 24
- Time zone: UTC+3:30 (IRST)

Almagalan (Persian: الماگلن) (Note: Also romanized as Ālmāgalan; also known as Rostam Qeshlāqī) is a village in Fuladlui-ye Jonubi Rural District of Hir District in Ardabil County, Ardabil province, Iran.

== Demographics ==
=== Population ===
At the time of the 2006 National Census, the village's population was 50 in nine households. The following census in 2011 counted 35 people in 10 households. The 2016 census measured the population of the village as 24 people in seven households.
