= Baqarabad, Ardabil =

Village in Ardabil province, Iran

Baqarabad Persian: بُقرآباد
- Village
- Location within Iran
- Coordinates: 38°08′22″N 48°33′04″E
- Country: Iran
- Province: Ardabil
- County: Ardabil
- District: Hir
- Rural District: Hir

Population (2016)
  - Total: 625
- Time zone: UTC+3:30 (IRST)

Baqarabad (Persian: بقراباد) (Note: Also romanized as Baqarābād; also known as Boghrabad) is a village in Hir Rural District of Hir District in Ardabil County, Ardabil province, Iran.

== Demographics ==
=== Population ===
At the time of the 2006 National Census, the village's population was 838 in 181 households. The following census in 2011 counted 679 people in 183 households. The 2016 census measured the population of the village as 625 people in 188 households.
