= Firuzabad, Ardabil =

Village in Ardabil province, Iran

Firuzabad Persian: فيروزاباد
- Village
- Location within Iran
- Coordinates: 37°57′11″N 48°30′42″E
- Country: Iran
- Province: Ardabil
- County: Ardabil
- District: Hir
- Rural District: Fuladlui-ye Jonubi

Population (2016)
  - Total: 29
- Time zone: UTC+3:30 (IRST)

Firuzabad (Persian: فيروزاباد) (Note: Also romanized as Fīrūzābād) is a village in Fuladlui-ye Jonubi Rural District of Hir District in Ardabil County, Ardabil province, Iran.

== Demographics ==
=== Population ===
At the time of the 2006 National Census, the village's population was 80 in 18 households. The following census in 2011 counted 38 people in 10 households. The 2016 census measured the population of the village as 29 people in 12 households.
