= Duniq =

Duniq may refer to:

- Duniq, Iran, a village in Iran
- Duniq, Syria, a village in Aleppo Governorate, Syria
