= Aralluy-e Kuchek =

Neighborhood in Ardabil province, Iran

Aralluy-e Kuchek Persian: ارالوي کوچک
- Neighborhood
- Location within Iran
- Coordinates: 38°08′05″N 48°25′07″E
- Country: Iran
- Province: Ardabil
- County: Ardabil
- District: Hir
- City: Arallu

Population (2016)
  - Total: 611
- Time zone: UTC+3:30 (IRST)

Aralluy-e Kuchek (Persian: ارالوی کوچک) (Note: Also romanized as Ārāllūy-e Kūchek; also known as Ārāllū and Ārāllū-ye Kūchek) is a neighborhood in Arallu of Hir District in Ardabil County, Ardabil province, Iran.

== Demographics ==
=== Population ===
At the time of the 2006 National Census, Aralluy-e Kuchek's population was 716 in 148 households, when it was a village in Fuladlui-ye Shomali Rural District. The following census in 2011 counted 613 people in 170 households. The 2016 census measured the population of the village as 611 people in 186 households.

The village of Aralluy-e Bozorg merged with Aralluy-e Kuchek to become the new city of Arallu in 2019.
