= Kalkhuran =

Village in Ardabil province, Iran

Kalkhuran Persian: كلخوران
- Village
- Location within Iran
- Coordinates: 38°07′23″N 48°29′49″E
- Country: Iran
- Province: Ardabil
- County: Ardabil
- District: Hir
- Rural District: Hir

Population (2016)
  - Total: 240
- Time zone: UTC+3:30 (IRST)

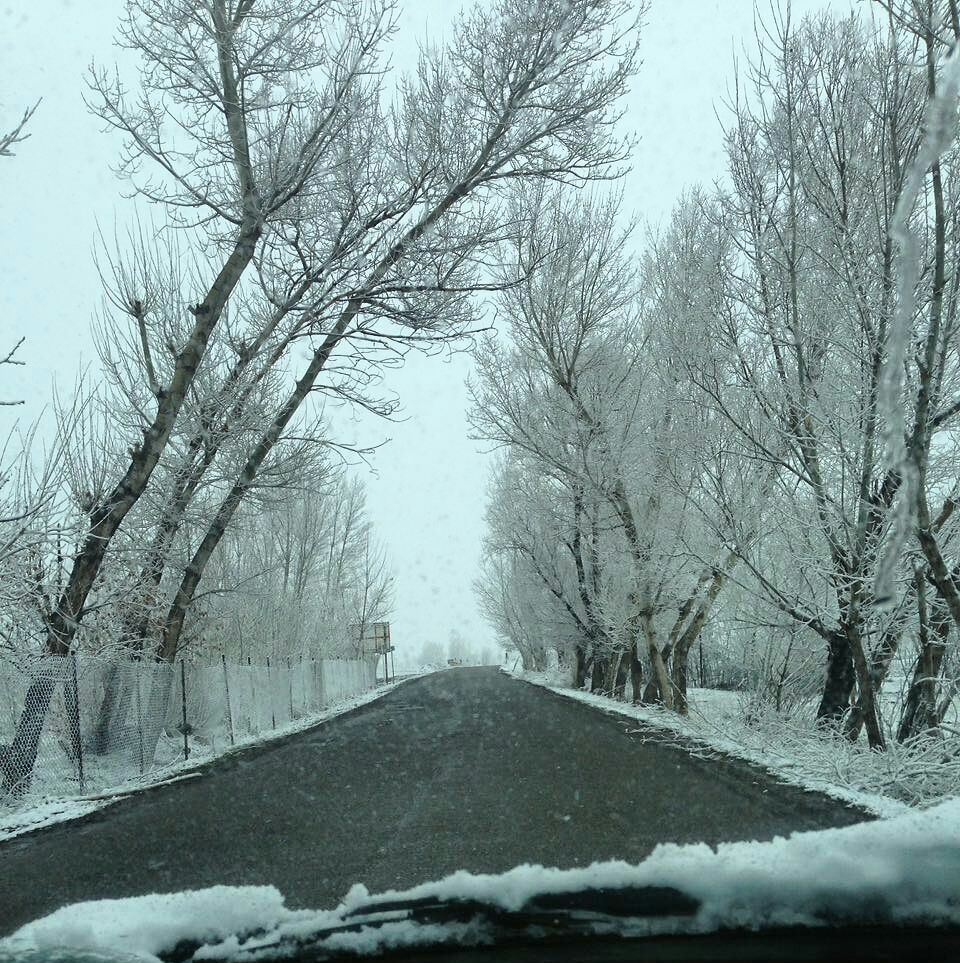

Kalkhuran (Persian: كلخوران) (Note: Also romanized as Kalkhūrān) is a village in Hir Rural District of Hir District in Ardabil County, Ardabil province, Iran.

== Demographics ==
=== Population ===
At the time of the 2006 National Census, the village's population was 390 in 70 households. The following census in 2011 counted 248 people in 59 households. The 2016 census measured the population of the village as 240 people in 63 households.
