= Hefzabad =

Village in Ardabil province, Iran

Hefzabad Persian: حفظاباد
- Village
- Location within Iran
- Coordinates: 37°58′31″N 48°28′27″E
- Country: Iran
- Province: Ardabil
- County: Ardabil
- District: Hir
- Rural District: Fuladlui-ye Jonubi

Population (2016)
  - Total: 170
- Time zone: UTC+3:30 (IRST)

Hefzabad (Azerbaijani: حفظاباد) (Note: Also romanized as Ḩefz̧ābād) is a village in Fuladlui-ye Jonubi Rural District of Hir District in Ardabil County, Ardabil province, Iran.

== Demographics ==
=== Population ===
At the time of the 2006 National Census, the village's population was 271 in 62 households. The following census in 2011 counted 211 people in 54 households. The 2016 census measured the population of the village as 170 people in 56 households.
