= Ahu Qaleh =

Village in Hir Rural District, Ardabil province, Iran

Ahu Qaleh Persian: اهوقلعه
- Village
- Location within Iran
- Coordinates: 38°6′10″N 48°38′0″E
- Country: Iran
- Province: Ardabil
- County: Ardabil
- District: Hir
- Rural District: Hir

Population (2016)
  - Total: 37
- Time zone: UTC+3:30 (IRST)

Ahu Qaleh (Persian: اهوقلعه) (Note: Also romanized as Āhū Qal‘eh; also known as Āhū Qal‘ehsī, Āy Qal‘eh, and Āy Qal‘ehsī) is a village in Hir Rural District of Hir District in Ardabil County, Ardabil province, Iran.

== Demographics ==
=== Population ===
At the time of the 2006 National Census, the village's population was 103 in 24 households. The following census in 2011 counted 34 people in nine households. The 2016 census measured the population of the village as 37 people in 12 households.
