= Gavar Qaleh =

Village in Ardabil province, Iran

Gavar Qaleh Persian: گورقلعه
- Village
- Location within Iran
- Coordinates: 38°00′51″N 48°26′25″E
- Country: Iran
- Province: Ardabil
- County: Ardabil
- District: Hir
- Rural District: Fuladlui-ye Jonubi

Population (2016)
  - Total: 296
- Time zone: UTC+3:30 (IRST)

Gavar Qaleh (Persian: گورقلعه) (Note: Also romanized as Gāvar Qal‘eh) is a village in Fuladlui-ye Jonubi Rural District of Hir District in Ardabil County, Ardabil province, Iran.

== Demographics ==
=== Population ===
At the time of the 2006 National Census, the village's population was 356 in 74 households. The following census in 2011 counted 343 people in 88 households. The 2016 census measured the population of the village as 296 people in 87 households.
