= Khaneqah, Ardabil =

Village in Ardabil province, Iran

Khaneqah Persian: خانقاه
- Village
- Location within Iran
- Coordinates: 38°07′21″N 48°32′27″E
- Country: Iran
- Province: Ardabil
- County: Ardabil
- District: Hir
- Rural District: Hir

Population (2016)
  - Total: 203
- Time zone: UTC+3:30 (IRST)

Khaneqah (Persian: خانقاه) (Note: Also romanized as Khāneqāh and Khānqāh; also known as Khānegāh) is a village in Hir Rural District of Hir District in Ardabil County, Ardabil province, Iran.

== Demographics ==
=== Population ===
At the time of the 2006 National Census, the village's population was 469 in 112 households. The following census in 2011 counted 335 people in 94 households. The 2016 census measured the population of the village as 203 people in 65 households.
