= Keriq =

Village in Ardabil province, Iran

Keriq Persian: كريق
- Village
- Location within Iran
- Coordinates: 38°11′19″N 48°33′56″E
- Country: Iran
- Province: Ardabil
- County: Ardabil
- District: Hir
- Rural District: Hir

Population (2016)
  - Total: 1,278
- Time zone: UTC+3:30 (IRST)

Keriq (Persian: كريق) (Note: Also romanized as Kerīq) is a village in Hir Rural District of Hir District in Ardabil County, Ardabil province, Iran.

== Demographics ==
=== Population ===
At the time of the 2006 National Census, the village's population was 1,756 in 310 households. The following census in 2011 counted 1,528 people in 397 households. The 2016 census measured the population of the village as 1,278 people in 356 households. It was the populous village in its rural district.
