= Qezel Qayah, Ardabil =

Village in Ardabil province, Iran

Qezel Qayah Persian: قزل قيه
- Village
- Location within Iran
- Coordinates: 38°09′55″N 48°37′22″E
- Country: Iran
- Province: Ardabil
- County: Ardabil
- District: Hir
- Rural District: Hir

Population (2016)
  - Total: 901
- Time zone: UTC+3:30 (IRST)

Qezel Qayah (Persian: قزل قيه) (Note: Also romanized as Qezel Qayeh) is a village in Hir Rural District of Hir District in Ardabil County, Ardabil province, Iran.

== Demographics ==
=== Population ===
At the time of the 2006 National Census, the village's population was 1,095 in 217 households. The following census in 2011 counted 1,118 people in 257 households. The 2016 census measured the population of the village as 901 people in 252 households.
