= Kordali =

Kordali may refer to:

- Kordali language, a Kurdish language of Iran and Iraq
- Kordali, Ardabil, a village in Iran
