= Hirvan =

Village in East Azerbaijan province, Iran

Hirvan Persian: هيروان
- Village
- Location within Iran
- Coordinates: 37°51′56″N 47°37′13″E
- Country: Iran
- Province: East Azerbaijan
- County: Sarab
- District: Central
- Rural District: Molla Yaqub

Population (2016)
  - Total: 664
- Time zone: UTC+3:30 (IRST)

Hirvan (Persian: هيروان) (Note: Also romanized as Hīrvān; also known as Harvān) is a village in Molla Yaqub Rural District of the Central District in Sarab County, East Azerbaijan province, Iran.

== Demographics ==
=== Population ===
At the time of the 2006 National Census, the village's population was 617 in 136 households. The following census in 2011 counted 641 people in 179 households. The 2016 census measured the population of the village as 664 people in 166 households.
