= Ardalan, East Azerbaijan =

Village in East Azerbaijan province, Iran

Ardalan Persian: اردلان
- Village
- Location within Iran
- Coordinates: 38°01′07″N 47°13′59″E
- Country: Iran
- Province: East Azerbaijan
- County: Sarab
- District: Mehraban
- Rural District: Ardalan

Population (2016)
  - Total: 572
- Time zone: UTC+3:30 (IRST)

Ardalan (Persian: اردلان) (Note: Also romanized as Ardalān) is a village in Ardalan Rural District of Mehraban District in Sarab County, East Azerbaijan province, Iran.

== Demographics ==
=== Population ===
At the time of the 2006 National Census, the village's population was 817 in 167 households. The following census in 2011 counted 690 people in 188 households. The 2016 census measured the population of the village as 572 people in 181 households.
