= Eyvaq =

Village in East Azerbaijan province, Iran

Eyvaq Persian: ايوق
- Village
- Location within Iran
- Coordinates: 37°51′58″N 47°08′20″E
- Country: Iran
- Province: East Azerbaijan
- County: Sarab
- District: Mehraban
- Rural District: Sharabian

Population (2016)
  - Total: 1,157
- Time zone: UTC+3:30 (IRST)

Eyvaq (Persian: ايوق) (Note: Also romanized as Īvaq; also known as Eva, Iva, and Ivāh) is a village in Sharabian Rural District of Mehraban District in Sarab County, East Azerbaijan province, Iran.

== Demographics ==
=== Population ===
At the time of the 2006 National Census, the village's population was 1,348 in 294 households. The following census in 2011 counted 1,269 people in 350 households. The 2016 census measured the population of the village as 1,157 people in 353 households.
