= Vaneq-e Sofla =

Vaneq-e Sofla وانق سفلي
- Village
- Location within Iran
- Coordinates: 37°53′01″N 47°45′55″E
- Country: Iran
- Province: East Azerbaijan
- County: Sarab
- Bakhsh: Central
- Rural District: Molla Yaqub

Population (2006)
  - Total: 252
- Time zone: UTC+3:30 (IRST)
  - Summer (DST): UTC+4:30 (IRDT)

Vaneq-e Sofla (Persian: وانق سفلي, also Romanized as Vāneq-e Soflá; also known as Vāneq and Vāneq-e Pā’īn) is a village in Molla Yaqub Rural District, in the Central District of Sarab County, East Azerbaijan Province, Iran. At the 2006 census, its population was 252, in 50 families.
