= Abbasabad, Ardabil =

Village in Ardabil province, Iran

Abbasabad Persian: عباس‌آباد
- Village
- Location within Iran
- Coordinates: 38°01′07″N 48°31′28″E
- Country: Iran
- Province: Ardabil
- County: Ardabil
- District: Hir
- Rural District: Fuladlui-ye Jonubi

Population (2016)
  - Total: 81
- Time zone: UTC+3:30 (IRST)

Abbasabad (Persian: عباس‌آباد) (Note: Also romanized as ‘Abbāsābād) is a village in Fuladlui-ye Jonubi Rural District of Hir District in Ardabil County, Ardabil province, Iran.

== Demographics ==
=== Population ===
At the time of the 2006 National Census, the village's population was 145 in 24 households. The following census in 2011 counted 116 people in 23 households. The 2016 census measured the population of the village as 81 people in 23 households.
