= Khalilabad, Ardabil =

Village in Ardabil province, Iran

Khalilabad Persian: خليل اباد
- Village
- Location within Iran
- Coordinates: 38°09′26″N 48°28′15″E
- Country: Iran
- Province: Ardabil
- County: Ardabil
- District: Hir
- Rural District: Fuladlui-ye Shomali

Population (2016)
  - Total: 1,877
- Time zone: UTC+3:30 (IRST)

Khalilabad (Persian: خليل اباد) (Note: Also romanized as Khalīlābād; also known as Khālehābād) is a village in, and the capital of, Fuladlui-ye Shomali Rural District in Hir District of Ardabil County, Ardabil province, Iran. The previous capital of the rural district was the village of Arallu-ye Bozorg (now the city of Arallu).

== Demographics ==
=== Population ===
At the time of the 2006 National Census, the village's population was 1,955 in 396 households. The following census in 2011 counted 1,972 people in 528 households. The 2016 census measured the population of the village as 1,877 people in 492 households.
