= Kuzah Topraqi =

Village in Ardabil province, Iran

Kuzah Topraqi Persian: كوزه تپراقي
- Village
- Location within Iran
- Coordinates: 38°07′16″N 48°22′04″E
- Country: Iran
- Province: Ardabil
- County: Ardabil
- District: Hir
- Rural District: Fuladlui-ye Shomali

Population (2016)
  - Total: 102
- Time zone: UTC+3:30 (IRST)

Kuzah Topraqi (Persian: كوزه تپراقي) (Note: Also romanized as Kūzah Toprāqī; also known as Kūzah Torpāqī) is a village in Fuladlui-ye Shomali Rural District of Hir District in Ardabil County, Ardabil province, Iran.

== Demographics ==
=== Population ===
At the time of the 2006 National Census, the village's population was 153 in 36 households. The following census in 2011 counted 106 people in 34 households. The 2016 census measured the population of the village as 102 people in 32 households.
