= Budalalu =

Village in Ardabil province, Iran

Budalulu Persian: بودالالو
- Village
- Location within Iran
- Coordinates: 38°01′31″N 48°27′37″E
- Country: Iran
- Province: Ardabil
- County: Ardabil
- District: Hir
- Rural District: Fuladlui-ye Jonubi

Population (2016)
  - Total: 352
- Time zone: UTC+3:30 (IRST)

Budalalu (Persian: بودالالو)) (Note: Also romanized as Būdālālū; also known as Bū Dallāl, Būd Alāl, Būd Ālān, and Būdāllān) is a village in, and the capital of, Fuladlui-ye Jonubi Rural District in Hir District of Ardabil County, Ardabil province, Iran.

== Demographics ==
=== Population ===
At the time of the 2006 National Census, the village's population was 451 in 101 households. The following census in 2011 counted 380 people in 94 households. The 2016 census measured the population of the village as 352 people in 100 households. It was the populous village in its rural district.
