= Alucheh =

Alucheh (Persian: الوچه) may refer to:

- Alucheh Malek, Iran
- Alucheh-ye Fuladlu, Iran
- Alucheh-ye Sabalan, Iran
