= Kargan, Ardabil =

Village in Ardabil province, Iran

Kargan Persian: كرگان
- Village
- Location within Iran
- Coordinates: 38°06′22″N 48°28′58″E
- Country: Iran
- Province: Ardabil
- County: Ardabil
- District: Hir
- Rural District: Hir

Population (2016)
  - Total: 816
- Time zone: UTC+3:30 (IRST)

Kargan (Persian: كرگان) (Note: Also romanized as Kargān) is a village in Hir Rural District of Hir District in Ardabil County, Ardabil province, Iran.

== Demographics ==
=== Population ===
At the time of the 2006 National Census, the village's population was 988 in 208 households. The following census in 2011 counted 884 people in 239 households. The 2016 census measured the population of the village as 816 people in 260 households.
