= Masjedlu =

Masjedlu (Persian: مسجدلو) may refer to:

- Masjedlu, Ardabil
- Masjedlu, Bileh Savar, Ardabil Province
- Masjedlu, Germi, Ardabil Province
- Masjedlu, East Azerbaijan
