= Razamgah =

Village in Ardabil province, Iran

Razamgah Persian: رزمگاه
- Village
- Location within Iran
- Coordinates: 38°02′02″N 48°22′30″E
- Country: Iran
- Province: Ardabil
- County: Ardabil
- District: Hir
- Rural District: Fuladlui-ye Shomali

Population (2016)
  - Total: 61
- Time zone: UTC+3:30 (IRST)

Razamgah (Persian: رزمگاه) (Note: Also romanized as Razamgāh; also known as Razgāh) is a village in Fuladlui-ye Shomali Rural District of Hir District in Ardabil County, Ardabil province, Iran.

== Demographics ==
=== Population ===
At the time of the 2006 National Census, the village's population was 97 in 23 households. The following census in 2011 counted 95 people in 21 households. The 2016 census measured the population of the village as 61 people in 17 households.
