= Yaychi, Ardabil =

Village in Ardabil province, Iran

Yaychi Persian: يايچي
- Village
- Location within Iran
- Coordinates: 38°08′43″N 48°33′12″E
- Country: Iran
- Province: Ardabil
- County: Ardabil
- District: Hir
- Rural District: Hir

Population (2016)
  - Total: 150
- Time zone: UTC+3:30 (IRST)

Yaychi (Persian: يايچي) (Note: Also romanized as Yāychī) is a village in Hir Rural District of Hir District in Ardabil County, Ardabil province, Iran.

== Demographics ==
=== Population ===
At the time of the 2006 National Census, the village's population was 261 in 51 households. The following census in 2011 counted 189 people in 58 households. The 2016 census measured the population of the village as 150 people in 46 households.
