= Qeshlaq-e Mohammad Beyg-e Sofla =

Village in Ardabil province, Iran

Qeshlaq-e Mohammad Beyg-e Sofla Persian: قشلاق محمدبيگ سفلي
- Village
- Location within Iran
- Coordinates: 38°03′37″N 48°34′03″E
- Country: Iran
- Province: Ardabil
- County: Ardabil
- District: Hir
- Rural District: Hir

Population (2016)
  - Total: Below reporting threshold
- Time zone: UTC+3:30 (IRST)

Qeshlaq-e Mohammad Beyg-e Sofla (Persian: قشلاق محمدبيگ سفلي) (Note: Also romanized as Qeshlāq-e Moḩammad Beyg-e Soflá; also known as Qeshlāq-e Moḩammad Beyk-e Soflá and Qeshlaq-e Mohammad Beyk-e Pain (قِشلاقِ مُحَمَّد بِيكِ پائين), also romanized as Qeshlāq-e Moḩammad Beyk-e Pā’īn) is a village in Hir Rural District of Hir District in Ardabil County, Ardabil province, Iran.

== Demographics ==
=== Population ===
At the time of the 2006 National Census, the village's population was 23 in four households. The following census in 2011 counted 17 people in four households. The 2016 census measured the population of the village as below the reporting threshold.
