= Kordali, Ardabil =

Village in Ardabil province, Iran

Kordali Persian: كردعلي
- Village
- Location within Iran
- Coordinates: 38°10′24″N 48°33′28″E
- Country: Iran
- Province: Ardabil
- County: Ardabil
- District: Hir
- Rural District: Hir

Population (2016)
  - Total: 216
- Time zone: UTC+3:30 (IRST)

Kordali (Persian: كردعلي) (Note: Also romanized as Kordʿalī; also known as Kordlū) is a village in Hir Rural District of Hir District in Ardabil County, Ardabil province, Iran.

== Demographics ==
=== Population ===
At the time of the 2006 National Census, the village's population was 247 in 59 households. The following census in 2011 counted 195 people in 52 households. The 2016 census measured the population of the village as 216 people in 63 households.
