= Fuladlui-ye Jonubi Rural District =

Rural district in Ardabil province, Iran

Fuladlui-ye Jonubi Rural District Persian: دهستان فولادلوی جنوبی
- Rural District
- Location within Iran
- Coordinates: 38°00′N 48°29′E
- Country: Iran
- Province: Ardabil
- County: Ardabil
- District: Hir
- Established: 1988
- Capital: Budalalu

Population (2016)
  - Total: 2,021
- Time zone: UTC+3:30 (IRST)

Fuladlui-ye Jonubi Rural District (Persian: دهستان فولادلوی جنوبی) is in Hir District of Ardabil County, Ardabil province, Iran. Its capital is the village of Budalalu.

== Demographics ==
=== Population ===
At the time of the 2006 National Census, the rural district's population was 3,148 in 629 households. There were 2,619 inhabitants in 662 households at the following census of 2011. The 2016 census measured the population of the rural district as 2,021 in 623 households. The most populous of its 20 villages was Budalalu, with 352 people.

=== Other villages in the rural district ===
- Abbasabad
- Ainalu
- Almagalan
- Daliran (Note: Formerly Dalilu)
- Firuzabad
- Gavar Qaleh
- Hefzabad
- Helabad
- Jiavan
- Mahmudabad
- Masjedlu
- Qarah Vali
- Qayeh Chaman
