= Mehraban, Iran =

City in East Azerbaijan province, Iran

Mehraban Persian: مهربان
- City
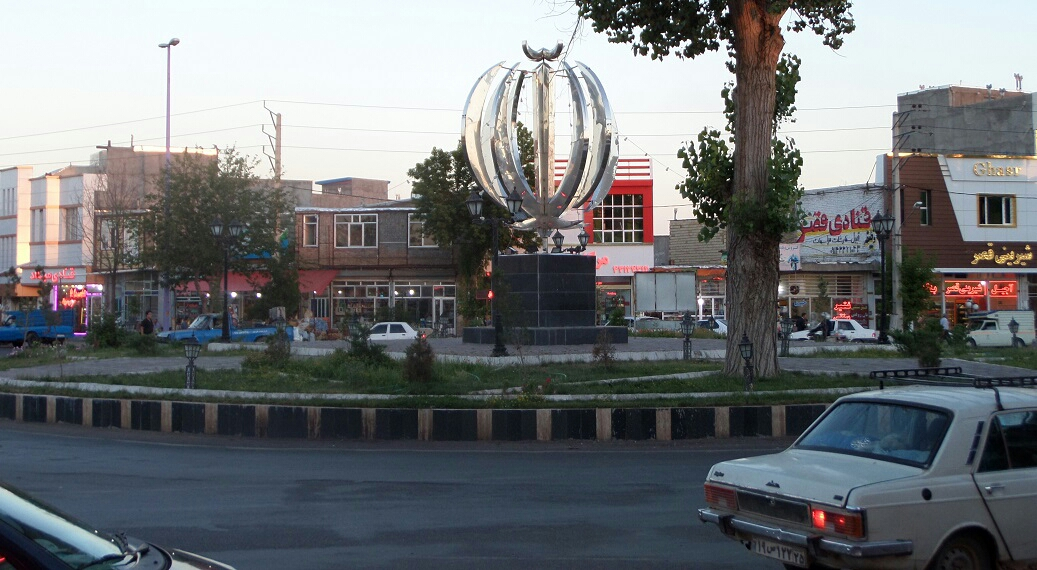

- Location within Iran
- Coordinates: 38°04′52″N 47°07′56″E
- Country: Iran
- Province: East Azerbaijan
- County: Sarab
- District: Mehraban

Population (2016)
  - Total: 12,937
- Time zone: UTC+3:30 (IRST)

Mehraban (Persian: مهربان) (Note: Also romanized as Mehrabān; also known as Mehravān and Mehrevān) is a city in, and the capital of, Mehraban District in Sarab County, East Azerbaijan province, Iran.

== Demographics ==
=== Population ===
At the time of the 2006 National Census, the city's population was 6,000 in 1,542 households. The following census in 2011 counted 6,095 people in 1,728 households. The 2016 census measured the population of the city as 5,772 people in 1,882 households.
