= Shad Baghi, East Azerbaijan =

Village in East Azerbaijan province, Iran

Shad Baghi Persian: شادباغي
- Village
- Location within Iran
- Coordinates: 38°04′02″N 47°09′53″E
- Country: Iran
- Province: East Azerbaijan
- County: Sarab
- District: Mehraban
- Rural District: Ardalan

Population (2016)
  - Total: 390
- Time zone: UTC+3:30 (IRST)

Shad Baghi (Persian: شادباغي) (Note: Formerly known as Shah Baghi (شاهباغي), also romanized as Shāh Bāghī) is a village in Ardalan Rural District of Mehraban District in Sarab County, East Azerbaijan province, Iran.

== Demographics ==
=== Population ===
At the time of the 2006 National Census, the village's population was 439 in 130 households. The following census in 2011 counted 475 people in 145 households. The 2016 census measured the population of the village as 390 people in 108 households.
