= Alucheh-ye Fuladlu =

Village in Ardabil province, Iran

Alucheh-ye Fuladlu Persian: الوچه فولادلو
- Village
- Location within Iran
- Coordinates: 38°03′28″N 48°22′39″E
- Country: Iran
- Province: Ardabil
- County: Ardabil
- District: Hir
- Rural District: Fuladlui-ye Shomali

Population (2016)
  - Total: 291
- Time zone: UTC+3:30 (IRST)

Alucheh-ye Fuladlu (Persian: الوچه فولادلو) (Note: Also romanized as Ālūcheh-ye Fūlādlū; also known as Ālūcheh) is a village in Fuladlui-ye Shomali Rural District of Hir District in Ardabil County, Ardabil province, Iran.

== Demographics ==
=== Population ===
At the time of the 2006 National Census, the village's population was 336 in 79 households. The following census in 2011 counted 316 people in 90 households. The 2016 census measured the population of the village as 291 people in 93 households.
