= Duzduzan =

City in East Azerbaijan province, Iran

Duzduzan Persian: دوزدوزان
- City
- Location within Iran
- Coordinates: 37°56′57″N 47°07′14″E
- Country: Iran
- Province: East Azerbaijan
- County: Sarab
- District: Mehraban
- Established as a city: 2000
- Elevation: 1,687 m (5,535 ft)

Population (2016)
  - Total: 3,627
- Time zone: UTC+3:30 (IRST)
- Postal code: 54911
- Calling code: 0432722
- Website: www.duzduzan.com

Duzduzan (Persian: دوزدوزان) (Note: Also romanized as Dūzdūzān) is a city in Mehraban District of Sarab County, East Azerbaijan province, Iran.

== Demographics ==
=== Population ===
At the time of the 2006 National Census, the city's population was 3,557 in 664 households. The following census in 2011 counted 3,815 people in 897 households. The 2016 census measured the population of the city as 3,627 people in 1,065 households. The village of Duzduzan was converted to a city in 2000.

== Geography ==
Duzduzan is located in the mountains of Arasbaran in north-western Iran on the highway between Ardabil and Tabriz. Although not on the river it is within the drainage basin of the Aji Chay. Because of its high elevation it has a climate that is generally cold and rainy. The city is 15 km by road east of the village of Kurdkandi and 32 km by road east of Bostanabad. Duzduzan is 37 km by road west of the city of Sarab, the county seat.

=== Earthquakes ===
The area is earthquake-prone as it lies on the Duzduzan Fault, in the North Tabriz fault system, just north of the plate boundary where the Arabian Plate is pushing against the Eurasian Plate. The town was heavily shaken in:

- 1721 by the Shebli earthquake (7.3 M_{w})
- 1780 by the Tabriz earthquake (7.4 M_{w})
- 1786 by the Marand-Mishu earthquake (6.3 M_{w})
- 1807 by a quake on the Tasujreverse fault (5.5 M_{w})
- 1879 by the Bozqush earthquake on the South Bozqush Fault (6.7 M_{w})
