= Masjedlu, Ardabil =

Village in Ardabil province, Iran

Masjedlu Persian: مسجدلو
- Village
- Location within Iran
- Coordinates: 38°00′55″N 48°24′05″E
- Country: Iran
- Province: Ardabil
- County: Ardabil
- District: Hir
- Rural District: Fuladlui-ye Jonubi

Population (2016)
  - Total: 59
- Time zone: UTC+3:30 (IRST)

Masjedlu (Persian: مسجدلو) (Note: Also romanized as Masjedlū) is a village in Fuladlui-ye Jonubi Rural District of Hir District in Ardabil County, Ardabil province, Iran.

== Demographics ==
=== Population ===
At the time of the 2006 National Census, the village's population was 117 in 21 households. The following census in 2011 counted 97 people in 26 households. The 2016 census measured the population of the village as 59 people in 18 households.
