= Sharabian =

City in East Azerbaijan province, Iran

Sharabian Persian: شربيان
- City
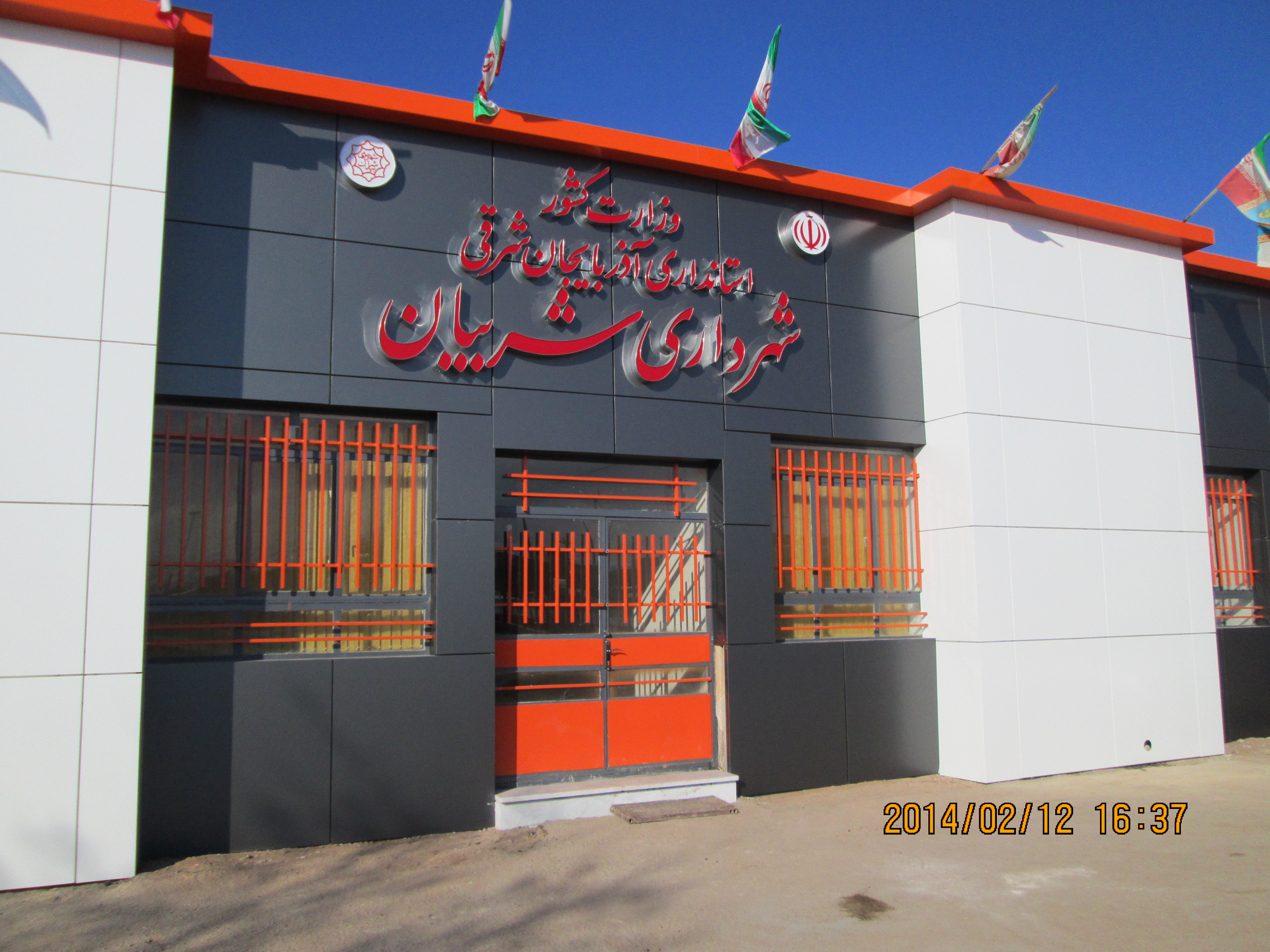

- Location within Iran
- Coordinates: 37°52′51″N 47°06′04″E
- Country: Iran
- Province: East Azerbaijan
- County: Sarab
- District: Mehraban
- Established as a city: 1999

Government
  - Mayor: Saeed Mohammadi

Population (2016)
  - Total: 4,877
- Time zone: UTC+3:30 (IRST)

Sharabian (Persian: شربيان) (Note: Also romanized as Sharabeyān, Sharabīān, and Sharabīyān) is a city in Mehraban District of Sarab County, East Azerbaijan province, Iran, serving as the administrative center for Sharabian Rural District. The village of Sharabian was converted to a city in 1999.

== Demographics ==
=== Population ===
At the time of the 2006 National Census, the city's population was 4,374 in 1,038 households. The following census in 2011 counted 4,737 people in 1,322 households. The 2016 census measured the population of the city as 4,877 people in 1,520 households.
