= Qeshlaq-e Mohammad Beyg-e Olya =

Village in Ardabil province, Iran

Qeshlaq-e Mohammad Beyg-e Olya Persian: قشلاق محمدبيگ عليا
- Village
- Location within Iran
- Coordinates: 38°02′44″N 48°34′18″E
- Country: Iran
- Province: Ardabil
- County: Ardabil
- District: Hir
- Rural District: Hir

Population (2016)
  - Total: 91
- Time zone: UTC+3:30 (IRST)

Qeshlaq-e Mohammad Beyg-e Olya (Persian: قشلاق محمدبيگ عليا) (Note: Also romanized as Qeshlāq-e Moḩammad Beyg-e ‘Olyā; also known as Qeshlaq-e Mohammad Beyk-e Bala (قِشلاقِ مُحَمَّد بِيكِ بالا), also romanized as Qeshlāq-e Moḩammad Beyk-e Bālā; and Qeshlāq-e Moḩammad Beyk-e ‘Olyā) is a village in Hir Rural District of Hir District in Ardabil County, Ardabil province, Iran.

== Demographics ==
=== Population ===
At the time of the 2006 National Census, the village's population was 146 in 32 households. The following census in 2011 counted 105 people in 19 households. The 2016 census measured the population of the village as 91 people in 26 households.
