= Arallu, Ardabil =

City in Ardabil province, Iran

Arallu Persian: آراللو
- City
- Location within Iran
- Coordinates: 38°08′46″N 48°25′25″E
- Country: Iran
- Province: Ardabil
- County: Ardabil
- District: Hir
- Established: 2019

Population (2016)
  - Total: 2,650
- Time zone: UTC+3:30 (IRST)

Arallu (Persian: آراللو) (Note: Formerly Aralluy-e Bozorg (ارالوي بزرگ), also romanized as Ārāllūy-e Bozorg; also known as Ārāllū-ye Bozorg, Bīlah Daraq, and Bīlah Daraq-e Fūlādlū) is a city in Hir District of Ardabil County, Ardabil province, Iran. As the village of Aralluy-e Bozorg, it was the capital of Fuladlui-ye Shomali Rural District until its capital was transferred to the village of Khalilabad.

== Demographics ==
=== Population ===
At the time of the 2006 National Census, the population was 2,276 in 448 households, when it was the village of Aralluy-e Bozorg in Fuladlui-ye Shomali Rural District. The following census in 2011 counted 2,567 people in 655 households. The 2016 census measured the population of the village as 2,650 people in 727 households. It was the most populous village in its rural district.

In 2019, Aralluy-e Bozorg merged with the village of Aralluy-e Kuchek to form the new city of Arallu.
