= Yaychi, West Azerbaijan =

Yaychi يايچي
- Village
- Location within Iran
- Coordinates: 39°08′35″N 44°34′45″E
- Country: Iran
- Province: West Azerbaijan
- County: Chaldoran
- Bakhsh: Central
- Rural District: Baba Jik

Population (2006)
  - Total: 46
- Time zone: UTC+3:30 (IRST)
  - Summer (DST): UTC+4:30 (IRDT)

Yaychi (Persian: يايچي, also Romanized as Yāychī) is a village in Baba Jik Rural District, in the Central District of Chaldoran County, West Azerbaijan Province, Iran. At the 2006 census, its population was 46, in 10 families.
