= Hir, Iran =

City in Ardabil province, Iran

Hir Persian: هیر
- City
- Location within Iran
- Coordinates: 38°04′50″N 48°30′22″E
- Country: Iran
- Province: Ardabil
- County: Ardabil
- District: Hir
- Established as a city: 1997

Population (2016)
  - Total: 2,080
- Time zone: UTC+3:30 (IRST)

Hir (Persian: هیر) (Note: Also romanized as Hīr) is a city in, and the capital of, Hir District in Ardabil County, Ardabil province, Iran, It also serves as the administrative center for Hir Rural District. The village of Hir was converted to a city in 1997.

== Demographics ==
=== Population ===
At the time of the 2006 National Census, the city's population was 2,588 in 663 households. The following census in 2011 counted 2,521 people in 719 households. The 2016 census measured the population of the city as 2,080 people in 681 households.
