= Hir Rural District =

Rural district in Ardabil province, Iran

Hir Rural District Persian: دهستان هیر
- Rural District
- Location within Iran
- Coordinates: 38°07′N 48°35′E
- Country: Iran
- Province: Ardabil
- County: Ardabil
- District: Hir
- Established: 1988
- Capital: Hir

Population (2016)
  - Total: 5,840
- Time zone: UTC+3:30 (IRST)

Hir Rural District (Persian: دهستان هیر) is in Hir District of Ardabil County, Ardabil province, Iran. It is administered from the city of Hir.

== Demographics ==
=== Population ===
At the time of the 2006 National Census, the rural district's population was 8,548. There were 7,146 inhabitants in the following census of 2011. The 2016 census measured the population of the rural district as 5,840. The most populous of its 17 villages was Keriq, with 1,278 people.

=== Other villages in the rural district ===
- Ahu Qaleh
- Baqarabad
- Bilah Daraq
- Chanzab
- Davil
- Domdomeh
- Kalkhuran
- Kargan
- Khaneqah
- Kordali
- Kuhsareh
- Qeshlaq-e Mohammad Beyg-e Olya
- Qeshlaq-e Mohammad Beyg-e Sofla
- Qezel Qayah
- Shablu
- Yaychi
