= Rez Gah, Khuzestan =

Rez Gah رزگه
- Village
- Location within Iran
- Coordinates: 32°37′32″N 48°32′13″E
- Country: Iran
- Province: Khuzestan
- County: Dezful
- Bakhsh: Sardasht
- Rural District: Shahi

Population (2006)
  - Total: 127
- Time zone: UTC+3:30 (IRST)
  - Summer (DST): UTC+4:30 (IRDT)

Rez Gah (Persian: رزگه; also known as Zargah) is a village in Shahi Rural District, Sardasht District, Dezful County, Khuzestan Province, Iran. At the 2006 census, its population was 127, in 27 families.
