= Seyah Dowlan, Ahar =

Seyah Dowlan سيه دولان
- Village
- Location within Iran
- Coordinates: 38°35′15″N 47°19′07″E
- Country: Iran
- Province: East Azerbaijan
- County: Ahar
- Bakhsh: Central
- Rural District: Vargahan

Population (2006)
  - Total: 39
- Time zone: UTC+3:30 (IRST)
  - Summer (DST): UTC+4:30 (IRDT)

Seyah Dowlan (Persian: سيه دولان, romanized: Seyah Dowlān and Sīah Dowlān) is a village in Vargahan Rural District, in the Central District of Ahar County, East Azerbaijan Province, Iran. At the 2006 census, its population was 39, in 8 families.
