= Harris Deller =

American ceramist

- Born: Harris Deller; Brooklyn, New York
- Known for: Ceramic art, Sculpture

Harris Deller is an American ceramist. He is well known for his black and white incised porcelain. He spent most of his teaching career at Southern Illinois University and has work on display in the Museum of Contemporary Art and Design in New York as well as other collections.

== Biography ==
Harris Deller was born in Brooklyn, NY in 1947. He completed a BA at CSUN and an MFA at Cranbrook Academy of Art (1973) studying with Richard DeVore. Deller's work has been shown in 100+ group exhibitions, featured in 15+ solo exhibits in museums and galleries, represented in 25+ major collections, and pictures or cited in 40+ publications. He has received Artists Fellowships from the Illinois Arts Council, Arts Midwest, a regional NEA, and a Fulbright Fellowship to South Korea in 1980/81. Professor Deller was elected a Fellow to the National Council for Education in the Ceramic Arts in 1992 and was awarded membership into the International Academy of Ceramics in 2011.

Harris taught at Southern Illinois University in Carbondale, Illinois from 1975-2013. He received the 2008 NCECA Excellence in Teaching Award for his outstanding contributions to education in the field of ceramics. He continues producing his work at White Roof Studio in Carbondale, Illinois.

== Collections ==
Deller's ceramic works are represented in the following collections:

- Museum of Contemporary Art and Design, New York
- Illinois State Museum, Chicago and Springfield, IL
- Hallmark Art Collection, Kansas City
- Shigaraki Museum of Contemporary Ceramic Art, Japan
- Everson Museum of Art, Syracuse, New York
- San Angelo Museum of Fine Arts, Texas
- Crocker Art Museum, Sacramento
- De Young Museum of Fine Arts, San Francisco.

== Students ==
Some of his students include: Yih-Wen Kuo (1981), Elaine Olafson Henry (1995), Colby Parsons (1998), Veronica L. Watkins (2000), Lou Pierozzi (2001) Brenda Quinn (2003), Greg Cochenet (2004), Bethany Benson (2007), KyoungHwa Oh (2008), Amy Chase (2010), Nick Toebaas (2011), Noel Bailey (2012), and CJ Niehaus (2013)

== See also ==
- American craft
- Ceramics (art)
- Studio pottery
