= Berenjabad, West Azerbaijan =

Berenjabad برنج اباد
- Village
- Location within Iran
- Coordinates: 37°41′10″N 45°10′44″E
- Country: Iran
- Province: West Azerbaijan
- County: Urmia
- Bakhsh: Central
- Rural District: Bash Qaleh

Population (2006)
  - Total: 114
- Time zone: UTC+3:30 (IRST)
  - Summer (DST): UTC+4:30 (IRDT)

Berenjabad (Persian: برنج اباد, also Romanized as Berenjābād; also known as Berengābād) is a village in Bash Qaleh Rural District, in the Central District of Urmia County, West Azerbaijan Province, Iran. At the 2006 census, its population was 114, in 40 families.
