= Reg Deller =

English cricketer

Personal information
- Full name: Reginald Patrick Deller
- Born: 27 March 1933; Paddington, London, England
- Died: 8 February 2001 (aged 67); Barnet, Hertfordshire, England
- Batting: Right-handed
- Bowling: Right-arm fast-medium

Domestic team information
- Years: Team
- 1951–1953: Middlesex

Career statistics
Competition	First-class
Matches	3
Runs scored	4
Batting average	–
100s/50s	–/–
Top score	3*
Balls bowled	222
Wickets	2
Bowling average	63.50
5 wickets in innings	–
10 wickets in match	–
Best bowling	1/35
Catches/stumpings	–/–
- Source: Cricinfo, 8 April 2012

Reginald Patrick Deller (27 March 1933 – 8 February 2001) is an English former cricketer. Deller was a right-handed batsman who bowled right-arm fast-medium. He was born at Paddington, London.

Deller made his first-class debut for Middlesex against Hampshire at Lord's in the 1951 County Championship. He made two further first-class appearances for Essex, against Glamorgan at Lord's, and Oxford University at the University Parks. In his three first-class matches, he scored a total of 4, while with the ball he took 2 wickets at a bowling average of 63.50, with best figures of 1/35. He also played for the Middlesex Second XI between 1949 and 1954.
