= Ardalan, Razavi Khorasan =

Ardalan اردلان
- Village
- Location within Iran
- Coordinates: 36°29′20″N 58°20′28″E
- Country: Iran
- Province: Razavi Khorasan
- County: Firuzeh
- Bakhsh: Taghenkoh
- Rural District: Taghenkoh-e Shomali

Population (2006)
  - Total: 53
- Time zone: UTC+3:30 (IRST)
  - Summer (DST): UTC+4:30 (IRDT)

Ardalan (Persian: اردلان, also romanized as Ardalān) is a village in Taghenkoh-e Shomali Rural District, Taghenkoh District, Firuzeh County, Razavi Khorasan Province, Iran. At the 2006 census, its population was 53, in 14 families.

== See also ==
- List of cities, towns and villages in Razavi Khorasan Province
