= Dəllər Cəyir =

Dallyar Jair
- Municipality
- Location within Azerbaijan
- Coordinates: 40°52′52″N 46°02′03″E
- Country: Azerbaijan
- Rayon: Shamkir

Population
  - Total: 5,038
- Time zone: UTC+4 (AZT)
  - Summer (DST): UTC+5 (AZT)

Dallyar Jayir (also, Dəlilər Cəyir, Dälilär, Dallardzhagir, Dallyar, Dallyar Dzheir, Dallyar-Dzhagir, and Dollyar-Dzhagir) is a village and municipality in the Shamkir Rayon of Azerbaijan. It has a population of 5,038.
