= Daliran =

Village in Ardabil province, Iran

Daliran Persian: دلیران
- Village
- Location within Iran
- Coordinates: 38°02′01″N 48°27′31″E
- Country: Iran
- Province: Ardabil
- County: Ardabil
- District: Hir
- Rural District: Fuladlui-ye Jonubi

Population (2016)
  - Total: 215
- Time zone: UTC+3:30 (IRST)

Daliran (Persian: دلیران) (Note: Formerly Dalilu (دليلو), also romanized as Dalīlū; also known as Dalīlar and Valī Qolī Qeshlāqī) is a village in Fuladlui-ye Jonubi Rural District of Hir District in Ardabil County, Ardabil province, Iran.

== Demographics ==
=== Population ===
At the time of the 2006 National Census, the village's population was 335 in 63 households. The following census in 2011 counted 233 people in 50 households. The 2016 census measured the population of the village as 215 people in 65 households.
