= Fuladlui-ye Shomali Rural District =

Rural district in Ardabil province, Iran

Fuladlui-ye Shomali Rural District Persian: دهستان فولادلوی شمالی
- Rural District
- Location within Iran
- Coordinates: 38°07′N 48°26′E
- Country: Iran
- Province: Ardabil
- County: Ardabil
- District: Hir
- Established: 1988
- Capital: Khalilabad

Population (2016)
  - Total: 9,341
- Time zone: UTC+3:30 (IRST)

Fuladlui-ye Shomali Rural District (Persian: دهستان فولادلوی شمالی) is in Hir District of Ardabil County, Ardabil province, Iran. Its capital is the village of Khalilabad. The previous capital of the rural district was the village of Aralluy-e Bozorg, now the city of Arallu.

== Demographics ==
=== Population ===
At the time of the 2006 National Census, the rural district's population was 9,263 in 1,924 households. There were 9,423 inhabitants in 2,492 households at the following census of 2011. The 2016 census measured the population of the rural district as 9,341 in 2,632 households. The most populous of its 12 villages was Aralluy-e Bozorg (now the city of Arallu), with 2,650 people.

=== Other villages in the rural district ===
- Alucheh-ye Fuladlu
- Ayuriq
- Gol Tappeh-ye Malali
- Guradel
- Hesar
- Kuzah Topraqi
- Now Shahr
- Razamgah
