= Le Hir =

Le Hir is a surname that derives from hir, which means "long" in Breton.

Notable people with the name include:

- Arthur-Marie Le Hir (1811–1868), French Biblical scholar and Orientalist
- René Le Hir (1920–1999), Breton nationalist
- Richard Le Hir (1947–2018), French-born Canadian politician, lawyer and management consultant living in Quebec
