= Razgeh, Chaharmahal and Bakhtiari =

Razgeh رزگه
- Village
- Location within Iran
- Coordinates: 32°13′00″N 50°16′00″E
- Country: Iran
- Province: Chaharmahal and Bakhtiari
- County: Kuhrang
- Bakhsh: Bazoft
- Rural District: Doab

Population (2006)
  - Total: 64
- Time zone: UTC+3:30 (IRST)
  - Summer (DST): UTC+4:30 (IRDT)

Razgeh (Persian: رزگه) is a village in Doab Rural District, Bazoft District, Kuhrang County, Chaharmahal and Bakhtiari Province, Iran. At the 2006 census, its population was 64, in 13 families. The village is populated by Lurs.
