= Dəlilər, Saatly =

Dəlilər
- Municipality
- Location within Azerbaijan
- Coordinates: 39°58′14″N 48°22′21″E
- Country: Azerbaijan
- Rayon: Saatly

Population
  - Total: 2,049
- Time zone: UTC+4 (AZT)
  - Summer (DST): UTC+5 (AZT)

Dəlilər (also, Dalliar and Dallyar) is a village and municipality in the Saatly Rayon of Azerbaijan.

== Population ==
It has a population of 2,049.
