= Shad Baghi, Markazi =

Shad Baghi شادباغي
- Village
- Location within Iran
- Coordinates: 35°18′12″N 49°26′53″E
- Country: Iran
- Province: Markazi
- County: Saveh
- Bakhsh: Nowbaran
- Rural District: Kuhpayeh

Population (2006)
  - Total: 114
- Time zone: UTC+3:30 (IRST)
  - Summer (DST): UTC+4:30 (IRDT)

Shad Baghi (Persian: شادباغي, also Romanized as Shād Bāghī; also known as Shāh Bāghī) is a village in Kuhpayeh Rural District, Nowbaran District, Saveh County, Markazi Province, Iran. At the 2006 census, its population was 114, in 34 families.
