= Dəlilər, Agsu =

Dəlilər
- Municipality
- Location within Azerbaijan
- Coordinates: 40°32′N 48°19′E
- Country: Azerbaijan
- Rayon: Agsu

Population
  - Total: 86
- Time zone: UTC+4 (AZT)
  - Summer (DST): UTC+5 (AZT)

Dəlilər (also, Dəllər, Dallyar, and Dollyar) is a village and the least populous municipality in the Agsu Rayon of Azerbaijan. It has a population of 86.
