= Ardalan Rural District =

Rural district in East Azerbaijan province, Iran

Ardalan Rural District Persian: دهستان اردلان
- Rural District
- Location within Iran
- Coordinates: 38°02′N 47°10′E
- Country: Iran
- Province: East Azerbaijan
- County: Sarab
- District: Mehraban
- Established: 1987
- Capital: Asnaq

Population (2016)
  - Total: 5,381
- Time zone: UTC+3:30 (IRST)

Ardalan Rural District (Persian: دهستان اردلان) is in Mehraban District of Sarab County, East Azerbaijan province, Iran. Its capital is the village of Asnaq.

== Demographics ==
=== Population ===
At the time of the 2006 National Census, the rural district's population was 6,371 in 1,459 households. There were 5,896 inhabitants in 1,628 households at the following census of 2011. The 2016 census measured the population of the rural district as 5,381 in 1,697 households. The most populous of its 11 villages was Qeysaraq, with 2,155 people.

=== Other villages in the rural district ===
- Ardalan
- Arzanaq
- Kivaj
- Shad Baghi
