= Sharabian Rural District =

Rural district in East Azerbaijan province, Iran

Sharabian Rural District Persian: دهستان شربيان
- Rural District
- Location within Iran
- Coordinates: 37°53′N 47°06′E
- Country: Iran
- Province: East Azerbaijan
- County: Sarab
- District: Mehraban
- Established: 1987
- Capital: Sharabian

Population (2016)
  - Total: 4,083
- Time zone: UTC+3:30 (IRST)

Sharabian Rural District (Persian: دهستان شربيان) is in Mehraban District of Sarab County, East Azerbaijan province, Iran. It is administered from the city of Sharabian.

== Demographics ==
=== Population ===
At the time of the 2006 National Census, the rural district's population was 4,378 in 1,005 households. There were 4,279 inhabitants in 1,186 households at the following census of 2011. The 2016 census measured the population of the rural district as 4,083 in 1,262 households. The most populous of its nine villages was Khaki, with 1,465 people.

=== Other villages in the rural district ===
- Berenjabad
- Esmailabad
- Eyvaq
