= Molla Yaqub Rural District =

Rural district in East Azerbaijan province, Iran

Molla Yaqub Rural District Persian: دهستان ملايعقوب
- Rural District
- Location within Iran
- Coordinates: 37°50′N 47°45′E
- Country: Iran
- Province: East Azerbaijan
- County: Sarab
- District: Central
- Capital: Ardeha

Population (2016)
  - Total: 6,071
- Time zone: UTC+3:30 (IRST)

Molla Yaqub Rural District (Persian: دهستان ملايعقوب) is in the Central District of Sarab County, East Azerbaijan province, Iran. Its capital is the village of Ardeha.

== Demographics ==
=== Population ===
At the time of the 2006 National Census, the rural district's population was 6,659 in 1,476 households. There were 6,329 inhabitants in 1,760 households at the following census of 2011. The 2016 census measured the population of the rural district as 6,071 in 1,794 households. The most populous of its 20 villages was Ardeha, with 1,647 people.

=== Other villages in the rural district ===
- Hirvan
- Jeldeh Bakhan
- Shalqun
