= Alan Baraghush Rural District =

Rural district in East Azerbaijan province, Iran

Alan Baraghush Rural District Persian: دهستان آلان برآغوش
- Rural District
- Location within Iran
- Coordinates: 38°07′N 47°17′E
- Country: Iran
- Province: East Azerbaijan
- County: Sarab
- District: Mehraban
- Established: 1987
- Capital: Alan

Population (2016)
  - Total: 4,504
- Time zone: UTC+3:30 (IRST)

Alan Baraghush Rural District (Persian: دهستان آلان برآغوش) is in Mehraban District of Sarab County, East Azerbaijan province, Iran. Its capital is the village of Alan.

== Demographics ==
=== Population ===
At the time of the 2006 National Census, the rural district's population was 6,072 in 1,407 households. There were 5,666 inhabitants in 1,460 households at the following census of 2011. The 2016 census measured the population of the rural district as 4,504 in 1,284 households. The most populous of its 20 villages was Alan, with 1,759 people.

=== Other villages in the rural district ===
- Baraghush
- Damirchi
- Dijan
- Jamalabad
- Sowmaeh Zarrin
