= Mehraban District =

District in East Azerbaijan province, Iran

Mehraban District Persian: بخش مهربان
- District
- Location within Iran
- Coordinates: 38°01′N 47°14′E
- Country: Iran
- Province: East Azerbaijan
- County: Sarab
- Capital: Mehraban

Population (2016)
  - Total: 28,244
- Time zone: UTC+3:30 (IRST)

Mehraban District (Persian: بخش مهربان) is in Sarab County, East Azerbaijan province, Iran. Its capital is the city of Mehraban.

== Demographics ==
=== Population ===
At the time of the 2006 National Census, the district's population was 30,752 in 7,115 households. The following census in 2011 counted 30,488 people in 8,221 households. The 2016 census measured the population of the district as 28,244 inhabitants in 8,710 households.

=== Administrative divisions ===
Mehraban District Population
Administrative Divisions	2006	2011	2016
Alan Baraghush RD	6,072	5,666	4,504
Ardalan RD	6,371	5,896	5,381
Sharabian RD	4,378	4,279	4,083
Duzduzan (city)	3,557	3,815	3,627
Mehraban (city)	6,000	6,095	5,772
Sharabian (city)	4,374	4,737	4,877
Total	30,752	30,488	28,244
RD = Rural District
