= Hir District =

District in Ardabil province, Iran

Hir District Persian: بخش هیَر
- District
- Location within Iran
- Coordinates: 38°04′N 48°30′E
- Country: Iran
- Province: Ardabil
- County: Ardabil
- Capital: Hir

Population (2016)
  - Total: 19,282
- Time zone: UTC+3:30 (IRST)

Hir District (Persian: بخش هیَر) is in Ardabil County, Ardabil province, Iran. Its capital is the city of Hir.

== Demographics ==
=== Population ===
At the time of the 2006 National Census, the district's population was 23,547 in 4,963 households. The following census in 2011 counted 21,709 people in 5,692 households. The 2016 census measured the population of the district as 19,282 inhabitants living in 5,659 households.

In 2019, the village of Aralluy-e Bozorg merged with another village to form the new city of Arallu.

=== Administrative divisions ===
Hir District Population
Administrative Divisions	2006	2011	2016
Fuladlui-ye Jonubi RD	3,148	2,619	2,021
Fuladlui-ye Shomali RD	9,263	9,423	9,341
Hir RD	8,548	7,146	5,840
Arallu (city) (Note: Formerly Aralluy-e Bozorg; became a city after the 2016 census)			
Hir (city)	2,588	2,521	2,080
Total	23,547	21,709	19,282
RD = Rural District
