= Sarab County =

County in East Azerbaijan province, Iran

Sarab County Persian: شهرستان سراب
- County
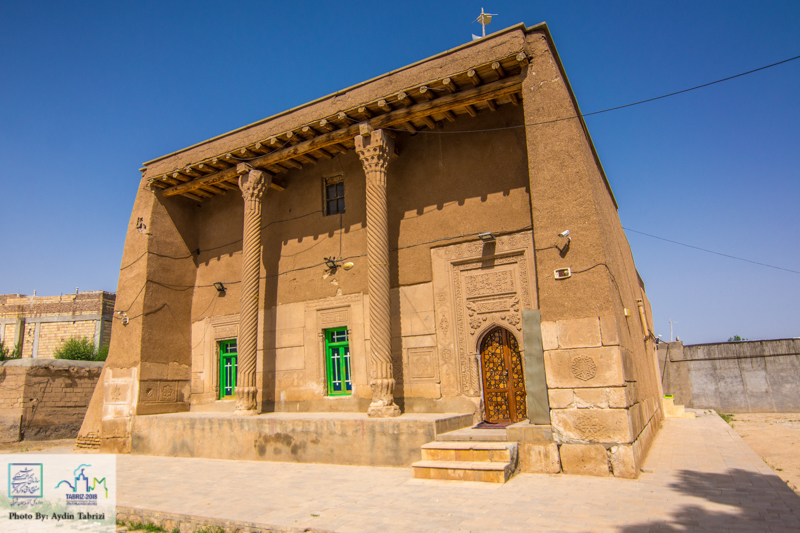
- Stone mosque in the village of Asnaq

- Location of Sarab County in East Azerbaijan province (center right, green)

- Location of East Azerbaijan province in Iran
- Coordinates: 38°00′N 47°29′E
- Country: Iran
- Province: East Azerbaijan
- Capital: Sarab
- Districts: Central, Mehraban

Population (2016)
  - Total: 125,341
- Time zone: UTC+3:30 (IRST)

Sarab County (Persian: شهرستان سراب) is in East Azerbaijan province, Iran. Its capital is the city of Sarab.

== Demographics ==
=== Population ===
At the time of the 2006 National Census, the county's population was 132,094 in 31,977 households. The following census in 2011 counted 131,934 people in 37,029 households. The 2016 census measured the population of the county as 125,341 in 38,446 households.

=== Administrative divisions ===
Sarab County's population history and administrative structure over three consecutive censuses are shown in the following table.

Sarab County Population
Administrative Divisions	2006	2011	2016
Central District	101,342	101,446	97,096
Abarghan RD	13,529	12,239	10,780
Aghmiyun RD	10,481	10,456	9,359
Howmeh RD	14,066	14,069	13,734
Molla Yaqub RD	6,659	6,329	6,071
Razliq RD	10,812	10,040	9,183
Sain RD	3,738	3,467	2,938
Sarab (city)	42,057	44,846	45,031
Mehraban District	30,752	30,488	28,244
Alan Baraghush RD	6,072	5,666	4,504
Ardalan RD	6,371	5,896	5,381
Sharabian RD	4,378	4,279	4,083
Duzduzan (city)	3,557	3,815	3,627
Mehraban (city)	6,000	6,095	5,772
Sharabian (city)	4,374	4,737	4,877
Total	132,094	131,934	125,341
RD = Rural District

== See also ==
Media related to Sarab County at Wikimedia Commons
