= Dizaj =

Dizaj or Dezej (Persian: ديزج), also rendered as Dizeh or Dizach, may refer to:

- Dezej, a city in Kurdistan Province, Iran

== Ardabil Province ==
- Dizaj, Ardabil
- Dizeh, Khalkhal, Ardabil Province

== East Azerbaijan Province ==
- Dizaj, Meyaneh, East Azerbaijan Province
- Dizaj, Osku, East Azerbaijan Province
- Dizaj-e Aqa Hasan, East Azerbaijan Province
- Dizaj Azim, East Azerbaijan Province
- Dizaj-e Hasan Beyg, East Azerbaijan Province
- Dizaj-e Hoseyn Beyg, East Azerbaijan Province
- Dizaj-e Jalu, East Azerbaijan Province
- Dizaj Khalil, East Azerbaijan Province
- Dizaj-e Leyli Khani, East Azerbaijan Province
- Dizaj-e Malek, East Azerbaijan Province
- Dizaj-e Mir Homay, East Azerbaijan Province
- Dizaj-e Parvaneh, East Azerbaijan Province
- Dizaj-e Qorban, East Azerbaijan Province
- Dizaj-e Reza Qoli Beyg, East Azerbaijan Province
- Dizaj-e Safar Ali, East Azerbaijan Province
- Dizaj-e Sefid, East Azerbaijan Province
- Dizaj-e Shur, East Azerbaijan Province
- Dizaj-e Talkhaj, East Azerbaijan Province

== Hamadan Province ==
- Dizaj, Hamadan

== Isfahan Province ==
- Dezej, Isfahan, in Dehaqan County

== Markazi Province ==
- Dizaj, Markazi

== Qazvin Province ==
- Dizaj, Qazvin

== Semnan Province ==
- Dizaj, Semnan

== West Azerbaijan Province ==
- Dizaj, Chaldoran, a village in Chaldoran County
- Dizaj-e Hatam Khan, a village in Chaypareh County
- Dizaj-e Aland, a village in Khoy County
- Dizaj-e Batchi, a village in Khoy County
- Dizaj Diz, a village in Khoy County
- Dizaj-e Herik, a village in Khoy County
- Dizaj-e Jamshid Khan, a village in Khoy County
- Dizaj-e Morteza Kandi, a village in Khoy County
- Dizaj, Naqadeh, a village in Naqadeh County
- Dizaj, Showt, a village in Showt County
- Dizaj, West Azerbaijan, a village in Urmia County
- Dizaj-e Dowl, a village in Urmia County
- Dizaj-e Naqaleh, a village in Urmia County
- Dizaj-e Fathi, a village in Urmia County
- Dizaj-e Rahim Pur, a village in Urmia County
- Dizaj-e Takyeh, a village in Urmia County
- Dizaj Rural District, in Khoy County
