= Parchi =

Parchi may refer to:

- Parchi, Azerbaijan
- Parchi, Iran
- Parchi, alternate name of Pakajik, Iran
- Parchi (film), a 2018 Pakistani film
