= Gurparan =

Gurparan گورپران
- Village
- Location within Iran
- Coordinates: 38°22′19″N 44°45′55″E
- Country: Iran
- Province: West Azerbaijan
- County: Khoy
- Bakhsh: Central
- Rural District: Rahal

Population (2006)
  - Total: 400
- Time zone: UTC+3:30 (IRST)
  - Summer (DST): UTC+4:30 (IRDT)

Gurparan (Persian: گورپران, also Romanized as Gūrparān; also known as Kūrparān) is a village in Rahal Rural District, in the Central District of Khoy County, West Azerbaijan Province, Iran. At the 2006 census, its population was 400, in 81 families.
