= Hajjat Kadeh =

Hajjat Kadeh حاجت كده
- Village
- Country: Iran
- Province: West Azerbaijan
- County: Khoy
- Bakhsh: Central
- Rural District: Dizaj

Population (2006)
  - Total: 160
- Time zone: UTC+3:30 (IRST)
  - Summer (DST): UTC+4:30 (IRDT)

Hajjat Kadeh (Persian: حاجت كده, also Romanized as Ḩājjat Kadeh) is a village in Dizaj Rural District, in the Central District of Khoy County, West Azerbaijan Province, Iran. At the 2006 census, its population was 160, in 29 families.
