= Buyla Push =

Buyla Push بويلاپوش
- Village
- Location within Iran
- Coordinates: 38°28′26″N 44°50′30″E
- Country: Iran
- Province: West Azerbaijan
- County: Khoy
- Bakhsh: Central
- Rural District: Rahal

Population (2006)
  - Total: 238
- Time zone: UTC+3:30 (IRST)
  - Summer (DST): UTC+4:30 (IRDT)

Buyla Push (Persian: بويلاپوش, also Romanized as Būylā Pūsh; also known as Pīleh Pūsh) is a village in Rahal Rural District, in the Central District of Khoy County, West Azerbaijan Province, Iran. At the 2006 census, its population was 238, in 40 families.
