= Daljeli =

Daljeli دلجلي
- Village
- Location within Iran
- Coordinates: 38°27′21″N 44°53′48″E
- Country: Iran
- Province: West Azerbaijan
- County: Khoy
- Bakhsh: Central
- Rural District: Rahal

Population (2006)
  - Total: 250
- Time zone: UTC+3:30 (IRST)
  - Summer (DST): UTC+4:30 (IRDT)

Daljeli (Persian: دلجلي, also Romanized as Daljelī; also known as Dāljelū and Deljelū) is a village in Rahal Rural District, in the Central District of Khoy County, West Azerbaijan Province, Iran. At the 2006 census, its population was 250, in 62 families.
