= Amir Beyg =

Amir Beyg اميربيگ
- Village
- Location within Iran
- Coordinates: 38°30′14″N 44°55′39″E
- Country: Iran
- Province: West Azerbaijan
- County: Khoy
- Bakhsh: Central
- Rural District: Rahal

Population (2006)
  - Total: 72
- Time zone: UTC+3:30 (IRST)
  - Summer (DST): UTC+4:30 (IRDT)

Amir Beyg (Persian: اميربيگ, also Romanized as Amīr Beyg; also known as Amīr Beyg-e Soflá) is a village in Rahal Rural District, in the Central District of Khoy County, West Azerbaijan Province, Iran. During the 2006 census, its population was 72, in 17 families.
