= Bulamaj =

Bulamaj بولاماج
- Village
- Location within Iran
- Coordinates: 38°31′56″N 44°59′13″E
- Country: Iran
- Province: West Azerbaijan
- County: Khoy
- Bakhsh: Central
- Rural District: Qarah Su

Population (2006)
  - Total: 399
- Time zone: UTC+3:30 (IRST)
  - Summer (DST): UTC+4:30 (IRDT)

Bulamaj (Persian: بولاماج, also Romanized as Būlāmāj; also known as Būlāmāch and Valāmāj) is a village in Qarah Su Rural District, in the Central District of Khoy County, West Azerbaijan Province, Iran. At the 2006 census, its population was 399, in 97 families.
