= Bagh-e Rajab =

Bagh-e Rajab باغ رجب
- Village
- Location within Iran
- Coordinates: 38°36′09″N 44°43′29″E
- Country: Iran
- Province: West Azerbaijan
- County: Khoy
- Bakhsh: Central
- Rural District: Firuraq

Population (2006)
  - Total: 127
- Time zone: UTC+3:30 (IRST)
  - Summer (DST): UTC+4:30 (IRDT)

Bagh-e Rajab (Persian: باغ رجب, also Romanized as Bāgh-e Rajab) is a village in Firuraq Rural District, in the Central District of Khoy County, West Azerbaijan Province, Iran. As of the 2006 census, its population was 127, in 23 families.
