= Aghdarreh =

Aghdarreh اغدره
- Village
- Location within Iran
- Coordinates: 38°43′15″N 44°49′45″E
- Country: Iran
- Province: West Azerbaijan
- County: Khoy
- Bakhsh: Central
- Rural District: Dizaj

Population (2006)
  - Total: 71
- Time zone: UTC+3:30 (IRST)
  - Summer (DST): UTC+4:30 (IRDT)

Aghdarreh (Persian: اغدره, also Romanized as Āghdarreh; also known as Āghdaraq) is a village in Dizaj Rural District, in the Central District of Khoy County, West Azerbaijan Province, Iran. At the 2006 census, its population was 71, in 11 families.
