= Gowharan =

Gowharan or Guharan (Persian: گوهران) may refer to:

- Gowharan, Hormozgan
- Gowharan, West Azerbaijan
- Gowharan District, in Hormozgan province
- Gowharan Rural District (Bashagard County), Hormozgan province
- Gowharan Rural District (Khoy County), West Azerbaijan province
