= Bakhtiaran =

Bakhtiaran بختياران
- Village
- Location within Iran
- Coordinates: 38°26′11″N 44°52′11″E
- Country: Iran
- Province: West Azerbaijan
- County: Khoy
- Bakhsh: Central
- Rural District: Rahal

Population (2006)
  - Total: 285
- Time zone: UTC+3:30 (IRST)
  - Summer (DST): UTC+4:30 (IRDT)

Bakhtiaran (Persian: بختياران, also Romanized as Bakhtīārān) is a village in Rahal Rural District, in the Central District of Khoy County, West Azerbaijan Province, Iran. At the 2006 census, its population was 285, from 62 families. In 2001, the total population was ~1,000,000.
