= Katenluy =

Katenluy (Persian: كتن لوي) may refer to:

- Katenluy-e Olya
- Katenluy-e Sofla
