= Hendovan =

Hendovan or Hendevan or Hendvan (Persian: هندوان) may refer to:

- Hendovan, Firuraq
- Hendevan, Rahal
