= Pir Musa =

Pir Musa or Pir Moosa (Persian: پيرموسي) may refer to:

- Pir Musa, Gilan
- Pir Musa, Khuzestan
- Pir Musa, West Azerbaijan
