= Koshkzar =

Koshkzar کشک زر
- Village
- Location within Iran
- Coordinates: 38°35′24″N 44°58′30″E
- Country: Iran
- Province: West Azerbaijan
- County: Khoy
- Bakhsh: Central
- Rural District: Dizaj

Population (2006)
  - Total: 154
- Time zone: UTC+3:30 (IRST)
  - Summer (DST): UTC+4:30 (IRDT)

Koshkzar (Persian: کشک زر; also known as Ādīāmān and Ādīyāmān) is a village in Dizaj Rural District, in the Central District of Khoy County, West Azerbaijan Province, Iran. At the 2006 census, its population was 154, in 32 families.
