= Sogotlu =

Sogotlu سگتلو
- Village
- Location within Iran
- Coordinates: 38°44′54″N 44°55′44″E
- Country: Iran
- Province: West Azerbaijan
- County: Khoy
- Bakhsh: Central
- Rural District: Dizaj

Population (2006)
  - Total: 80
- Time zone: UTC+3:30 (IRST)
  - Summer (DST): UTC+4:30 (IRDT)

Sogotlu (Persian: سگتلو, also Romanized as Sogotlū; also known as Sūchīdlū) is a village in Dizaj Rural District, in the Central District of Khoy County, West Azerbaijan Province, Iran. At the 2006 census, its population was 80, in 24 families.
