= Batchi =

Batchi بطچي
- Village
- Location within Iran
- Coordinates: 38°37′44″N 44°44′22″E
- Country: Iran
- Province: West Azerbaijan
- County: Khoy
- Bakhsh: Central
- Rural District: Firuraq

Population (2006)
  - Total: 56
- Time zone: UTC+3:30 (IRST)
  - Summer (DST): UTC+4:30 (IRDT)

Batchi (Persian: بطچي, also Romanized as Baţchī) is a village in Firuraq Rural District, in the Central District of Khoy County, West Azerbaijan province, Iran. At the 2006 census, its population was 56, in 15 families.
