= Var =

Var or VAR may refer to:

== Places ==
- Var (department), a department of France
- Var (river), France
- Vār, Iran, village in West Azerbaijan Province, Iran
- Var, Iran (disambiguation), other places in Iran
- Vár, a village in Obreja commune, Caraș-Severin County, Romania
- Var, a village in Jibou town, Sălaj County, Romania
- Var (Olt), a river in Harghita County, Romania
- VAR, the IATA airport code for Varna Airport, Bulgaria

== Mythology, arts and entertainment ==
- Vár, a goddess in Norse mythology
- Var or vara, an enclosure built by Jamshid (Yima) in Zoroastrian mythology
- Var (poetry), a type of Punjabi poem
- Var the Stick, a character of the Battle Circle trilogy by Piers Anthony

== Science and technology ==
- /var, a directory on Unix-like computer systems; see Filesystem Hierarchy Standard
- <var>...</var>, an HTML tag
- Vacuum arc remelting (VAR), a process for production of steel and special alloys
- Value-added reseller (VAR), an economic term primarily used in the technology industry
- Variable (computer science), in programming languages
- Variance, often represented Var(X), in statistics
- Variety (botany) (var.), a taxonomic rank
- Value at risk (VaR), in economics and finance
- Vector autoregression (VAR), an econometric method of analysis
- Visual Aural Radio Range (VAR), a radio navigation aid for aircraft
- Volt-ampere reactive (var), a unit which is the imaginary counterpart of the watt

== Sport ==
- Video assistant referee (VAR), in association football (soccer)
- Van Amersfoort Racing, an auto racing team based in the Netherlands

== People ==
- Vár Bentsdóttir Zachariasen (born 2002), Faroese handballer

== Other uses ==
- Vara, an old Spanish and Portuguese unit of length; see Spanish customary units
- Free Anti Revolutionary Party (Dutch: Vrije Anti Revolutionaire partij), a former political party

== See also ==
- Variable (disambiguation)
- Variant (disambiguation)
- Variety (disambiguation)
- Vara (disambiguation)
- Vars (disambiguation)
