= Alquyruq =

Alquyruq القويروق
- Village
- Location within Iran
- Coordinates: 38°46′39″N 44°51′40″E
- Country: Iran
- Province: West Azerbaijan
- County: Khoy
- Bakhsh: Central
- Rural District: Dizaj

Population (2006)
  - Total: 158
- Time zone: UTC+3:30 (IRST)
  - Summer (DST): UTC+4:30 (IRDT)

Alquyruq (Persian: القويروق, also Romanized as Ālqūyrūq) is a village in Dizaj Rural District, in the Central District of Khoy County, West Azerbaijan Province, Iran. In 2006, its population was 158, with 35 families.
