= Shivan Kandi =

Shivan Kandi شيوان كندي
- Village
- Location within Iran
- Coordinates: 38°39′00″N 44°43′17″E
- Country: Iran
- Province: West Azerbaijan
- County: Khoy
- Bakhsh: Central
- Rural District: Firuraq

Population (2006)
  - Total: 289
- Time zone: UTC+3:30 (IRST)
  - Summer (DST): UTC+4:30 (IRDT)

Shivan Kandi (Persian: شيوان كندي, also Romanized as Shīvān Kandī; also known as Shīvā Kandī) is a village in Firuraq Rural District, in the Central District of Khoy County, West Azerbaijan Province, Iran. At the 2006 census, its population was 289, in 48 families.
