= Dash Pasak =

Dash Pasak داش پسك
- Village
- Location within Iran
- Coordinates: 38°36′07″N 44°42′31″E
- Country: Iran
- Province: West Azerbaijan
- County: Khoy
- Bakhsh: Central
- Rural District: Firuraq

Population (2006)
  - Total: 50
- Time zone: UTC+3:30 (IRST)
  - Summer (DST): UTC+4:30 (IRDT)

Dash Pasak (Persian: داش پسك, also Romanized as Dāsh Pasak) is a village in Firuraq Rural District, in the Central District of Khoy County, West Azerbaijan Province, Iran. As shown by the 2006 census, its population was 50, divided into 14 families.
