= Shirin Kandi =

Shirin Kandi شيرين كندي
- Village
- Location within Iran
- Coordinates: 38°29′55″N 44°56′47″E
- Country: Iran
- Province: West Azerbaijan
- County: Khoy
- Bakhsh: Central
- Rural District: Qarah Su

Population (2006)
  - Total: 505
- Time zone: UTC+3:30 (IRST)
  - Summer (DST): UTC+4:30 (IRDT)

Shirin Kandi (Persian: شيرين كندي, also Romanized as Shīrīn Kandī; also known as Shīrīn Kandī-ye Jadīd) is a village in Qarah Su Rural District, in the Central District of Khoy County, West Azerbaijan Province, Iran. At the 2006 census, its population was 505, in 112 families.
