= Khvoyaman-e Jadid =

Khvoyaman-e Jadid خويمن جديد
- Village
- Location within Iran
- Coordinates: 38°28′37″N 44°54′40″E
- Country: Iran
- Province: West Azerbaijan
- County: Khoy
- Bakhsh: Central
- Rural District: Rahal

Population (2006)
  - Total: 112
- Time zone: UTC+3:30 (IRST)
  - Summer (DST): UTC+4:30 (IRDT)

Khvoyaman-e Jadid (Persian: خويمن جديد, also Romanized as Khvoyaman-e Jadīd and Khowyaman-e Jadīd) is a village in Rahal Rural District, in the Central District of Khoy County, West Azerbaijan Province, Iran. At the 2006 census, its population was 112, in 26 families.
