= Sufi Kandi =

Sufi Kandi صوفي كندي
- Village
- Location within Iran
- Coordinates: 38°37′00″N 44°41′24″E
- Country: Iran
- Province: West Azerbaijan
- County: Khoy
- Bakhsh: Central
- Rural District: Firuraq

Population (2006)
  - Total: 84
- Time zone: UTC+3:30 (IRST)
  - Summer (DST): UTC+4:30 (IRDT)

Sufi Kandi (Persian: صوفي كندي, also romanized as Şūfī Kandī) is a village in Firuraq Rural District, in the Central District of Khoy County, West Azerbaijan Province, Iran. At the 2006 census, its population was 84, in 22 families.
