= Chavoshqoli =

Village in West Azerbaijan province, Iran

Chavoshqoli Persian: چاوشقلي
- Village
- Location within Iran
- Coordinates: 38°30′28″N 44°52′17″E
- Country: Iran
- Province: West Azerbaijan
- County: Khoy
- District: Central
- Rural District: Rahal

Population (2016)
  - Total: 676
- Time zone: UTC+3:30 (IRST)

Chavoshqoli (Persian: چاوشقلي) (Note: Also romanized as Chāvosh Qolī and Chāvoshqolī) is a village in Rahal Rural District of the Central District in Khoy County, West Azerbaijan province, Iran.

== Demographics ==
=== Population ===
At the time of the 2006 National Census, the village's population was 578 in 120 households. The following census in 2011 counted 607 people in 171 households. The 2016 census measured the population of the village as 676 people in 199 households.
