= Seyyed Taj ol Din =

Village in West Azerbaijan province, Iran

Seyyed Taj ol Din Persian: سيدتاج الدين
- Village
- Location within Iran
- Coordinates: 38°21′40″N 45°02′21″E
- Country: Iran
- Province: West Azerbaijan
- County: Khoy
- District: Central
- Rural District: Qarah Su

Population (2016)
  - Total: 2,612
- Time zone: UTC+3:30 (IRST)

Seyyed Taj ol Din (Persian: سيدتاج الدين) (Note: Also romanized as Seyyed Tāj od Dīn and Seyyed Tāj ol Dīn; also known as Saiyid Hāji, Seid-Khadzhi, Seyyed Ḩājī, Seyyed Ḩājīm, Seyyed Ḩājīn, and Seyyed Ḩājjīn) is a village in Qarah Su Rural District of the Central District in Khoy County, West Azerbaijan province, Iran.

== Demographics ==
=== Population ===
At the time of the 2006 National Census, the village's population was 2,490 in 482 households. The following census in 2011 counted 2,575 people in 669 households. The 2016 census measured the population of the village as 2,612 people in 736 households. It was the most populous village in its rural district.
