= Fanai =

Village in West Azerbaijan province, Iran

Fanai Persian: فنايي
- Village
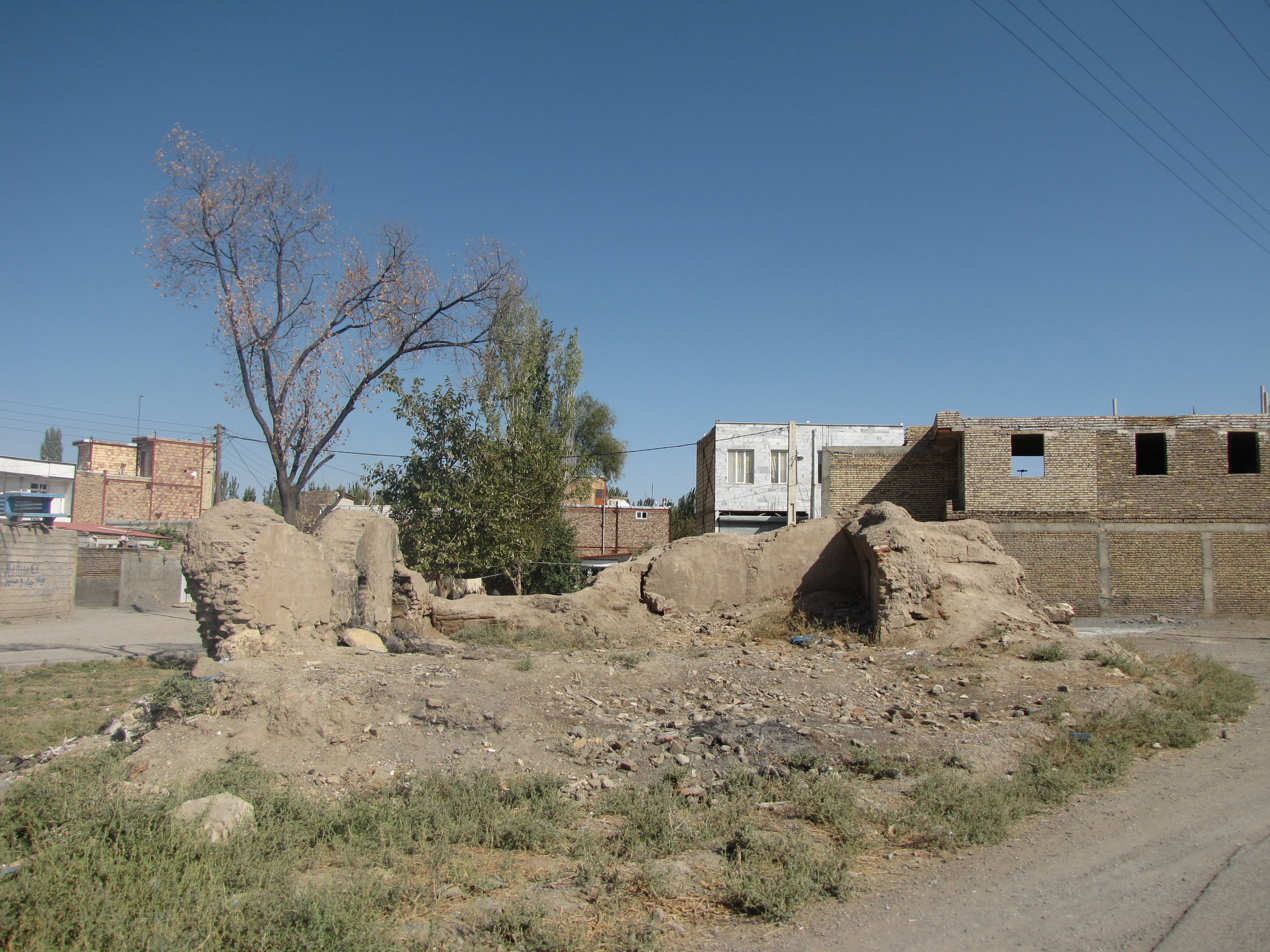
- Remains of Saint Sarkis Church in Fanai village

- Location within Iran
- Coordinates: 38°31′02″N 44°58′28″E
- Country: Iran
- Province: West Azerbaijan
- County: Khoy
- District: Central
- Rural District: Qarah Su

Population (2016)
  - Total: 723
- Time zone: UTC+3:30 (IRST)

Fanai (Persian: فنايي) (Note: Also romanized as Fanā'ī; in Armenian: Ֆանայի) is a village in Qarah Su Rural District of the Central District in Khoy County, West Azerbaijan province, Iran.

== Demographics ==
=== Population ===
At the time of the 2006 National Census, the village's population was 652 in 134 households. The following census in 2011 counted 609 people in 173 households. The 2016 census measured the population of the village as 723 people in 206 households.
