= Babakan, West Azerbaijan =

Village in West Azerbaijan province, Iran

Babakan Persian: بابكان
- Village
- Location within Iran
- Coordinates: 38°26′12″N 44°47′30″E
- Country: Iran
- Province: West Azerbaijan
- County: Khoy
- District: Central
- Rural District: Rahal

Population (2016)
  - Total: 505
- Time zone: UTC+3:30 (IRST)

Babakan (Persian: بابكان) (Note: Also romanized as Bābakān) is a village in Rahal Rural District of the Central District in Khoy County, West Azerbaijan province, Iran.

== Demographics ==
=== Population ===
At the time of the 2006 National Census, the village's population was 586 in 100 households. The following census in 2011 counted 599 people in 138 households. The 2016 census measured the population of the village as 505 people in 117 households.
