= Quruq =

Village in West Azerbaijan province, Iran

Quruq Persian: قوروق
- Village
- Location within Iran
- Coordinates: 38°27′46″N 44°55′45″E
- Country: Iran
- Province: West Azerbaijan
- County: Khoy
- District: Central
- Rural District: Rahal

Population (2016)
  - Total: 1,471
- Time zone: UTC+3:30 (IRST)

Quruq (Persian: قوروق) (Note: Also romanized as Qūrūq; also known as Ghooroogh, Kuruk, and Qorūq; Armenian: Ղորուղ)) is a village in, and the capital of, Rahal Rural District in the Central District of Khoy County, West Azerbaijan province, Iran.

== Demographics ==
=== Population ===
At the time of the 2006 National Census, the village's population was 1,487 in 396 households. The following census in 2011 counted 1,525 people in 446 households. The 2016 census measured the population of the village as 1,471 people in 464 households.
