= Parchi, Iran =

Parchi پارچي
- Village
- Location within Iran
- Coordinates: 38°37′17″N 44°57′50″E
- Country: Iran
- Province: West Azerbaijan
- County: Khoy
- Bakhsh: Central
- Rural District: Dizaj

Population (2006)
  - Total: 485
- Time zone: UTC+3:30 (IRST)
  - Summer (DST): UTC+4:30 (IRDT)

Parchi (Persian: پارچي, also Romanized as Pārchī) is a village in Dizaj Rural District, in the Central District of Khoy County, West Azerbaijan Province, Iran. As of the 2006 census, it had a population of 485, across 107 families.
