= Salkadeh =

Village in West Azerbaijan province, Iran

Salkadeh Persian: سعلكده
- Village
- Location within Iran
- Coordinates: 38°30′36″N 44°52′55″E
- Country: Iran
- Province: West Azerbaijan
- County: Khoy
- District: Central
- Rural District: Rahal

Population (2016)
  - Total: 1,058
- Time zone: UTC+3:30 (IRST)

Salkadeh (Persian: سعلكده) (Note: Also romanized as Sa‘lkadeh; also known as Sa‘lgadah) is a village in Rahal Rural District of the Central District in Khoy County, West Azerbaijan province, Iran.

== Demographics ==
=== Population ===
At the time of the 2006 National Census, the village's population was 979 in 206 households. The following census in 2011 counted 859 people in 242 households. The 2016 census measured the population of the village as 1,058 people in 331 households.
