= Hashieh Rud =

Village in West Azerbaijan province, Iran

Hashieh Rud Persian: حاشيه رود
- Village
- Location within Iran
- Coordinates: 38°34′16″N 45°04′03″E
- Country: Iran
- Province: West Azerbaijan
- County: Khoy
- District: Central
- Rural District: Gowharan

Population (2016)
  - Total: 1,381
- Time zone: UTC+3:30 (IRST)

Hashieh Rud (Persian: حاشيه رود) (Note: Also romanized as Ḩāshīeh Rūd, Hashiyeh Rood, Ḩāshīyeh Rūd, and Hāsheyeh Rūd; also known as Aaysharud, Ḩasharūd, Hasharut, Ḩāsheh Rud (حشه رود), and Hashtrūd) is a village in Gowharan Rural District of the Central District in Khoy County, West Azerbaijan province, Iran.

== Demographics ==
=== Population ===
At the time of the 2006 National Census, the village's population was 1,415 in 331 households. The following census in 2011 counted 1,336 people in 390 households. The 2016 census measured the population of the village as 1,381 people in 432 households.
