= Badalan, Iran =

Village in West Azerbaijan province, Iran

Badalan Persian: بدلان
- Village
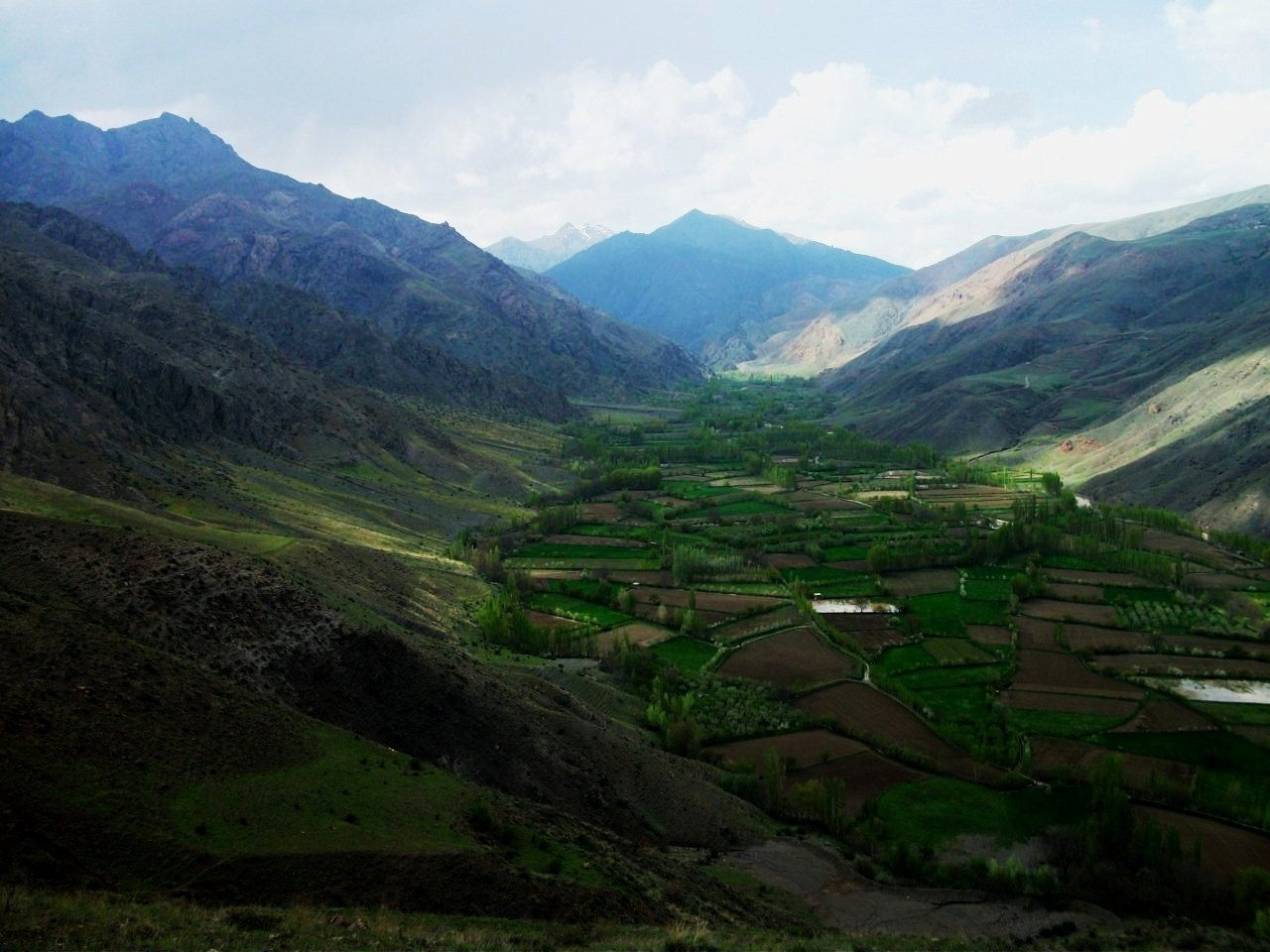

- Location within Iran
- Coordinates: 38°35′16″N 44°42′21″E
- Country: Iran
- Province: West Azerbaijan
- County: Khoy
- District: Central
- Rural District: Firuraq

Population (2016)
  - Total: 615
- Time zone: UTC+3:30 (IRST)

Badalan (Persian: بدلان) (Note: Also romanized as Badalān) is a village in Firuraq Rural District of the Central District in Khoy County, West Azerbaijan province, Iran.

== Demographics ==
=== Population ===
At the time of the 2006 National Census, the village's population was 569 in 110 households. The following census in 2011 counted 602 people in 171 households. The 2016 census measured the population of the village as 615 people in 194 households.
