= Qareh Shaban =

Village in West Azerbaijan province, Iran

Qareh Shaban Persian: قره شعبان
- Village
- Location within Iran
- Coordinates: 38°33′16″N 45°02′46″E
- Country: Iran
- Province: West Azerbaijan
- County: Khoy
- District: Central
- Rural District: Gowharan

Population (2016)
  - Total: 738
- Time zone: UTC+3:30 (IRST)

Qareh Shaban (Persian: قره شعبان) (Note: Also romanized as Qareh Sha‘bān; also known as Ghareh Sha’ban, Kara-Shaban, and Qara Shābān) is a village in Gowharan Rural District of the Central District in Khoy County, West Azerbaijan province, Iran.

== Demographics ==
=== Population ===
At the time of the 2006 National Census, the village's population was 705 in 175 households. The following census in 2011 counted 719 people in 210 households. The 2016 census measured the population of the village as 738 people in 237 households.
