= Qez Qaleh, Khoy =

Village in West Azerbaijan province, Iran

Qez Qaleh Persian: قزقلعه
- Village
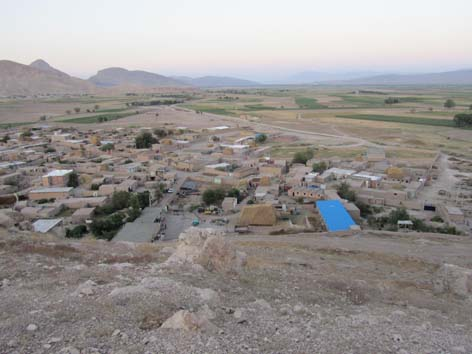
- The village of Qez Qaleh

- Location within Iran
- Coordinates: 38°38′55″N 45°00′54″E
- Country: Iran
- Province: West Azerbaijan
- County: Khoy
- District: Central
- Rural District: Dizaj

Population (2016)
  - Total: 716
- Time zone: UTC+3:30 (IRST)

Qez Qaleh (Persian: قزقلعه) (Note: Also romanized as Qez Qal‘eh; also known as Ghez Ghal’eh and Qiz Qal’eh) is a village in Dizaj Rural District of the Central District in Khoy County, West Azerbaijan province, Iran.

== Demographics ==
=== Population ===
At the time of the 2006 National Census, the village's population was 839 in 194 households. The following census in 2011 counted 839 people in 251 households. The 2016 census measured the population of the village as 716 people in 199 households.
