= Sarab, West Azerbaijan =

Village in West Azerbaijan province, Iran

Sarab Persian: سراب
- Village
- Location within Iran
- Coordinates: 38°36′22″N 44°59′19″E
- Country: Iran
- Province: West Azerbaijan
- County: Khoy
- District: Central
- Rural District: Dizaj

Population (2016)
  - Total: 858
- Time zone: UTC+3:30 (IRST)

Sarab (Persian: سراب) (Note: Also romanized as Sarāb) is a village in Dizaj Rural District of the Central District in Khoy County, West Azerbaijan province, Iran.

== Demographics ==
=== Population ===
At the time of the 2006 National Census, the village's population was 1,015 in 221 households. The following census in 2011 counted 971 people in 286 households. The 2016 census measured the population of the village as 858 people in 257 households.
