= Agri Bujaq =

Agri Bujaq or Agari Bujaq or Egri Bujaq (Persian: اگري بوجاق) may refer to:

- Agari Bujaq, Gilan
- Agri Bujaq, West Azerbaijan
