= Gowharan Rural District =

Gowharan Rural District (Persian: دهستان گوهران) may refer to:

- Gowharan Rural District (Bashagard County)
- Gowharan Rural District (Khoy County), West Azerbaijan province
