= Kurti, Iran =

Village in West Azerbaijan province, Iran

Kurti Persian: كورتي
- Village
- Location within Iran
- Coordinates: 38°31′06″N 44°52′43″E
- Country: Iran
- Province: West Azerbaijan
- County: Khoy
- District: Central
- Rural District: Rahal

Population (2016)
  - Total: 969
- Time zone: UTC+3:30 (IRST)

Kurti (Persian: كورتي) (Note: Also romanized as Kūrtī; also known as Gūtāy and Kūrtāy) is a village in Rahal Rural District of the Central District in Khoy County, West Azerbaijan province, Iran.

== Demographics ==
=== Population ===
At the time of the 2006 National Census, the village's population was 863 in 181 households. The following census in 2011 counted 783 people in 223 households. The 2016 census measured the population of the village as 969 people in 294 households.
