= Shur Ab, West Azerbaijan =

Village in West Azerbaijan province, Iran

Shur Ab Persian: شوراب
- Village
- Location within Iran
- Coordinates: 38°33′06″N 45°00′03″E
- Country: Iran
- Province: West Azerbaijan
- County: Khoy
- District: Central
- Rural District: Gowharan

Population (2016)
  - Total: 878
- Time zone: UTC+3:30 (IRST)

Shur Ab (Persian: شوراب) (Note: Also romanized as Shūr Āb and Shūrāb; also known as Shorokh, Shoruk, Showrūk, and Shūrek; in Armenian: Շորաւ) is a village in Gowharan Rural District of the Central District in Khoy County, West Azerbaijan province, Iran.

== Demographics ==
=== Population ===
At the time of the 2006 National Census, the village's population was 306 in 78 households. The following census in 2011 counted 601 people in 173 households. The 2016 census measured the population of the village as 878 people in 260 households.
