= Hendevan, Rahal =

Hendevan هندوان
- Village
- Location within Iran
- Coordinates: 38°27′05″N 44°54′18″E
- Country: Iran
- Province: West Azerbaijan
- County: Khoy
- Bakhsh: Central
- Rural District: Rahal

Population (2006)
  - Total: 327
- Time zone: UTC+3:30 (IRST)
  - Summer (DST): UTC+4:30 (IRDT)

Hendevan (Persian: هندوان, also Romanized as Hendevān) is a village in Rahal Rural District, in the Central District of Khoy County, West Azerbaijan Province, Iran. At the 2006 census, its population was 327, in 71 families.
