= Shur Bolagh, Khoy =

Village in West Azerbaijan province, Iran

Shur Bolagh Persian: شوربلاغ
- Village
- Location within Iran
- Coordinates: 38°23′50″N 44°56′21″E
- Country: Iran
- Province: West Azerbaijan
- County: Khoy
- District: Central
- Rural District: Qarah Su

Population (2016)
  - Total: 1,386
- Time zone: UTC+3:30 (IRST)

Shur Bolagh (Persian: شوربلاغ) (Note: Also romanized as Shūr Bolāgh) is a village in Qarah Su Rural District of the Central District in Khoy County, West Azerbaijan province, Iran.

== Demographics ==
=== Population ===
At the time of the 2006 National Census, the village's population was 1,182 in 215 households. The following census in 2011 counted 1,339 people in 309 households. The 2016 census measured the population of the village as 1,386 people in 333 households.
