= Esteran =

Village in West Azerbaijan province, Iran

Esteran Persian: استران
- Village
- Location within Iran
- Coordinates: 38°26′08″N 44°43′23″E
- Country: Iran
- Province: West Azerbaijan
- County: Khoy
- District: Central
- Rural District: Rahal

Population (2016)
  - Total: 1,203
- Time zone: UTC+3:30 (IRST)

Esteran (Persian: استران) (Note: Also romanized as Esterān) is a village in Rahal Rural District of the Central District in Khoy County, West Azerbaijan province, Iran.

== Demographics ==
=== Population ===
At the time of the 2006 National Census, the village's population was 1,196 in 221 households. The following census in 2011 counted 1,373 people in 351 households. The 2016 census measured the population of the village as 1,203 people in 302 households.
