= Akbarabad, West Azerbaijan =

Village in West Azerbaijan province, Iran

Akbarabad Persian: اكبراباد
- Village
- Location within Iran
- Coordinates: 38°34′39″N 44°57′49″E
- Country: Iran
- Province: West Azerbaijan
- County: Khoy
- District: Central
- Rural District: Dizaj

Population (2016)
  - Total: 1,312
- Time zone: UTC+3:30 (IRST)

Akbarabad (Persian: اكبراباد) (Note: Also romanized as Akbarābād) is a village in Dizaj Rural District of the Central District in Khoy County, West Azerbaijan province, Iran.

== Demographics ==
=== Population ===
At the time of the 2006 National Census, the village's population was 1,446 in 295 households. The following census in 2011 counted 1,473 people in 359 households. The 2016 census measured the population of the village as 1,312 people in 351 households.
