= Khandizaj =

Village in West Azerbaijan province, Iran

Khandizaj Persian: خان ديزج
- Village
- Location within Iran
- Coordinates: 38°26′13″N 44°50′57″E
- Country: Iran
- Province: West Azerbaijan
- County: Khoy
- District: Central
- Rural District: Rahal

Population (2016)
  - Total: 587
- Time zone: UTC+3:30 (IRST)

Khandizaj (Persian: خان ديزج) (Note: Also romanized as Khāndīzaj) is a village in Rahal Rural District of the Central District in Khoy County, West Azerbaijan province, Iran.

== Demographics ==
=== Population ===
At the time of the 2006 National Census, the village's population was 604 in 121 households. The following census in 2011 counted 625 people in 163 households. The 2016 census measured the population of the village as 587 people in 168 households.
