= Yazdekan =

Village in West Azerbaijan province, Iran

Yazdekan Persian: يزدكان
- Village
- Location within Iran
- Coordinates: 38°24′17″N 44°47′43″E
- Country: Iran
- Province: West Azerbaijan
- County: Khoy
- District: Central
- Rural District: Rahal

Population (2016)
  - Total: 2,437
- Time zone: UTC+3:30 (IRST)

Yazdekan (Persian: يزدكان) (Note: Also romanized as Yazdekān) is a village in Rahal Rural District of the Central District in Khoy County, West Azerbaijan province, Iran.

== Demographics ==
=== Population ===
At the time of the 2006 National Census, the village's population was 2,724 in 565 households. The following census in 2011 counted 2,993 people in 779 households. The 2016 census measured the population of the village as 2,437 people in 605 households. It was the most populous village in its rural district.
