= Katenluy-e Olya =

Katenluy-e Olya كتن لوي عليا
- Village
- Location within Iran
- Coordinates: 38°44′29″N 44°51′29″E
- Country: Iran
- Province: West Azerbaijan
- County: Khoy
- Bakhsh: Central
- Rural District: Dizaj

Population (2006)
  - Total: 42
- Time zone: UTC+3:30 (IRST)
  - Summer (DST): UTC+4:30 (IRDT)

Katenluy-e Olya (Persian: كتن لوي عليا, also Romanized as Katenlūy-e ‘Olyā; also known as Katenlūy-e Bālā) is a village in Dizaj Rural District, in the Central District of Khoy County, West Azerbaijan Province, Iran. At the 2006 census, its population was 42, in 10 families.
