= Qashqa Bolagh, West Azerbaijan =

Village in West Azerbaijan province, Iran

Qashqa Bolagh Persian: قشقابلاغ
- Village
- Location within Iran
- Coordinates: 38°31′31″N 44°44′09″E
- Country: Iran
- Province: West Azerbaijan
- County: Khoy
- District: Central
- Rural District: Firuraq

Population (2016)
  - Total: 429
- Time zone: UTC+3:30 (IRST)

Qashqa Bolagh (Persian: قشقابلاغ) (Note: Also romanized as Qashqā Bolāgh and Qāshqā Bolāgh) is a village in Firuraq Rural District of the Central District in Khoy County, West Azerbaijan province, Iran.

== Demographics ==
=== Population ===
At the time of the 2006 National Census, the village's population was 375 in 67 households. The following census in 2011 counted 424 people in 92 households. The 2016 census measured the population of the village as 429 people in 97 households.
