= Ezzatabad, Khoy =

Village in West Azerbaijan province, Iran

Ezzatabad Persian: عزت اباد
- Village
- Location within Iran
- Coordinates: 38°35′04″N 44°58′07″E
- Country: Iran
- Province: West Azerbaijan
- County: Khoy
- District: Central
- Rural District: Dizaj

Population (2016)
  - Total: 1,912
- Time zone: UTC+3:30 (IRST)

Ezzatabad (Persian: عزت اباد) (Note: Also romanized as ‘Ezzatābād; also known as Īzadābād and Makān Mastoqol (مکان مستقل)) is a village in Dizaj Rural District of the Central District in Khoy County, West Azerbaijan province, Iran.

== Demographics ==
=== Population ===
At the time of the 2006 National Census, the village's population was 1,442 in 229 households. The following census in 2011 counted 1,750 people in 394 households. The 2016 census measured the population of the village as 1,912 people in 450 households.
