= Zaviyeh-e Hasan Khan =

Village in West Azerbaijan province, Iran

Zaviyeh-e Hasan Khan Persian: زاويه حسن خان
- Village
- Location within Iran
- Coordinates: 38°33′40″N 44°52′42″E
- Country: Iran
- Province: West Azerbaijan
- County: Khoy
- District: Central
- Rural District: Firuraq

Population (2016)
  - Total: 1,311
- Time zone: UTC+3:30 (IRST)

Zaviyeh-e Hasan Khan (Persian: زاويه حسن خان) (Note: Also romanized as Zāvīyeh-e Ḩasan Khān) is a village in Firuraq Rural District of the Central District in Khoy County, West Azerbaijan province, Iran.

== Demographics ==
=== Population ===
At the time of the 2006 National Census, the village's population was 1,431 in 302 households. The following census in 2011 counted 1,585 people in 410 households. The 2016 census measured the population of the village as 1,790 people in 458 households.
