= Ahmadabad, Dizaj =

Village in West Azerbaijan province, Iran

Ahmadabad Persian: احمداباد
- Village
- Location within Iran
- Coordinates: 38°35′01″N 44°58′18″E
- Country: Iran
- Province: West Azerbaijan
- County: Khoy
- District: Central
- Rural District: Dizaj

Population (2016)
  - Total: 2,141
- Time zone: UTC+3:30 (IRST)

Ahmadabad (Persian: احمداباد) (Note: Also romanized as Aḩmadābād) is a village in Dizaj Rural District of the Central District in Khoy County, West Azerbaijan province, Iran.

== Demographics ==
=== Population ===
At the time of the 2006 National Census, the village's population was 1,159 in 209 households. The following census in 2011 counted 1,735 people in 389 households. The 2016 census measured the population of the village as 2,141 people in 515 households.
