= Pasak-e Sofla =

Village in West Azerbaijan province, Iran

Pasak-e Sofla Persian: پسك سفلي
- Village
- Location within Iran
- Coordinates: 38°33′40″N 44°48′08″E
- Country: Iran
- Province: West Azerbaijan
- County: Khoy
- District: Central
- Rural District: Firuraq

Population (2016)
  - Total: 2,126
- Time zone: UTC+3:30 (IRST)

Pasak-e Sofla (Persian: پسكسفلي) (Note: Also romanized as Pasak-e Soflá; also known as Pasak and Pasak-e Pā'īn) is a village in, and the capital of, Firuraq Rural District in the Central District of Khoy County, West Azerbaijan province, Iran.

== Demographics ==
=== Population ===
At the time of the 2006 National Census, the village's population was 1,944 in 428 households. The following census in 2011 counted 1,919 people in 600 households. The 2016 census measured the population of the village as 2,126 people in 667 households.
