= Saidabad, Khoy =

Village in West Azerbaijan province, Iran

Saidabad Persian: سعيداباد
- Village
- Location within Iran
- Coordinates: 38°33′52″N 45°01′22″E
- Country: Iran
- Province: West Azerbaijan
- County: Khoy
- District: Central
- Rural District: Gowharan

Population (2016)
  - Total: 3,255
- Time zone: UTC+3:30 (IRST)

Saidabad (Persian: سعيداباد, romanized: Sa‘īdābād) (Note: Also known as Saidāwar, Saidvān, Seydvān, and Seydanvar.) is a village in Gowharan Rural District of the Central District in Khoy County, West Azerbaijan province, Iran. It was the capital of Valdian Rural District in Ivughli District until its capital was transferred to the village of Mahlezan. It is inhabited by Armenians.

== Demographics ==
=== Population ===
At the time of the 2006 National Census, the village's population was 2,876 in 699 households. The following census in 2011 counted 3,272 people in 898 households. The 2016 census measured the population of the village as 3,255 people in 957 households. It was the most populous village in its rural district.

== Bibliography ==
- Amurian, Andre; Kasheff, Manouchehr (1986). "ARMENIANS OF MODERN IRAN". In Yarshater, Ehsan (ed.). Encyclopædia Iranica (Online ed.). Encyclopædia Iranica Foundation.
