= Rahal, Iran =

Village in West Azerbaijan province, Iran

Rahal Persian: رهال
- Village
- Location within Iran
- Coordinates: 38°28′41″N 44°52′26″E
- Country: Iran
- Province: West Azerbaijan
- County: Khoy
- District: Central
- Rural District: Rahal

Population (2016)
  - Total: 1,056
- Time zone: UTC+3:30 (IRST)

Rahal (Persian: رهال) (Note: Also romanized as Rahāl) is a village in Rahal Rural District of the Central District in Khoy County, West Azerbaijan province, Iran.

== Demographics ==
=== Population ===
At the time of the 2006 National Census, the village's population was 958 in 234 households. The following census in 2011 counted 1,021 people in 285 households. The 2016 census measured the population of the village as 1,056 people in 282 households.
