= Qeshlaq, West Azerbaijan =

Village in West Azerbaijan province, Iran

Qeshlaq Persian: قشلاق
- Village
- Location within Iran
- Coordinates: 38°37′46″N 44°48′36″E
- Country: Iran
- Province: West Azerbaijan
- County: Khoy
- District: Central
- Rural District: Firuraq

Population (2016)
  - Total: 1,311
- Time zone: UTC+3:30 (IRST)

Qeshlaq (Persian: قشلاق) (Note: Also romanized as Qeshlāq; also known as Qeshlāq-e Ferūraq and Qeshlāq-e Taqī Beyg) is a village in Firuraq Rural District of the Central District in Khoy County, West Azerbaijan province, Iran.

== Demographics ==
=== Population ===
At the time of the 2006 National Census, the village's population was 1,287 in 302 households. The following census in 2011 counted 1,324 people in 386 households. The 2016 census measured the population of the village as 1,311 people in 405 households.
