= Dizaj-e Batchi =

Dizaj-e Batchi ديزج بطچي
- Village
- Location within Iran
- Coordinates: 38°38′34″N 44°45′53″E
- Country: Iran
- Province: West Azerbaijan
- County: Khoy
- Bakhsh: Central
- Rural District: Firuraq

Population (2006)
  - Total: 173
- Time zone: UTC+3:30 (IRST)
  - Summer (DST): UTC+4:30 (IRDT)

Dizaj-e Batchi (Persian: ديزج بطچي, also Romanized as Dīzaj-e Baţchī; also known as Dīzaj, Dīzaj-e Pasak, Dīzaj Pasak, and Dīzeh) is a village in Firuraq Rural District, in the Central District of Khoy County, West Azerbaijan Province, Iran. At the 2006 census, its population was 173, in 46 families.
