= Khak Mardan =

Village in West Azerbaijan province, Iran

Khak Mardan Persian: خاكمردان
- Village
- Location within Iran
- Coordinates: 38°23′39″N 45°04′41″E
- Country: Iran
- Province: West Azerbaijan
- County: Khoy
- District: Central
- Rural District: Qarah Su

Population (2016)
  - Total: 622
- Time zone: UTC+3:30 (IRST)

Khak Mardan (Persian: خاكمردان) (Note: Also romanized as Khāk Mardān and Khākmardān; also known as Khaimar Dan, Khaymardan, and Kheymardan) is a village in Qarah Su Rural District of the Central District in Khoy County, West Azerbaijan province, Iran.

== Demographics ==
=== Population ===
At the time of the 2006 National Census, the village's population was 650 in 141 households. The following census in 2011 counted 643 people in 175 households. The 2016 census measured the population of the village as 622 people in 185 households.
