= Molla Jonud =

Village in West Azerbaijan province, Iran

Molla Jonud Persian: ملاجنود
- Village
- Location within Iran
- Coordinates: 38°23′26″N 44°55′21″E
- Country: Iran
- Province: West Azerbaijan
- County: Khoy
- District: Central
- Rural District: Qarah Su

Population (2016)
  - Total: 705
- Time zone: UTC+3:30 (IRST)

Molla Jonud (Persian: ملاجنود) (Note: Also romanized as Mollā Jonūd) is a village in Qarah Su Rural District of the Central District in Khoy County, West Azerbaijan province, Iran.

== Demographics ==
=== Population ===
At the time of the 2006 National Census, the village's population was 777 in 144 households. The following census in 2011 counted 771 people in 187 households. The 2016 census measured the population of the village as 705 people in 201 households.
