= Dizaj-e Herik =

Herik ديزج هريك
- Village
- Location within Iran
- Coordinates: 38°31′29″N 44°58′09″E
- Country: Iran
- Province: West Azerbaijan
- County: Khoy
- Bakhsh: Central
- Rural District: Qarah Su

Population (2006)
  - Total: 363
- Time zone: UTC+3:30 (IRST)
  - Summer (DST): UTC+4:30 (IRDT)

Dizaj-e Herik (Persian: ديزج هريك, also Romanized as Dīzaj-e Herīk; also known as Dīzaj-e Arīk; in Armenian: Դիզա) is a village in Qarah Su Rural District, in the Central District of Khoy County, West Azerbaijan Province, Iran. At the 2006 census, its population was 363, in 87 families.
