= Katenluy-e Sofla =

Katenluy-e Sofla كتن لوي سفلي
- Village
- Location within Iran
- Coordinates: 38°44′18″N 44°51′41″E
- Country: Iran
- Province: West Azerbaijan
- County: Khoy
- Bakhsh: Central
- Rural District: Dizaj

Population (2006)
  - Total: 26
- Time zone: UTC+3:30 (IRST)
  - Summer (DST): UTC+4:30 (IRDT)

Katenluy-e Sofla (Persian: كتن لوي سفلي, also Romanized as Katenlūy-e Soflá; also known as Katenlūy-e Pā'īn) is a village in Dizaj Rural District, in the Central District of Khoy County, West Azerbaijan Province, Iran. At the 2006 census, its population was 26, in 4 families.
