= Amineh Deh =

Village in West Azerbaijan province, Iran

Amineh Deh Persian: امينه ده
- Village
- Location within Iran
- Coordinates: 38°32′45″N 45°01′29″E
- Country: Iran
- Province: West Azerbaijan
- County: Khoy
- District: Central
- Rural District: Gowharan

Population (2016)
  - Total: 201
- Time zone: UTC+3:30 (IRST)

Amineh Deh (Persian: امينه ده) (Note: Also romanized as Amīneh Deh; also known as ‘Almadeh, Almadi, Almady, and Amnīeh Deh) is a village in Gowharan Rural District of the Central District in Khoy County, West Azerbaijan province, Iran.

== Demographics ==
=== Population ===
At the time of the 2006 National Census, the village's population was 234 in 44 households. The following census in 2011 counted 205 people in 54 households. The 2016 census measured the population of the village as 201 people in 64 households.
