= Kord Neshin =

Village in West Azerbaijan province, Iran

Kord Neshin Persian: كردنشين
- Village
- Location within Iran
- Coordinates: 38°35′33″N 45°01′42″E
- Country: Iran
- Province: West Azerbaijan
- County: Khoy
- District: Central
- Rural District: Gowharan

Population (2016)
  - Total: 527
- Time zone: UTC+3:30 (IRST)

Kord Neshin (Persian: كردنشين) (Note: Also romanized as Kord Neshīn; also known as Kord Eshin, Kord Īshīn, Kūrdashī, and Kyurdashin) is a village in Gowharan Rural District of the Central District in Khoy County, West Azerbaijan province, Iran.

== Demographics ==
=== Population ===
At the time of the 2006 National Census, the village's population was 525 in 129 households. The following census in 2011 counted 559 people in 145 households. The 2016 census measured the population of the village as 527 people in 157 households.
