= Azab, West Azerbaijan =

Village in West Azerbaijan province, Iran

Azab Persian: عذاب
- Village
- Location within Iran
- Coordinates: 38°27′47″N 44°57′41″E
- Country: Iran
- Province: West Azerbaijan
- County: Khoy
- District: Central
- Rural District: Qarah Su

Population (2016)
  - Total: 1,575
- Time zone: UTC+3:30 (IRST)

Azab (Persian: عذاب) (Note: Also romanized as ‘Az̄āb) is a village in Qarah Su Rural District of the Central District in Khoy County, West Azerbaijan province, Iran.

== Demographics ==
=== Population ===
At the time of the 2006 National Census, the village's population was 1,237 in 252 households. The following census in 2011 counted 1,378 people in 369 households. The 2016 census measured the population of the village as 1,575 people in 462 households.
