= Taglak =

Village in West Azerbaijan province, Iran

Taglak Persian: تگلك
- Village
- Location within Iran
- Coordinates: 38°26′39″N 44°55′52″E
- Country: Iran
- Province: West Azerbaijan
- County: Khoy
- District: Central
- Rural District: Rahal

Population (2016)
  - Total: 942
- Time zone: UTC+3:30 (IRST)

Taglak (Persian: تگلك) (Note: Also known as Taglag) is a village in Rahal Rural District of the Central District in Khoy County, West Azerbaijan province, Iran.

== Demographics ==
=== Population ===
At the time of the 2006 National Census, the village's population was 912 in 216 households. The following census in 2011 counted 895 people in 266 households. The 2016 census measured the population of the village as 942 people in 288 households.
