= Sarabdal =

Village in West Azerbaijan province, Iran

Sarabdal Persian: سرابدال
- Village
- Location within Iran
- Coordinates: 38°34′53″N 44°59′33″E
- Country: Iran
- Province: West Azerbaijan
- County: Khoy
- District: Central
- Rural District: Gowharan

Population (2016)
  - Total: 378
- Time zone: UTC+3:30 (IRST)

Sarabdal (Persian: سرابدال) (Note: Also romanized as Sarābdāl and Sarabdāl; also known as Tāzeh Kand) is a village in Gowharan Rural District of the Central District in Khoy County, West Azerbaijan province, Iran.

== Demographics ==
=== Population ===
At the time of the 2006 National Census, the village's population was 371 in 91 households. The following census in 2011 counted 392 people in 106 households. The 2016 census measured the population of the village as 378 people in 113 households.
