= Badalabad =

Village in West Azerbaijan province, Iran

Badalabad Persian: بدل اباد
- Village
- Location within Iran
- Coordinates: 38°34′16″N 44°55′33″E
- Country: Iran
- Province: West Azerbaijan
- County: Khoy
- District: Central
- Rural District: Dizaj

Population (2016)
  - Total: 9,256
- Time zone: UTC+3:30 (IRST)

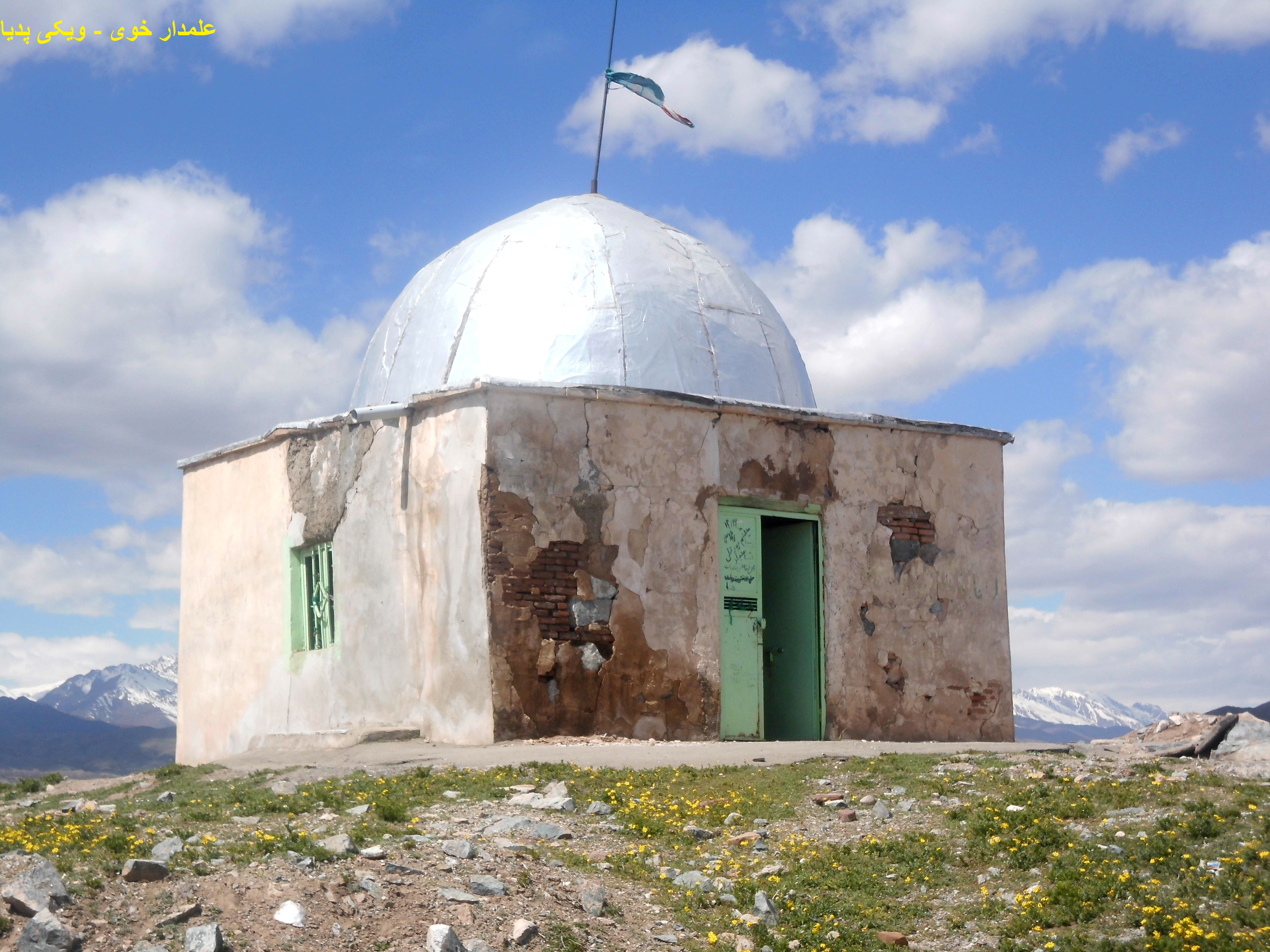

Badalabad (Persian: بدل اباد) (Note: Also romanized as Badalābād) is a village in Dizaj Rural District of the Central District in Khoy County, West Azerbaijan province, Iran.

== Demographics ==
=== Population ===
At the time of the 2006 National Census, the village's population was 6,725 in 1,503 households. The following census in 2011 counted 8,491 people in 2,203 households. The 2016 census measured the population of the village as 9,256 people in 2,581 households. It was the most populous village in its rural district.

== In literature ==
The 14th-century author Hamdallah Mustawfi mentioned it in his Nuzhat al-Qulub, as Badhalābād, as one of the "best-known" villages in the Khoy district.
