= Pir Musa, West Azerbaijan =

Village in West Azerbaijan province, Iran

Pir Musa Persian: پيرموسي
- Village
- Location within Iran
- Coordinates: 38°34′26″N 44°53′23″E
- Country: Iran
- Province: West Azerbaijan
- County: Khoy
- District: Central
- Rural District: Firuraq

Population (2016)
  - Total: 471
- Time zone: UTC+3:30 (IRST)

Pir Musa (Persian: پيرموسي) (Note: Also romanized as Pīr Mūsá) is a village in Firuraq Rural District of the Central District in Khoy County, West Azerbaijan province, Iran.

== Demographics ==
=== Population ===
At the time of the 2006 National Census, the village's population was 544 in 122 households. The following census in 2011 counted 529 people in 148 households. The 2016 census measured the population of the village as 471 people in 125 households.
