= Dizaj-e Morteza Khan =

Village in West Azerbaijan province, Iran

Dizaj-e Morteza Khan Persian: ديزج مرتضي خان
- Village
- Location within Iran
- Coordinates: 38°31′22″N 45°01′24″E
- Country: Iran
- Province: West Azerbaijan
- County: Khoy
- District: Central
- Rural District: Qarah Su

Population (2016)
  - Total: 817
- Time zone: UTC+3:30 (IRST)

Dizaj-e Morteza Khan (Persian: ديزج مرتضي خان) (Note: Also romanized as Dīzaj-e Morteẕā Khān; also known as Dizaj-e Morteza Kandi, Dīzaj-e Morteẕā Qolī Kandī and Mūsá Qolī Kandī (موسي قلي كندي)) is a village in Qarah Su Rural District of the Central District in Khoy County, West Azerbaijan province, Iran.

== Demographics ==
=== Population ===
At the time of the 2006 National Census, the village's population was 785 in 167 households. The following census in 2011 counted 823 people in 223 households. The 2016 census measured the population of the village as 817 people in 238 households.
