= Dizaj-e Jamshid Khan =

Village in West Azerbaijan province, Iran

Dizaj-e Jamshid Khan Persian: ديزج جمشيد خان
- Village
- Location within Iran
- Coordinates: 38°38′52″N 44°56′58″E
- Country: Iran
- Province: West Azerbaijan
- County: Khoy
- District: Central
- Rural District: Dizaj

Population (2016)
  - Total: 387
- Time zone: UTC+3:30 (IRST)

Dizaj-e Jamshid Khan (Persian: ديزج جمشيد خان) (Note: Also romanized as Dīzaj-e Jamshīd Khān) is a village in, and the capital of, Dizaj Rural District in the Central District of Khoy County, West Azerbaijan province, Iran.

== Demographics ==
=== Population ===
At the time of the 2006 National Census, the village's population was 498 in 102 households. The following census in 2011 counted 485 people in 144 households. The 2016 census measured the population of the village as 387 people in 112 households.
