= Firuraq =

City in West Azerbaijan province, Iran

Firuraq Persian: فيرورق
- City
- Location within Iran
- Coordinates: 38°34′52″N 44°50′00″E
- Country: Iran
- Province: West Azerbaijan
- County: Khoy
- District: Central

Population (2016)
  - Total: 9,190
- Time zone: UTC+3:30 (IRST)

Firuraq (Persian: فيرورق) (Note: Also romanized as Fīrūraq; also known as Farūraq, Firoozfanagh, Fīrūq, Forūraq, Pereh, Phairas Pira, and Pīr Forūzān; Armenian: Փէռա or Փեռոտակ)) is a city in the Central District of Khoy County, West Azerbaijan province, Iran.

== Demographics ==
=== Ethnicity ===
The city's inhabitants are predominantly Turk.

=== Population ===
At the time of the 2006 National Census, the city's population was 7,903 in 2,048 households. The following census in 2011 counted 8,837 people in 2,504 households. The 2016 census measured the population of the city as 9,190 people in 2,640 households.
