= Vars =

Vars, VARS may refer to:

== People ==
- Ellen Marie Vars (born 1957), Norwegian Sami author
- Henry Vars (1902–1977), Polish-American musician
- John de Vars Hazard (1888–1968)
- Láilá Susanne Vars (born 1976), Norwegian Sami lawyer and politician

== Places ==
- Kineh Vars, a village in Iran
- Vars, Ontario, a community within the city limits of Ottawa, Ontario, Canada
- Vars, Charente, a former commune in the department of Charente, France
- Vars, Hautes-Alpes, a commune in the department of Hautes-Alpes, France
  - Col de Vars, a high mountain pass between Vars and Alpes-de-Haute-Provence, France
- Vars, Haute-Saône, a commune in the department of Haute-Saône, France
- Vars-sur-Roseix, a commune in the department of Corrèze, France

== Other uses ==
- VARS (Valyl-tRNA synthetase), a human enzyme
- VARS, an organization from the Brave Saga Video games.

== See also ==
- Var (disambiguation)
