= Varin, Iran =

Varin (Persian: ورين), also called Var, in Iran, may refer to:

- Varin-e Bala
- Varin-e Pain

== See also ==
- Var, Iran
