= Gowharan, West Azerbaijan =

Village in West Azerbaijan province, Iran

Gowharan Persian: گوهران
- Village
- Location within Iran
- Coordinates: 38°34′22″N 45°01′16″E
- Country: Iran
- Province: West Azerbaijan
- County: Khoy
- District: Central
- Rural District: Gowharan

Population (2016)
  - Total: 2,557
- Time zone: UTC+3:30 (IRST)

Gowharan (Persian: گوهران) (Note: Also romanized as Gowharān; also known as Gohrwan and Gyuravan) is a village in, and the capital of, Gowharan Rural District in the Central District of Khoy County, West Azerbaijan province, Iran.

== Demographics ==
=== Population ===
At the time of the 2006 National Census, the village's population was 2,173 in 528 households. The following census in 2011 counted 2,449 people in 637 households. The 2016 census measured the population of the village as 2,557 people in 796 households.
