= Pakajik =

Village in West Azerbaijan province, Iran

Pakajik Persian: پكاجيك
- Village
- Location within Iran
- Coordinates: 38°35′48″N 45°00′40″E
- Country: Iran
- Province: West Azerbaijan
- County: Khoy
- District: Central
- Rural District: Gowharan

Population (2016)
  - Total: 1,246
- Time zone: UTC+3:30 (IRST)

Pakajik (Persian: پكاجيك) (Note: Also romanized as Pakājīk; also known as Bīā Jīk, Pagā Jīk, Pagājek, Parch, Pārchī, Paya Jīk, Payadzhik, Pega Jik, Pīkāchīk, and Yakāchīk) is a village in Gowharan Rural District of the Central District in Khoy County, West Azerbaijan province, Iran.

== Demographics ==
=== Population ===
At the time of the 2006 National Census, the village's population was 1,216 in 298 households. The following census in 2011 counted 1,266 people in 326 households. The 2016 census measured the population of the village as 1,246 people in 359 households.
