= Hendovan, Firuraq =

Village in West Azerbaijan province, Iran

Hendovan Persian: هندوان
- Village
- Location within Iran
- Coordinates: 38°31′03″N 44°39′31″E
- Country: Iran
- Province: West Azerbaijan
- County: Khoy
- District: Central
- Rural District: Firuraq

Population (2016)
  - Total: 1,149
- Time zone: UTC+3:30 (IRST)

Hendovan (Persian: هندوان) (Note: Also romanized as Hendovān and Hendvān) is a village in Firuraq Rural District of the Central District in Khoy County, West Azerbaijan province, Iran.

== Demographics ==
=== Population ===
At the time of the 2006 National Census, the village's population was 1,107 in 166 households. The following census in 2011 counted 1,215 people in 284 households. The 2016 census measured the population of the village as 1,149 people in 272 households.
