= Agri Bujaq, West Azerbaijan =

Village in West Azerbaijan province, Iran

Agri Bujaq Persian: اگري بوجاق
- Village
- Location within Iran
- Coordinates: 38°38′54″N 44°59′04″E
- Country: Iran
- Province: West Azerbaijan
- County: Khoy
- District: Central
- Rural District: Dizaj

Population (2016)
  - Total: 758
- Time zone: UTC+3:30 (IRST)

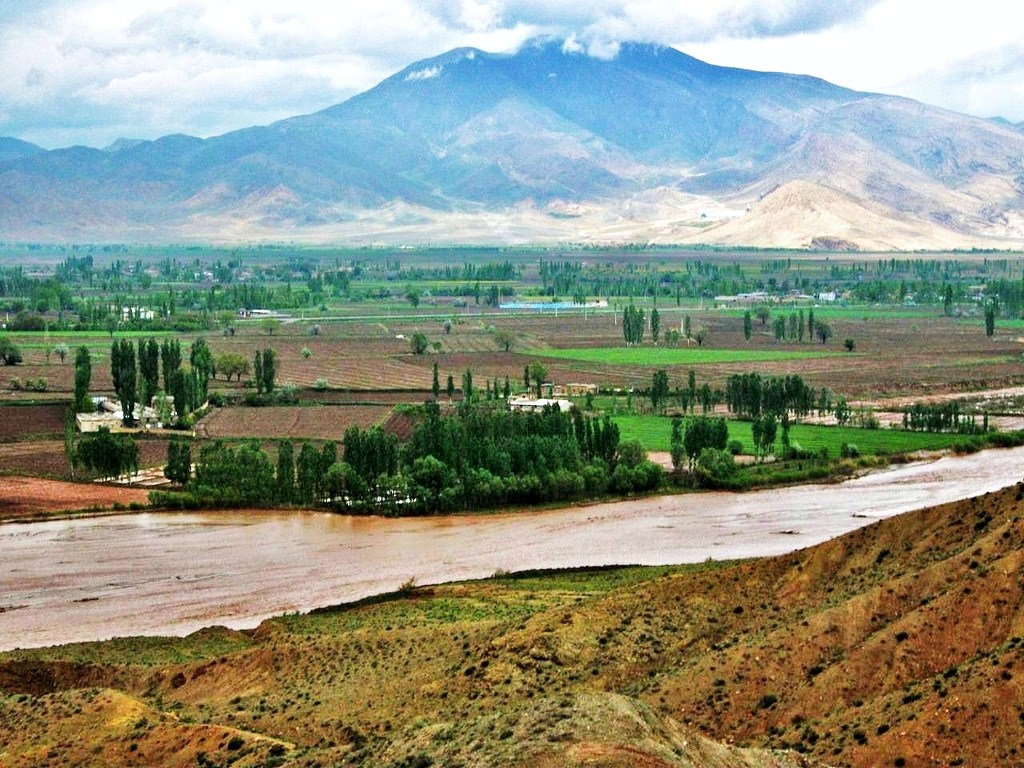

Agri Bujaq (Persian: اگري بوجاق) (Note: Also romanized as Agrī Būjāq; also known as Ara Būjāq, Ari Boochagh, Ayrī Būjāq, Ayrībūjāq, Bujakh, Īrībūjāq, and Yarī Būjāq) is a village in Dizaj Rural District of the Central District in Khoy County, West Azerbaijan province, Iran.

== Demographics ==
=== Population ===
At the time of the 2006 National Census, the village's population was 945 in 191 households. The following census in 2011 counted 932 people in 242 households. The 2016 census measured the population of the village as 758 people in 206 households.
