= Dizaj-e Safar Ali =

Dizaj-e Safar Ali ديزج صفرعلي
- Village
- Location within Iran
- Coordinates: 38°30′45″N 46°41′29″E
- Country: Iran
- Province: East Azerbaijan
- County: Varzaqan
- Bakhsh: Central
- Rural District: Ozomdel-e Jonubi

Population (2006)
  - Total: 495
- Time zone: UTC+3:30 (IRST)
  - Summer (DST): UTC+4:30 (IRDT)

Dizaj-e Safar Ali (Persian: ديزج صفرعلي, also Romanized as Dīzaj-e Şafar ‘Alī and Dīzaj Şafar ‘Alī; also known as Dizach and Dīzaj) is a village in Ozomdel-e Jonubi Rural District, in the Central District of Varzaqan County, East Azerbaijan Province, Iran. At the 2006 census, its population was 495, in 115 families.
