= Dizaj-e Talkhaj =

Dizaj-e Talkhaj ديزج تلخاج
- Village
- Location within Iran
- Coordinates: 38°25′26″N 47°03′52″E
- Country: Iran
- Province: East Azerbaijan
- County: Ahar
- Bakhsh: Central
- Rural District: Bozkosh

Population (2006)
  - Total: 36
- Time zone: UTC+3:30 (IRST)
  - Summer (DST): UTC+4:30 (IRDT)

Dizaj-e Talkhaj (Persian: ديزج تلخاج, also Romanized as Dīzaj-e Talkhāj) is a village in Bozkosh Rural District, in the Central District of Ahar County, East Azerbaijan Province, Iran. At the 2006 census, its population was 36, in 7 families.
