= Dizaj, Hamadan =

Dizaj ديزج
- Village
- Location within Iran
- Coordinates: 34°48′44″N 49°05′50″E
- Country: Iran
- Province: Hamadan
- County: Hamadan
- Bakhsh: Shara
- Rural District: Jeyhun Dasht

Population (2006)
  - Total: 407
- Time zone: UTC+3:30 (IRST)
  - Summer (DST): UTC+4:30 (IRDT)

Dizaj (Persian: ديزج, also Romanized as Dīzaj; also known as Dīzāch) is a village in Jeyhun Dasht Rural District, Shara District, Hamadan County, Hamadan Province, Iran. At the 2006 census, its population was 407, in 89 families.
