= Dizaj-e Shur =

Dizaj-e Shur ديزج شور
- Village
- Location within Iran
- Coordinates: 38°00′19″N 47°17′12″E
- Country: Iran
- Province: East Azerbaijan
- County: Sarab
- Bakhsh: Mehraban
- Rural District: Ardalan

Population (2006)
  - Total: 15
- Time zone: UTC+3:30 (IRST)
  - Summer (DST): UTC+4:30 (IRDT)

Dizaj-e Shur (Persian: ديزج شور, also Romanized as Dīzaj-e Shūr; also known as Dīzaj) is a village in Ardalan Rural District, Mehraban District, Sarab County, East Azerbaijan Province, Iran. At the 2006 census, its population was 15, in 4 families.
