= Dizaj-e Jalu =

Dizaj-e Jalu ديزج جالو
- Village
- Location within Iran
- Coordinates: 38°28′13″N 47°06′40″E
- Country: Iran
- Province: East Azerbaijan
- County: Ahar
- Bakhsh: Central
- Rural District: Bozkosh

Population (2006)
  - Total: 197
- Time zone: UTC+3:30 (IRST)
  - Summer (DST): UTC+4:30 (IRDT)

Dizaj-e Jalu (Persian: ديزج جالو, also Romanized as Dīzaj-e Jālū; also known as Dīzaj-e Chālū) is a village in Bozkosh Rural District, in the Central District of Ahar County, East Azerbaijan Province, Iran. At the 2006 census, its population was 197, in 37 families.
