= Pir Musa, Khuzestan =

Pir Musa پيرموسي
- Village
- Location within Iran
- Coordinates: 31°32′13″N 49°42′34″E
- Country: Iran
- Province: Khuzestan
- County: Bagh-e Malek
- Bakhsh: Central
- Rural District: Rud Zard

Population (2006)
  - Total: 429
- Time zone: UTC+3:30 (IRST)
  - Summer (DST): UTC+4:30 (IRDT)

Pir Musa (Persian: پيرموسي, also Romanized as Pīr Mūsá) is a village in Rud Zard Rural District, in the Central District of Bagh-e Malek County, Khuzestan Province, Iran. At the 2006 census, its population was 429, in 90 families.
