= Agh Dizaj =

Agh Dizaj اغديزج
- Village
- Location within Iran
- Coordinates: 39°13′46″N 44°16′55″E
- Country: Iran
- Province: West Azerbaijan
- County: Chaldoran
- Bakhsh: Central
- Rural District: Chaldoran-e Shomali

Population (2006)
  - Total: 49
- Time zone: UTC+3:30 (IRST)
  - Summer (DST): UTC+4:30 (IRDT)

Agh Dizaj (Persian: اغديزج, also Romanized as Āgh Dīzaj; also known as Dīzaj) is a village in Chaldoran-e Shomali Rural District, in the Central District of Chaldoran County, West Azerbaijan Province, Iran. At the 2006 census, its population was 49, in 11 families.
