= Var, Iran =

Village in West Azerbaijan province, Iran

Var Persian: وار
- Village
- Location within Iran
- Coordinates: 38°31′51″N 44°48′28″E
- Country: Iran
- Province: West Azerbaijan
- County: Khoy
- District: Central
- Rural District: Firuraq

Population (2016)
  - Total: 4,808
- Time zone: UTC+3:30 (IRST)

Var (Persian: وار, romanized: Vār) is a village in Firuraq Rural District of the Central District in Khoy County, West Azerbaijan province, Iran. It is inhabited by Armenians.

== Demographics ==
=== Population ===
At the time of the 2006 National Census, the village's population was 4,271 in 781 households. The following census in 2011 counted 4,620 people in 1,263 households. The 2016 census measured the population of the village as 4,808 people in 1,446 households. It was the most populous village in its rural district.

== Bibliography ==
- Amurian, Andre; Kasheff, Manouchehr (1986). "ARMENIANS OF MODERN IRAN". In Yarshater, Ehsan (ed.). Encyclopædia Iranica (Online ed.). Encyclopædia Iranica Foundation.
