= Dizaj Diz =

City in West Azerbaijan province, Iran

Dizaj Diz Persian: ديزج ديز
- City
- Location within Iran
- Coordinates: 38°27′44″N 45°01′33″E
- Country: Iran
- Province: West Azerbaijan
- County: Khoy
- District: Central
- Established as a city: 2007

Population (2016)
  - Total: 8,282
- Time zone: UTC+3:30 (IRST)

Dizaj Diz (Persian: ديزج ديز) (Note: Also romanized as Dīzaj Dīz; also known as Dizadiz) is a city in the Central District of Khoy County, West Azerbaijan province, Iran, serving as the administrative center for Qarah Su Rural District.

== Demographics ==
=== Population ===
At the time of the 2006 National Census, Dizaj Diz's population was 7,527 in 1,486 households, when it was a village in Qarah Su Rural District. The following census in 2011 counted 7,896 people in 2,115 households, by which time the village had been converted to a city. The 2016 census measured the population of the city as 8,282 people in 2,364 households.
