= Dizaj, Meyaneh =

Dizaj ديزج
- Village
- Location within Iran
- Coordinates: 37°38′20″N 47°49′36″E
- Country: Iran
- Province: East Azerbaijan
- County: Meyaneh
- Bakhsh: Kandovan
- Rural District: Kandovan

Population (2006)
  - Total: 172
- Time zone: UTC+3:30 (IRST)
  - Summer (DST): UTC+4:30 (IRDT)

Dizaj (Persian: ديزج, also Romanized as Dīzaj) is a village in Kandovan Rural District, Kandovan District, Meyaneh County, East Azerbaijan Province, Iran. At the 2006 census, its population was 172, in 41 families.
