= Dizaj-e Qorban =

Dizaj-e Qorban ديزج قربان
- Village
- Location within Iran
- Coordinates: 38°39′54″N 45°33′31″E
- Country: Iran
- Province: East Azerbaijan
- County: Marand
- Bakhsh: Central
- Rural District: Harzandat-e Gharbi

Population (2006)
  - Total: 957
- Time zone: UTC+3:30 (IRST)
  - Summer (DST): UTC+4:30 (IRDT)

Dizaj-e Qorban (Persian: ديزج قربان, also Romanized as Dīzaj-e Qorbān and Dīzajqorbān) is a village in Harzandat-e Gharbi Rural District, in the Central District of Marand County, East Azerbaijan Province, Iran. As of the 2006 census, its population was 957, in 262 families.
