= Dizaj Azim =

Dizaj Azim ديزج عظيم
- Village
- Location within Iran
- Coordinates: 37°58′11″N 47°31′23″E
- Country: Iran
- Province: East Azerbaijan
- County: Sarab
- Bakhsh: Central
- Rural District: Razliq

Population (2006)
  - Total: 36
- Time zone: UTC+3:30 (IRST)
  - Summer (DST): UTC+4:30 (IRDT)

Dizaj Azim (Persian: ديزج عظيم, also Romanized as Dīzaj ‘Az̧īm) is a village in the Razliq Rural District, in the Central District of Sarab County, East Azerbaijan Province, Iran. At the 2006 census, its population was 36, from 10 families.
