= Dizaj-e Naqaleh =

Dizaj-e Naqaleh ديزج نقاله
- Village
- Location within Iran
- Coordinates: 37°33′23″N 45°14′16″E
- Country: Iran
- Province: West Azerbaijan
- County: Urmia
- Bakhsh: Central
- Rural District: Bakeshluchay

Population (2006)
  - Total: 22
- Time zone: UTC+3:30 (IRST)
  - Summer (DST): UTC+4:30 (IRDT)

Dizaj-e Naqaleh (Persian: ديزج نقاله, also Romanized as Dīzaj-e Naqāleh; also known as Dīzaj-e Taqāleh) is a village in Bakeshluchay Rural District, in the Central District of Urmia County, West Azerbaijan Province, Iran. At the 2006 census, its population was 22, in 6 families.
