= Dizaj-e Mir Homay =

Dizaj-e Mir Homay ديزج ميرهماي
- Village
- Location within Iran
- Coordinates: 38°02′00″N 47°33′00″E
- Country: Iran
- Province: East Azerbaijan
- County: Sarab
- Bakhsh: Central
- Rural District: Razliq

Population (2006)
  - Total: 15
- Time zone: UTC+3:30 (IRST)
  - Summer (DST): UTC+4:30 (IRDT)

Dizaj-e Mir Homay (Persian: ديزج ميرهماي, also Romanized as Dīzaj-e Mīr Homāy; also known as Homāyābād and Homāy) is a village in Razliq Rural District, in the Central District of Sarab County, East Azerbaijan Province, Iran. At the 2006 census, its population was 15, in 5 families.
