= Dizaj-e Sefid =

Dizaj-e Sefid ديزج سفيد
- Village
- Location within Iran
- Coordinates: 38°02′54″N 47°33′37″E
- Country: Iran
- Province: East Azerbaijan
- County: Sarab
- Bakhsh: Central
- Rural District: Razliq

Population (2006)
  - Total: 70
- Time zone: UTC+3:30 (IRST)
  - Summer (DST): UTC+4:30 (IRDT)

Dizaj-e Sefid (Persian: ديزج سفيد, also Romanized as Dīzaj-e Sefīd; also known as Dīzas-e Sefīd) is a village that is located in Razliq Rural District, in the Central District of Sarab County, East Azerbaijan Province, Iran. At the 2006 census, its population was 70, in 10 families.
