= Dizaj-e Fathi =

Dizaj-e Fathi ديزج فتحي
- Village
- Location within Iran
- Coordinates: 37°23′52″N 45°04′24″E
- Country: Iran
- Province: West Azerbaijan
- County: Urmia
- Bakhsh: Central
- Rural District: Baranduz

Population (2006)
  - Total: 93
- Time zone: UTC+3:30 (IRST)
  - Summer (DST): UTC+4:30 (IRDT)

Dizaj-e Fathi (Persian: ديزج فتحي, also Romanized as Dīzaj-e Fatḩī) is a village in Baranduz Rural District, in the Central District of Urmia County, West Azerbaijan Province, Iran. At the 2006 census, its population was 93, in 19 families. The village is populated by Azerbaijanians.
