= Dizaj-e Rahim Pur =

Dizaj-e Rahim Pur ديزج رحيم پور
- Village
- Location within Iran
- Coordinates: 37°24′34″N 45°06′15″E
- Country: Iran
- Province: West Azerbaijan
- County: Urmia
- Bakhsh: Central
- Rural District: Baranduz

Population (2006)
  - Total: 113
- Time zone: UTC+3:30 (IRST)
  - Summer (DST): UTC+4:30 (IRDT)

Dizaj-e Rahim Pur (Persian: ديزج رحيم پور, also Romanized as Dīzaj-e Raḩīm Pūr and Dīzaj-e Raḩīmpūr) is a village in Baranduz Rural District, in the Central District of Urmia County, West Azerbaijan Province, Iran. At the 2006 census, its population was 113, in 28 families.
