= Gowharan Rural District (Khoy County) =

Rural district in West Azerbaijan province, Iran

Gowharan Rural District Persian: دهستان گوهران
- Rural District
- Location within Iran
- Coordinates: 38°34′N 45°02′E
- Country: Iran
- Province: West Azerbaijan
- County: Khoy
- District: Central
- Established: 1996
- Capital: Gowharan

Population (2016)
  - Total: 11,161
- Time zone: UTC+3:30 (IRST)

Gowharan Rural District (Persian: دهستان گوهران) is in the Central District of Khoy County, West Azerbaijan province, Iran. Its capital is the village of Gowharan.

== Demographics ==
=== Population ===
At the time of the 2006 National Census, the rural district's population was 9,821 in 2,373 households. There were 10,799 inhabitants in 2,939 households at the following census of 2011. The 2016 census measured the population of the rural district as 11,161 in 3,375 households. The most populous of its 10 villages was Saidabad, with 3,255 people.

=== Other villages in the rural district ===
- Amineh Deh
- Hashieh Rud
- Kord Neshin
- Pakajik
- Qareh Shaban
- Sarabdal
- Shur Ab
