= Qarah Su Rural District (Khoy County) =

Rural district in West Azerbaijan province, Iran

Qarah Su Rural District Persian: دهستان قرهسو
- Rural District
- Location within Iran
- Coordinates: 38°26′N 45°04′E
- Country: Iran
- Province: West Azerbaijan
- County: Khoy
- District: Central
- Established: 1987
- Capital: Dizaj Diz

Population (2016)
  - Total: 10,271
- Time zone: UTC+3:30 (IRST)

Qarah Su Rural District (Persian: دهستان قرهسو) is in the Central District of Khoy County, West Azerbaijan province, Iran. It is administered from the city of Dizaj Diz.

== Demographics ==
=== Population ===
At the time of the 2006 National Census, the rural district's population was 17,600 in 3,531 households. There were 9,977 inhabitants in 2,610 households at the following census of 2011. The 2016 census measured the population of the rural district as 10,271 in 2,891 households. The most populous of its 34 villages was Seyyed Taj ol Din, with 2,612 people.

=== Other villages in the rural district ===
- Azab
- Dizaj-e Morteza Khan
- Fanai
- Khak Mardan
- Molla Jonud
- Shur Bolagh
