= Firuraq Rural District =

Rural district in West Azerbaijan province, Iran

Firuraq Rural District Persian: دهستان فيرورق
- Rural District
- Location within Iran
- Coordinates: 38°35′N 44°42′E
- Country: Iran
- Province: West Azerbaijan
- County: Khoy
- District: Central
- Established: 1987
- Capital: Pasak-e Sofla

Population (2016)
  - Total: 14,219
- Time zone: UTC+3:30 (IRST)

Firuraq Rural District (Persian: دهستان فيرورق) is in the Central District of Khoy County, West Azerbaijan province, Iran. Its capital is the village of Pasak-e Sofla.

== Demographics ==
=== Population ===
At the time of the 2006 National Census, the rural district's population was 13,116 in 2,590 households. There were 13,708 inhabitants in 3,695 households at the following census of 2011. The 2016 census measured the population of the rural district as 14,219 in 4,059 households. The most populous of its 26 villages was Var, with 4,808 people.

=== Other villages in the rural district ===
- Badalan
- Hendovan
- Pir Musa
- Qashqa Bolagh
- Qeshlaq
- Zaviyeh-e Hasan Khan
