= Rahal Rural District =

Rural district in West Azerbaijan province, Iran

Rahal Rural District Persian: دهستان رهال
- Rural District
- Location within Iran
- Coordinates: 38°26′N 44°48′E
- Country: Iran
- Province: West Azerbaijan
- County: Khoy
- District: Central
- Established: 1987
- Capital: Quruq

Population (2016)
  - Total: 16,620
- Time zone: UTC+3:30 (IRST)

Rahal Rural District (Persian: دهستان رهال) is in the Central District of Khoy County, West Azerbaijan province, Iran. Its capital is the village of Quruq.

== Demographics ==
=== Population ===
At the time of the 2006 National Census, the rural district's population was 16,190 in 3,500 households. There were 16,897 inhabitants in 4,574 households at the following census of 2011. The 2016 census measured the population of the rural district as 16,620 in 4,669 households. The most populous of its 53 villages was Yazdekan, with 2,437 people.

=== Other villages in the rural district ===
- Babakan
- Chavoshqoli
- Esteran
- Khandizaj
- Kurti
- Rahal
- Salkadeh
- Taglak
