= Dizaj Rural District =

Rural district in West Azerbaijan province, Iran

Dizaj Rural District Persian: دهستان ديزج
- Rural District
- Location within Iran
- Coordinates: 38°40′N 44°53′E
- Country: Iran
- Province: West Azerbaijan
- County: Khoy
- District: Central
- Established: 1987
- Capital: Dizaj-e Jamshid Khan

Population (2016)
  - Total: 19,681
- Time zone: UTC+3:30 (IRST)

Dizaj Rural District (Persian: دهستان ديزج) is in the Central District of Khoy County, West Azerbaijan province, Iran. Its capital is the village of Dizaj-e Jamshid Khan.

== Demographics ==
=== Population ===
At the time of the 2006 National Census, the rural district's population was 17,516 in 3,673 households. There were 19,493 inhabitants in 5,019 households at the following census of 2011. The 2016 census measured the population of the rural district as 19,681 in 5,380 households. The most populous of its 44 villages was Badalabad, with 9,256 people.

=== Other villages in the rural district ===
- Agri Bujaq
- Ahmadabad
- Akbarabad
- Ezzatabad
- Qez Qaleh
- Sarab
