= Central District (Khoy County) =

District in West Azerbaijan province, Iran

Central District (Khoy County) Persian: بخش مرکزی شهرستان خوی
- District
- Location within Iran
- Coordinates: 38°34′N 44°53′E
- Country: Iran
- Province: West Azerbaijan
- County: Khoy
- Capital: Khoy

Population (2016)
  - Total: 288,269
- Time zone: UTC+3:30 (IRST)

The Central District of Khoy County (Persian: بخش مرکزی شهرستان خوی) is in West Azerbaijan province, Iran. Its capital is the city of Khoy.

== History ==
In 2007, the village of Dizaj Diz was converted to a city.

== Demographics ==
=== Population ===
At the time of the 2006 census, the district's population was 260,854 in 62,805 households. The following census in 2011 counted 288,565 people in 80,605 households. The 2016 census measured the population of the district as 288,269 inhabitants in 85,342 households.

=== Administrative divisions ===
Central District (Khoy County) Population
Administrative Divisions	2006	2011	2016
Dizaj RD	17,516	19,493	19,681
Firuraq RD	13,116	13,708	14,219
Gowharan RD	9,821	10,799	11,161
Qarah Su RD	17,600	9,977	10,271
Rahal RD	16,190	16,897	16,620
Dizaj Diz (city)		7,896	8,282
Firuraq (city)	7,903	8,837	9,190
Khoy (city)	178,708	200,958	198,845
Total	260,854	288,565	288,269
RD = Rural District
