= Sarab, East Azerbaijan =

City in East Azerbaijan province, Iran

Sarab Persian: سراب
- City
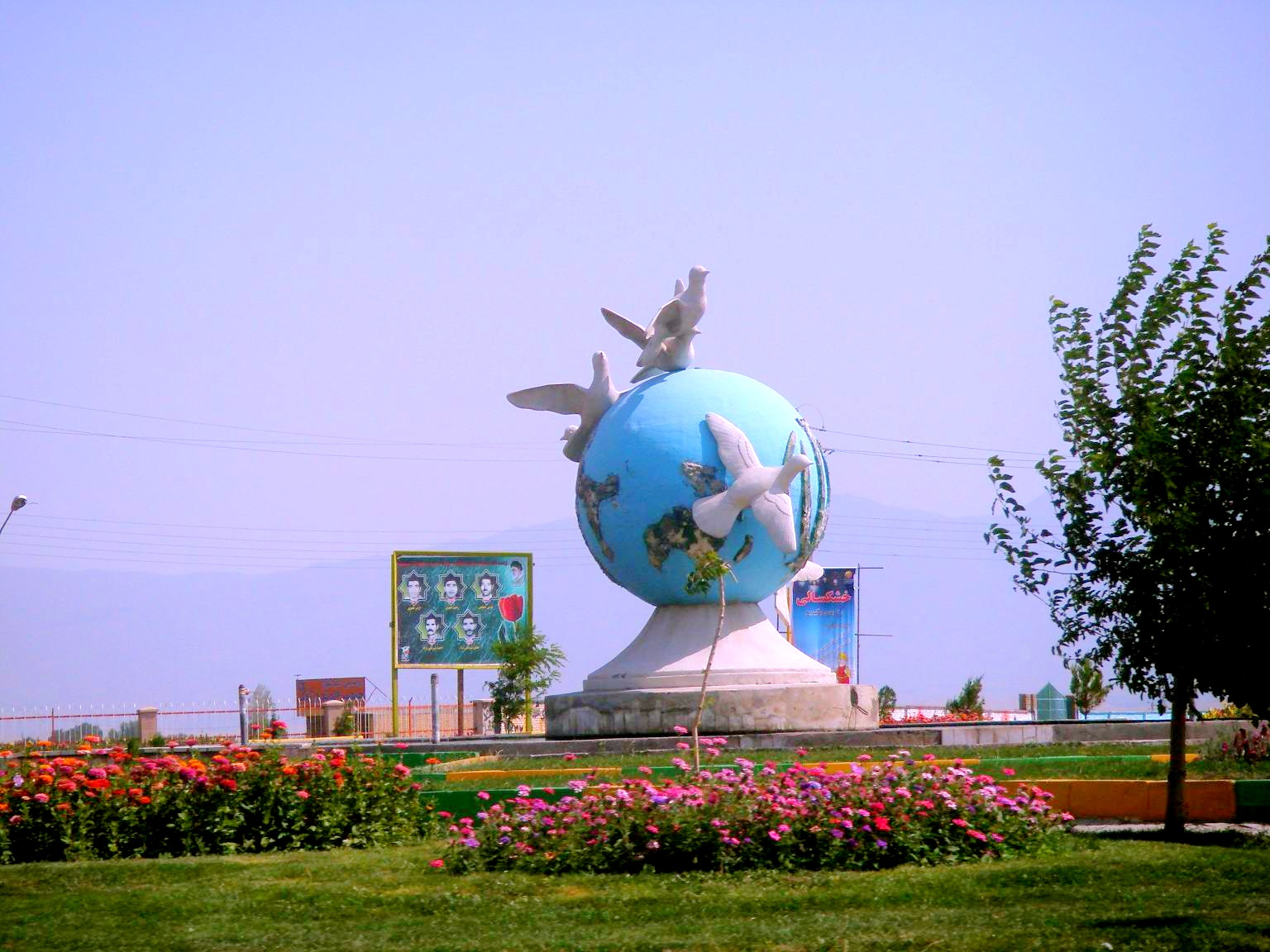
- Sarab

- Location within Iran
- Coordinates: 37°56′32″N 47°32′10″E
- Country: Iran
- Province: East Azerbaijan
- County: Sarab
- District: Central
- Elevation: 1,650 m (5,410 ft)

Population (2016)
  - Total: 45,031
- Time zone: UTC+3:30 (IRST)
- Area code: 41

Sarab (Persian: سراب) (Note: Azeri: ساراب) is a city in the Central District of Sarab County, East Azerbaijan province, Iran, serving as capital of both the county and the district. Sarab is famous for its rugs.

== Demographics ==
=== Language and ethnicity ===
Sarabi people are Azerbaijanis speaking the Azeri Turkic language, but with a special accent, where the pronunciation of words is more like the Ardabil dialect while verb conjugation is more similar to the Tabriz dialect.

=== Religion ===
Shi'ite Muslims predominate among the Azeri speaking Turks of Iran, particularly in East Azerbaijan province where Sarab is located.

=== Population ===
The people of Sarab consist of 37% citizens, 16% nomadic people, mainly from Moghan and rest of the people live in Sarab's villages.

At the time of the 2006 National Census, the city's population was 42,057 in 11,045 households. The following census in 2011 counted 44,846 people in 13,353 households. The 2016 census measured the population of the city as 45,031 people in 13,953 households.

== Geography ==
=== Location ===
East of Sarab leads to Ardabil province. North lies Savalan Mountain. Westward from Sarab leads to the city of Bostanabad, and to the south are the Bozghush mountains.

=== Environs ===
Sarab is the only city in Sarab County, with almost half of the total population of the Central District, and more than a third of the population of the entire county. The city of Sarab is surrounded by rural villages. Some of the larger villages are: Razliq, Asbforushan, Qaleh Juq, and Andarab. There are 161 others, as well as thirteen abandoned villages around it.

=== Climate ===
Sarab has a cold semi-arid climate (Köppen BSk). Winters are cold and snowy, while summers are warm to hot with little precipitation. Most of the annual precipitation falls between the months of November and May.

Climate data for Sarab (1991-2020)
Month	Jan	Feb	Mar	Apr	May	Jun	Jul	Aug	Sep	Oct	Nov	Dec	Year
Record high °C (°F)	15.2 (59.4)	16.6 (61.9)	23.6 (74.5)	28.0 (82.4)	30.6 (87.1)	35.6 (96.1)	37.4 (99.3)	37.4 (99.3)	37.0 (98.6)	30.2 (86.4)	22.8 (73.0)	19.8 (67.6)	37.4 (99.3)
Mean daily maximum °C (°F)	1.6 (34.9)	4.0 (39.2)	9.8 (49.6)	15.6 (60.1)	20.8 (69.4)	26.2 (79.2)	29.0 (84.2)	29.6 (85.3)	25.8 (78.4)	19.0 (66.2)	10.2 (50.4)	4.0 (39.2)	16.3 (61.3)
Daily mean °C (°F)	−4.6 (23.7)	−2.0 (28.4)	3.3 (37.9)	8.7 (47.7)	13.3 (55.9)	17.8 (64.0)	20.4 (68.7)	20.4 (68.7)	16.3 (61.3)	10.4 (50.7)	3.1 (37.6)	−2.2 (28.0)	8.7 (47.7)
Mean daily minimum °C (°F)	−10.1 (13.8)	−7.5 (18.5)	−2.8 (27.0)	1.8 (35.2)	5.7 (42.3)	8.8 (47.8)	12.0 (53.6)	11.5 (52.7)	7.2 (45.0)	2.6 (36.7)	−2.5 (27.5)	−7.4 (18.7)	1.6 (34.9)
Record low °C (°F)	−29.6 (−21.3)	−30.0 (−22.0)	−20.4 (−4.7)	−11.4 (11.5)	−10.4 (13.3)	−1.4 (29.5)	1.6 (34.9)	3.0 (37.4)	−1.8 (28.8)	−6.4 (20.5)	−24.4 (−11.9)	−29.6 (−21.3)	−30.0 (−22.0)
Average precipitation mm (inches)	15.6 (0.61)	15.7 (0.62)	23.5 (0.93)	47.1 (1.85)	40.9 (1.61)	15.1 (0.59)	12.3 (0.48)	7.4 (0.29)	8.2 (0.32)	21.0 (0.83)	23.1 (0.91)	13.6 (0.54)	243.5 (9.59)
Average precipitation days (≥ 1.0 mm)	3.9	4.1	5.5	7.8	7.8	3.8	2.1	1.4	1.5	3.9	4.7	3.5	50.0
Average relative humidity (%)	75	71	62	59	58	52	52	50	52	58	69	74	61
Average dew point °C (°F)	−8.7 (16.3)	−7.0 (19.4)	−4.4 (24.1)	−0.2 (31.6)	3.8 (38.8)	6.3 (43.3)	8.6 (47.5)	7.6 (45.7)	4.5 (40.1)	1.0 (33.8)	−2.7 (27.1)	−6.7 (19.9)	0.2 (32.3)
Mean monthly sunshine hours	145	162	193	210	276	340	358	347	303	244	174	138	2,890
Source 1: NOAA NCEI
Source 2: http://eamo.ir (records)

Climate data for Sarab
Month	Jan	Feb	Mar	Apr	May	Jun	Jul	Aug	Sep	Oct	Nov	Dec	Year
Record high °C (°F)	15.2 (59.4)	16.4 (61.5)	23.6 (74.5)	25.8 (78.4)	28.0 (82.4)	34.0 (93.2)	37.4 (99.3)	37.4 (99.3)	37.0 (98.6)	30.2 (86.4)	22.8 (73.0)	19.8 (67.6)	37.4 (99.3)
Mean daily maximum °C (°F)	1.8 (35.2)	2.0 (35.6)	7.0 (44.6)	13.5 (56.3)	18.8 (65.8)	24.7 (76.5)	27.9 (82.2)	29.5 (85.1)	26.9 (80.4)	21.1 (70.0)	12.8 (55.0)	5.8 (42.4)	16.0 (60.8)
Daily mean °C (°F)	−4.5 (23.9)	−3.8 (25.2)	1.1 (34.0)	6.8 (44.2)	11.8 (53.2)	16.8 (62.2)	19.7 (67.5)	20.8 (69.4)	17.8 (64.0)	12.3 (54.1)	5.8 (42.4)	−0.5 (31.1)	8.7 (47.6)
Mean daily minimum °C (°F)	−9.7 (14.5)	−9.1 (15.6)	−4.3 (24.3)	0.1 (32.2)	4.4 (39.9)	7.6 (45.7)	10.9 (51.6)	11.9 (53.4)	8.3 (46.9)	3.6 (38.5)	−0.5 (31.1)	−5.7 (21.7)	1.5 (34.6)
Record low °C (°F)	−29.6 (−21.3)	−30.0 (−22.0)	−20.4 (−4.7)	−11.4 (11.5)	−10.4 (13.3)	−1.4 (29.5)	1.6 (34.9)	3.0 (37.4)	−0.6 (30.9)	−6.4 (20.5)	−24.4 (−11.9)	−23.6 (−10.5)	−30.0 (−22.0)
Average precipitation mm (inches)	14.5 (0.57)	13.6 (0.54)	20.4 (0.80)	37.6 (1.48)	51.3 (2.02)	19.7 (0.78)	13.0 (0.51)	9.6 (0.38)	7.6 (0.30)	15.1 (0.59)	28.0 (1.10)	13.5 (0.53)	243.9 (9.6)
Average rainy days	7	9	9	10	13	7	4	3	2	4	8	7	83
Average relative humidity (%)	75	73	65	57	58	53	53	50	51	53	65	71	60
Mean monthly sunshine hours	129.9	149.8	161.9	204.3	250.6	321.7	351.8	331.4	316.4	251.4	180.8	139.8	2,789.8
Source: http://eamo.ir

== Rugs ==
The rugs of Sarab, which are also classified among those known as Heriz (Herez), have light, rather bright colour schemes. The usual adjective for "of Sarab" would be "Sarab-i", this changed to "Serapi". In 1876, about the time that Sarabi rugs were coming on the market in England, the Prince of Wales made a trip to India on H.M.S. Serapis. The similarity of the names led to the form "Serapi" for the rugs. They are not to be confused with the rugs of eastern Turkestan which are generally known as "Samarkands", but occasionally "Serapi".

== Higher education ==
- Islamic Azad University, Sarab Branch
- Sama Technical College of Sarab
- Payame noor University of Sarab
- Allameh Amini Technical College of Sarab

== See also ==
- Sarab Khanate

Media related to Sarab at Wikimedia Commons
