= Mir Kuh =

Mir Kuh or Mirkuh (Persian: ميركوه) may refer to:

- Mir Kuh-e Olya
- Mir Kuh-e Sofla
- Mir Kuh-e Vosta
