= Abarghan =

Abarghan or Aberghan or Abraghan (Persian: ابرغان) may refer to:

- Abarghan, Marand, East Azerbaijan Province
- Abarghan, Sarab, East Azerbaijan Province
- Abarghan, Razavi Khorasan
- Abarghan Rural District, in East Azerbaijan Province
