= Kalantar (disambiguation) =

Kalantar is an Indian newspaper.

Kalantar may also refer to:

- Kalantar (title), was a title which referred to the mayor in charge of a town in Iran
- Kalantar, Ardabil, Iran
- Kalantar, East Azerbaijan, Iran
- Kalantar-e Olya, East Azerbaijan Province, Iran
- Kalantar-e Sofla, East Azerbaijan Province, Iran
- Kalantar, Kermanshah, Iran
- Kalantar, North Khorasan, Iran
- Kalantar (Russian: Калантарь) - a name of a kind of mail and plate armour
- Kamyar Kalantar-Zadeh, American physician scientist in nephrology, nutrition, and epidemiology, Los Angeles, USA

== See also ==
- Kalantari, an Iranian surname
- Vijay Kalantri (born 1949), an Indian industrialist
- Vikas Kalantri, an Indian actor in Hindi cinema
