= Shir Mardan =

Shir Mardan شيرمردان
- Village
- Location within Iran
- Coordinates: 38°05′56″N 47°28′48″E
- Country: Iran
- Province: East Azerbaijan
- County: Sarab
- Bakhsh: Central
- Rural District: Razliq

Population (2006)
  - Total: 48
- Time zone: UTC+3:30 (IRST)
  - Summer (DST): UTC+4:30 (IRDT)

Shir Mardan (Persian: شيرمردان, also Romanized as Shīr Mardān) is a village in Razliq Rural District, in the Central District of Sarab County, East Azerbaijan Province, Iran. At the 2006 census, its population was 48, in 13 families.
