= Asbgaran =

Asbgaran اسبگران
- Village
- Location within Iran
- Coordinates: 37°54′15″N 47°37′24″E
- Country: Iran
- Province: East Azerbaijan
- County: Sarab
- Bakhsh: Central
- Rural District: Aghmiyun

Population (2006)
  - Total: 339
- Time zone: UTC+3:30 (IRST)
  - Summer (DST): UTC+4:30 (IRDT)

Asbgaran (Persian: اسبگران, also Romanized as Asbgarān and Asb Gerān) is a village in Aghmiyun Rural District, in the Central District of Sarab County, East Azerbaijan Province, Iran. At the 2006 census, its population was 339, in 77 families.
