= Sowmeeh-ye Haq =

Sowmeeh-ye Haq صومعه حق
- Village
- Location within Iran
- Coordinates: 37°47′05″N 47°31′32″E
- Country: Iran
- Province: East Azerbaijan
- County: Sarab
- Bakhsh: Central
- Rural District: Howmeh

Population (2006)
  - Total: 110
- Time zone: UTC+3:30 (IRST)
  - Summer (DST): UTC+4:30 (IRDT)

Sowmeeh-ye Haq (Persian: صومعه حق, also Romanized as Şowme‘eh-ye Ḩaq; also known as Şowma‘eh-ye Malekshāh) is a village in Howmeh Rural District, in the Central District of Sarab County, East Azerbaijan Province, Iran. At the 2006 census, its population was 110, in 27 families.
