= Allah Haqq =

Allah Haqq اله حق
- Village
- Location within Iran
- Coordinates: 37°47′24″N 47°29′20″E
- Country: Iran
- Province: East Azerbaijan
- County: Sarab
- Bakhsh: Central
- Rural District: Howmeh

Population (2006)
  - Total: 218
- Time zone: UTC+3:30 (IRST)
  - Summer (DST): UTC+4:30 (IRDT)

Allah Haqq (Persian: اله حق, also Romanized as Allāh Ḩaqq and Allāh Ḩaq) is a small village in Howmeh Rural District, in the Central District of Sarab County, East Azerbaijan Province, Iran. At the 2006 census, its population was 218, in 45 families.
