= Mardabad, East Azerbaijan =

Mardabad مرداباد
- Village
- Location within Iran
- Coordinates: 37°49′00″N 47°17′00″E
- Country: Iran
- Province: East Azerbaijan
- County: Sarab
- Bakhsh: Central
- Rural District: Abarghan

Population (2006)
  - Total: 57
- Time zone: UTC+3:30 (IRST)
  - Summer (DST): UTC+4:30 (IRDT)

Mardabad (Persian: مرداباد, also Romanized as Mardābād; also known as Qarīq) is a village in Abarghan Rural District, in the Central District of Sarab County, East Azerbaijan Province, Iran. At the 2006 census, its population was 57, in 13 families.
