= Manqutay =

Manqutay منقوطای
- Village
- Location within Iran
- Coordinates: 37°56′32″N 47°46′07″E
- Country: Iran
- Province: East Azerbaijan
- County: Sarab
- Bakhsh: Central
- Rural District: Sain

Population (2006)
  - Total: 171
- Time zone: UTC+3:30 (IRST)
  - Summer (DST): UTC+4:30 (IRDT)

Manqutay (Persian: منقوطای, also Romanized as Manqūţāy and Manqūtāy) is a village in Sain Rural District, in the Central District of Sarab County, East Azerbaijan Province, Iran. At the 2006 census, its population was 171, in 37 families.

== Name ==
According to Vladimir Minorsky, the name "Manqutay" is derived from a Mongolian personal name, Manqutay, with one example being the father of the Ilkhanid general Qutlugh-Shah.
