= Tokaldan =

Tokaldan تكلدان
- Village
- Location within Iran
- Coordinates: 37°54′20″N 47°36′12″E
- Country: Iran
- Province: East Azerbaijan
- County: Sarab
- Bakhsh: Central
- Rural District: Aghmiyun

Population (2006)
  - Total: 577
- Time zone: UTC+3:30 (IRST)
  - Summer (DST): UTC+4:30 (IRDT)

Tokaldan (Persian: تكلدان, also Romanized as Tokaldān) is a village in Aghmiyun Rural District, in the Central District of Sarab County, East Azerbaijan Province, Iran. At the 2006 census, its population was 577, in 135 families.
