= Estelu =

Estelu اسطلو
- Village
- Location within Iran
- Coordinates: 38°04′08″N 47°33′47″E
- Country: Iran
- Province: East Azerbaijan
- County: Sarab
- Bakhsh: Central
- Rural District: Razliq

Population (2006)
  - Total: 304
- Time zone: UTC+3:30 (IRST)
  - Summer (DST): UTC+4:30 (IRDT)

Estelu (Persian: اسطلو, also Romanized as Esţelū; also known as Esţelūlajbīn) is a village in Razliq Rural District, in the Central District of Sarab County, East Azerbaijan Province, Iran. At the 2006 census, its population was 304, in 62 families.
