= Asfastan =

Asfastan or Asfestan (Persian: اسفستان) may refer to:

- Asfestan, East Azerbaijan
- Asfastan, Qazvin
