= Shureh Del =

Shureh Del شوره دل
- Village
- Location within Iran
- Coordinates: 37°55′00″N 47°40′32″E
- Country: Iran
- Province: East Azerbaijan
- County: Sarab
- Bakhsh: Central
- Rural District: Aghmiyun

Population (2006)
  - Total: 338
- Time zone: UTC+3:30 (IRST)
  - Summer (DST): UTC+4:30 (IRDT)

Shureh Del (Persian: شوره دل, also Romanized as Shūreh Del; also known as Shūr Del) is a village in Aghmiyun Rural District, in the Central District of Sarab County, East Azerbaijan Province, Iran. At the 2006 census, its population was 338, in 88 families.
