= Qarah Masjed =

Qarah Masjed قره مسجد
- Village
- Location within Iran
- Coordinates: 38°02′57″N 47°44′50″E
- Country: Iran
- Province: East Azerbaijan
- County: Sarab
- Bakhsh: Central
- Rural District: Sain

Population (2006)
  - Total: 111
- Time zone: UTC+3:30 (IRST)
  - Summer (DST): UTC+4:30 (IRDT)

Qarah Masjed (Persian: قره مسجد, also Romanized as Qareh Masjed) is a village in Sain Rural District, in the Central District of Sarab County, East Azerbaijan Province, Iran. At the 2006 census, its population was 111, in 19 families.
