= Sanduqlu =

Sanduqlu صندوقلو
- Village
- Location within Iran
- Coordinates: 38°07′04″N 47°49′59″E
- Country: Iran
- Province: East Azerbaijan
- County: Sarab
- Bakhsh: Central
- Rural District: Sain

Population (2006)
  - Total: 80
- Time zone: UTC+3:30 (IRST)
  - Summer (DST): UTC+4:30 (IRDT)

Sanduqlu (Persian: صندوقلو, also Romanized as Şandūqlū) is a village in Sain Rural District, in the Central District of Sarab County, East Azerbaijan Province, Iran. At the 2006 census, its population was 80, in 19 families.
