= Tirshab =

Tirshab تيرشاب
- Village
- Location within Iran
- Coordinates: 37°51′15″N 47°34′34″E
- Country: Iran
- Province: East Azerbaijan
- County: Sarab
- Bakhsh: Central
- Rural District: Howmeh

Population (2006)
  - Total: 99
- Time zone: UTC+3:30 (IRST)
  - Summer (DST): UTC+4:30 (IRDT)

Tirshab (Persian: تيرشاب, also Romanized as Tīrshāb; also known as Tīr Shahāb) is a village in Howmeh Rural District, in the Central District of Sarab County, East Azerbaijan Province, Iran. At the 2006 census, its population was 99, in 20 families.
