= Kalian, Sarab =

Village in East Azerbaijan province, Iran

Kalian Persian: كليان
- Village
- Location within Iran
- Coordinates: 37°58′14″N 47°45′33″E
- Country: Iran
- Province: East Azerbaijan
- County: Sarab
- District: Central
- Rural District: Sain

Population (2016)
  - Total: 423
- Time zone: UTC+3:30 (IRST)

Kalian (Persian: كليان) (Note: Also romanized as Kalīān) is a village in, and the capital of, Sain Rural District in the Central District of Sarab County, East Azerbaijan province, Iran.

== Demographics ==
=== Population ===
At the time of the 2006 National Census, the village's population was 401 in 79 households. The following census in 2011 counted 454 people in 108 households. The 2016 census measured the population of the village as 423 people in 106 households. It was the most populous village in its rural district.
