= Chehgush =

Village in East Azerbaijan province, Iran

Chehgush Persian: چه گوش
- Village
- Location within Iran
- Coordinates: 37°57′53″N 47°34′10″E
- Country: Iran
- Province: East Azerbaijan
- County: Sarab
- District: Central
- Rural District: Razliq

Population (2016)
  - Total: 1,364
- Time zone: UTC+3:30 (IRST)

Chehgush (Persian: چه گوش) (Note: Also romanized as Chehgūsh; also known as Cheqūsh) is a village in Razliq Rural District of the Central District in Sarab County, East Azerbaijan province, Iran.

== Demographics ==
=== Population ===
At the time of the 2006 National Census, the village's population was 1,543 in 366 households. The following census in 2011 counted 1,442 people in 411 households. The 2016 census measured the population of the village as 1,364 people in 398 households.
