= Qezel Gechi =

Village in East Azerbaijan province, Iran

Qezel Gechi Persian: قزل گچي
- Village
- Location within Iran
- Coordinates: 37°58′05″N 47°20′18″E
- Country: Iran
- Province: East Azerbaijan
- County: Sarab
- District: Central
- Rural District: Abarghan

Population (2016)
  - Total: 691
- Time zone: UTC+3:30 (IRST)

Qezel Gechi (Persian: قزل گچي) (Note: Also romanized as Qezel Gechī; also known as Qezelkechī) is a village in Abarghan Rural District of the Central District in Sarab County, East Azerbaijan province, Iran.

== Demographics ==
=== Population ===
At the time of the 2006 National Census, the village's population was 802 in 169 households. The following census in 2011 counted 770 people in 222 households. The 2016 census measured the population of the village as 691 people in 205 households.
