= Tazeh Kand, Howmeh =

Village in East Azerbaijan province, Iran

Tazeh Kand Persian: تازه كند
- Village
- Location within Iran
- Coordinates: 37°49′10″N 47°34′17″E
- Country: Iran
- Province: East Azerbaijan
- County: Sarab
- District: Central
- Rural District: Howmeh

Population (2016)
  - Total: 544
- Time zone: UTC+3:30 (IRST)

Tazeh Kand (Persian: تازه كند) (Note: Also romanized as Tāzeh Kand) is a village in Howmeh Rural District of the Central District in Sarab County, East Azerbaijan province, Iran.

== Demographics ==
=== Population ===
At the time of the 2006 National Census, the village's population was 586 in 149 households. The following census in 2011 counted 588 people in 174 households. The 2016 census measured the population of the village as 544 people in 173 households.
