= Qareh Kanlu =

Qareh Kanlu (Persian: قره كانلو) may refer to:

- Qareh Kanlu, East Azerbaijan
- Qareh Kanlu, North Khorasan
