= Heris, Sarab =

Village in East Azerbaijan province, Iran

Heris Persian: هريس
- Village
- Location within Iran
- Coordinates: 37°49′34″N 47°30′58″E
- Country: Iran
- Province: East Azerbaijan
- County: Sarab
- District: Central
- Rural District: Howmeh

Population (2016)
  - Total: 1,381
- Time zone: UTC+3:30 (IRST)

Heris (Persian: هريس) (Note: Also romanized as Herīs) is a village in Howmeh Rural District of the Central District in Sarab County, East Azerbaijan province, Iran.

== Demographics ==
=== Population ===
At the time of the 2006 National Census, the village's population was 1,483 in 354 households. The following census in 2011 counted 1,303 people in 342 households. The 2016 census measured the population of the village as 1,381 people in 400 households.
