= Kalantar-e Olya =

Kalantar-e Olya كلانترعليا
- Village
- Location within Iran
- Coordinates: 38°04′00″N 47°49′00″E
- Country: Iran
- Province: East Azerbaijan
- County: Sarab
- Bakhsh: Central
- Rural District: Sain

Population (2006)
  - Total: 123
- Time zone: UTC+3:30 (IRST)
  - Summer (DST): UTC+4:30 (IRDT)

Kalantar-e Olya (Persian: كلانترعليا, also Romanized as Kalāntar-e ‘Olyā; also known as Kalāntar-e Gholām) is a village in Sain Rural District, in the Central District of Sarab County, East Azerbaijan Province, Iran. At the 2006 census, its population was 123, in 23 families.
