= Qushchi, Sarab =

Village in East Azerbaijan province, Iran

Qushchi Persian: قوشچي
- Village
- Location within Iran
- Coordinates: 37°47′03″N 47°15′30″E
- Country: Iran
- Province: East Azerbaijan
- County: Sarab
- District: Central
- Rural District: Abarghan

Population (2016)
  - Total: 661
- Time zone: UTC+3:30 (IRST)

Qushchi (Persian: قوشچي) (Note: Also romanized as Qūshchī; also known as Qūshehī) is a village in Abarghan Rural District of the Central District in Sarab County, East Azerbaijan province, Iran.

== Demographics ==
=== Population ===
At the time of the 2006 National Census, the village's population was 923 in 191 households. The following census in 2011 counted 851 people in 217 households. The 2016 census measured the population of the village as 661 people in 209 households.
