= Bijand =

Village in East Azerbaijan province, Iran

Bijand Persian: بيجند
- Village
- Location within Iran
- Coordinates: 37°49′16″N 47°33′31″E
- Country: Iran
- Province: East Azerbaijan
- County: Sarab
- District: Central
- Rural District: Howmeh

Population (2016)
  - Total: 1,684
- Time zone: UTC+3:30 (IRST)

Bijand (Persian: بيجند) (Note: Also romanized as Bījand; also known as Bejand) is a village in Howmeh Rural District of the Central District in Sarab County, East Azerbaijan province, Iran.

== Demographics ==
=== Population ===
At the time of the 2006 National Census, the village's population was 1,674 in 438 households. The following census in 2011 counted 1,891 people in 557 households. The 2016 census measured the population of the village as 1,684 people in 543 households.
