= Owghan, East Azerbaijan =

Village in East Azerbaijan province, Iran

Owghan Persian: اوغان
- Village
- Location within Iran
- Coordinates: 37°54′18″N 47°29′43″E
- Country: Iran
- Province: East Azerbaijan
- County: Sarab
- District: Central
- Rural District: Howmeh

Population (2016)
  - Total: 1,554
- Time zone: UTC+3:30 (IRST)

Owghan (Persian: اوغان) (Note: Also romanized as Owghān; also known as Owqān) is a village in Howmeh Rural District of the Central District in Sarab County, East Azerbaijan province, Iran.

== Demographics ==
=== Population ===
At the time of the 2006 National Census, the village's population was 1,600 in 360 households. The following census in 2011 counted 1,552 people in 444 households. The 2016 census measured the population of the village as 1,554 people in 450 households.
