= Sahzab =

Village in East Azerbaijan province, Iran

Sahzab Persian: سهزاب
- Village
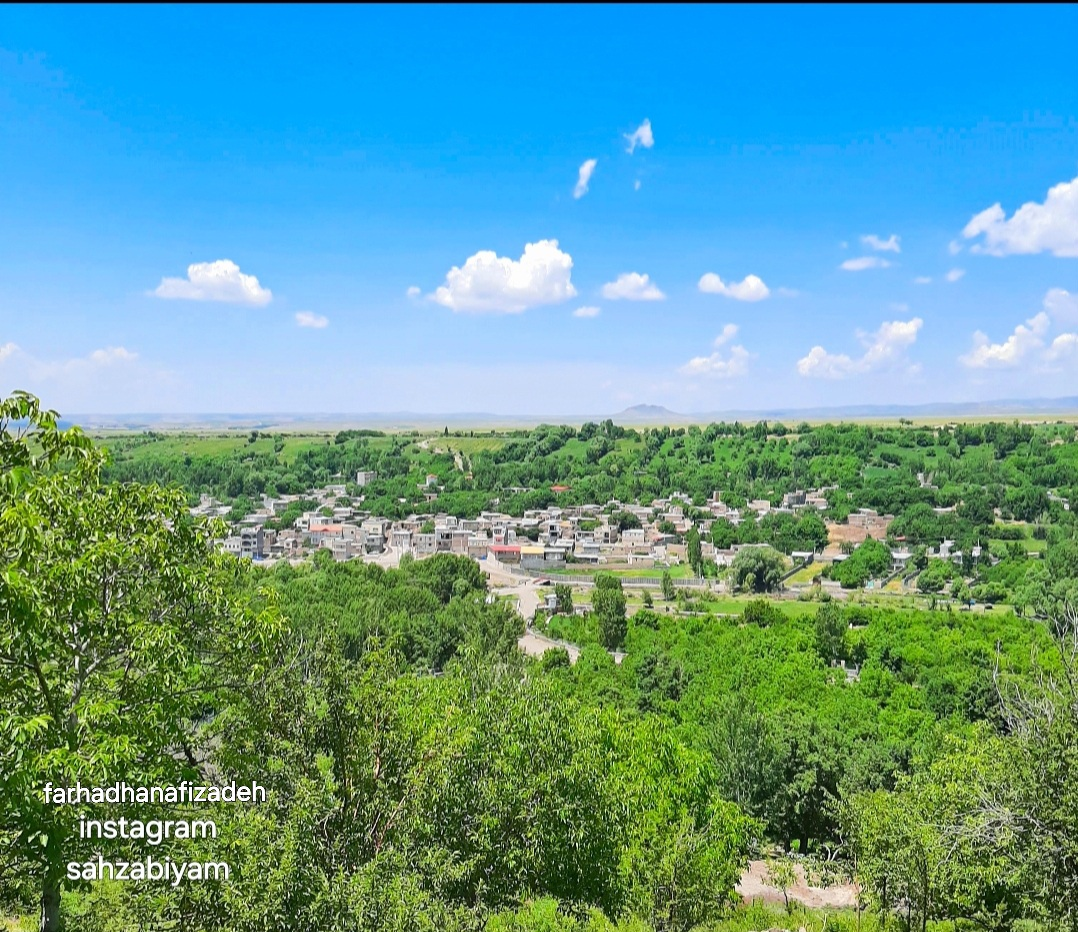
- The village of Sahzab

- Location within Iran
- Coordinates: 37°59′30″N 47°39′27″E
- Country: Iran
- Province: East Azerbaijan
- County: Sarab
- District: Central
- Rural District: Aghmiyun

Population (2016)
  - Total: 748
- Time zone: UTC+3:30 (IRST)

Sahzab (Persian: سهزاب) (Note: Also romanized as Sahzāb) is a village in Aghmiyun Rural District of the Central District in Sarab County, East Azerbaijan province, Iran.

== Demographics ==
=== Population ===
At the time of the 2006 National Census, the village's population was 683 in 201 households. The following census in 2011 counted 605 people in 194 households. The 2016 census measured the population of the village as 748 people in 268 households.

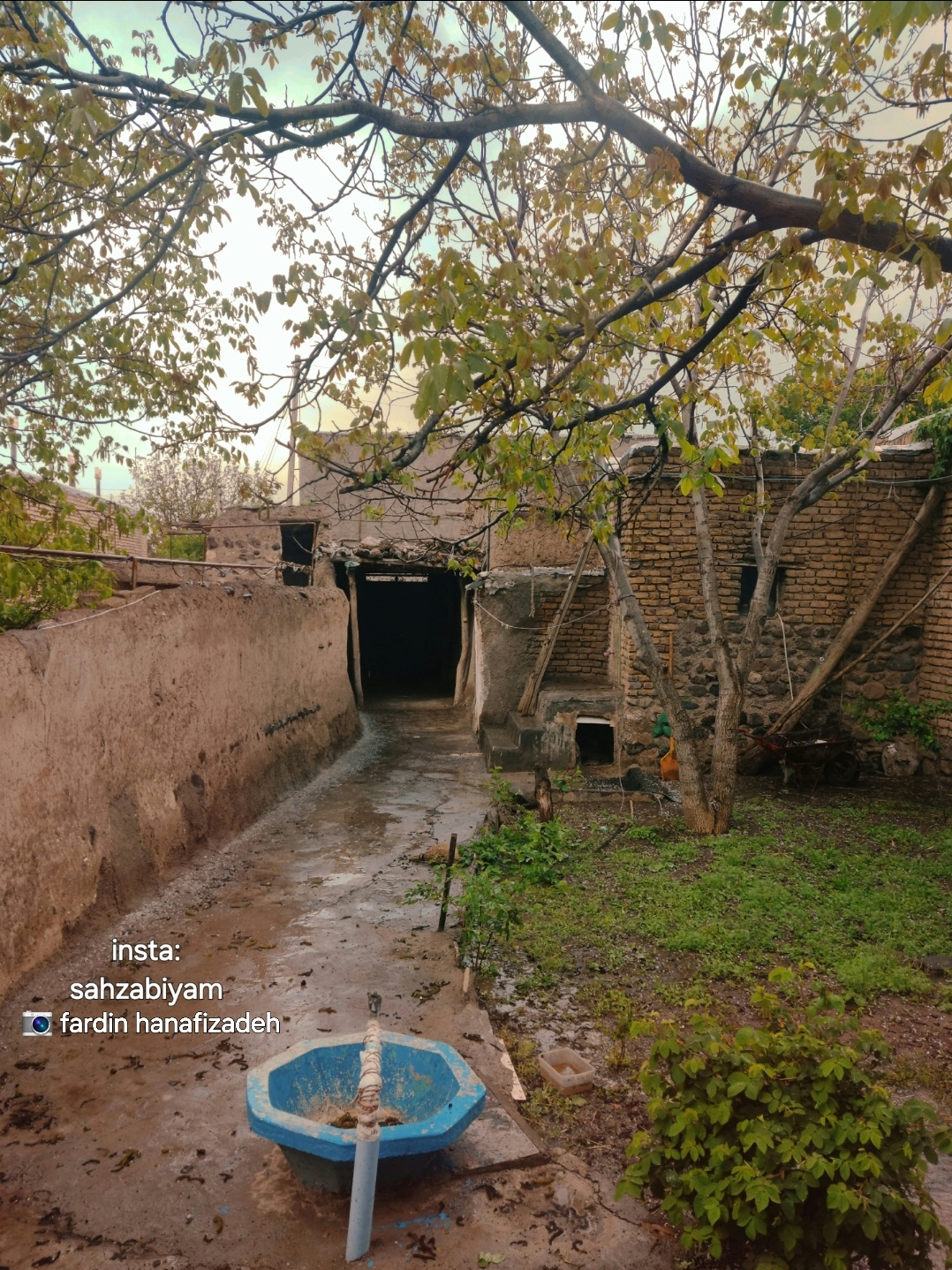
Sahzab

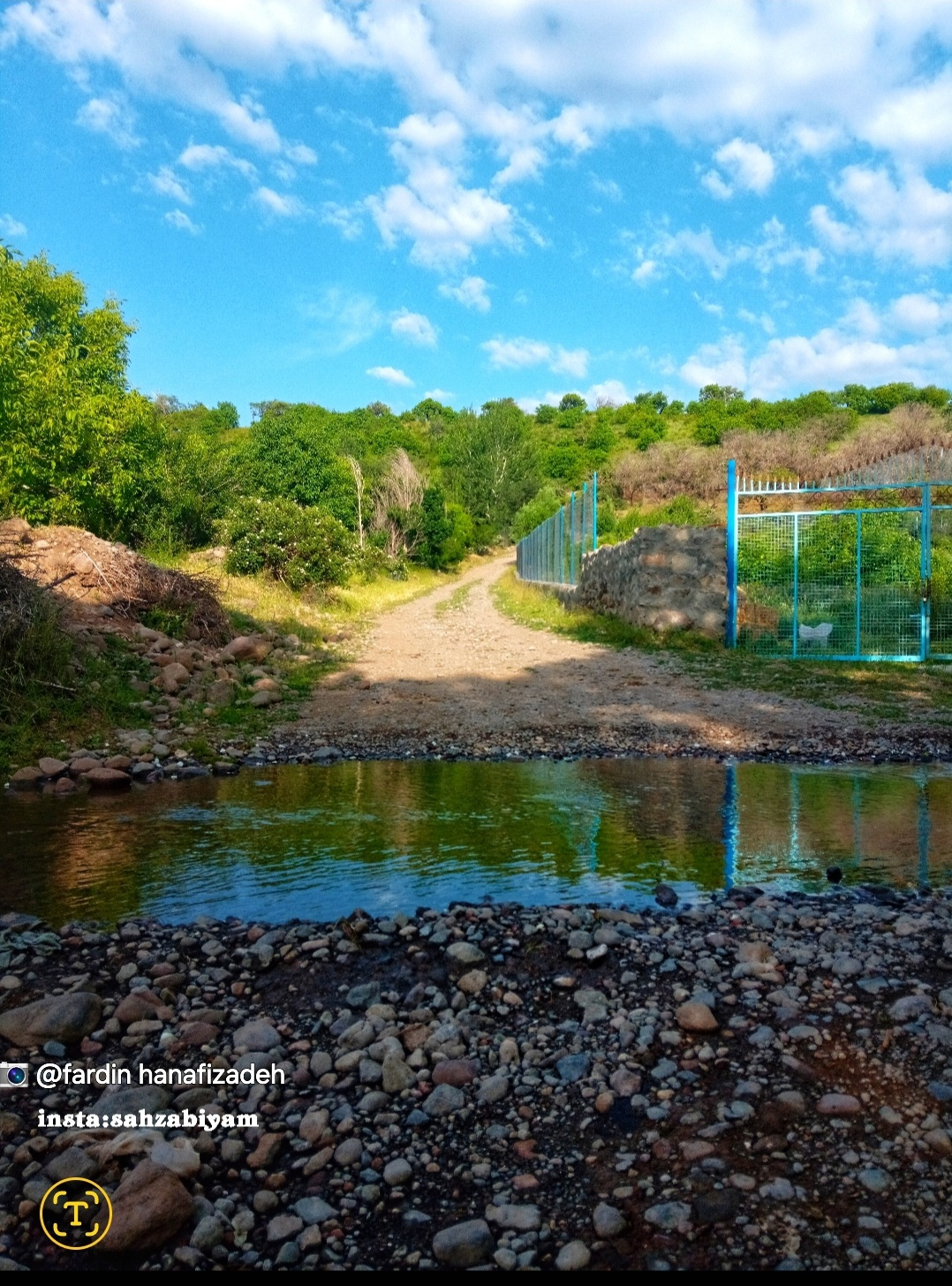
Sahzab
