= Darab, East Azerbaijan =

Village in East Azerbaijan province, Iran

Darab Persian: داراب
- Village
- Location within Iran
- Coordinates: 37°52′09″N 47°15′19″E
- Country: Iran
- Province: East Azerbaijan
- County: Sarab
- District: Central
- Rural District: Abarghan

Population (2016)
  - Total: 825
- Time zone: UTC+3:30 (IRST)

Darab (Persian: داراب) (Note: Also romanized as Dārāb) is a village in Abarghan Rural District of the Central District in Sarab County, East Azerbaijan province, Iran.

== Demographics ==
=== Population ===
At the time of the 2006 National Census, the village's population was 1,211 in 309 households. The following census in 2011 counted 1,069 people in 317 households. The 2016 census measured the population of the village as 825 people in 272 households.
