= Kalantar-e Sofla =

Kalantar-e Sofla كلانترسفلي
- Village
- Location within Iran
- Coordinates: 38°04′11″N 47°49′26″E
- Country: Iran
- Province: East Azerbaijan
- County: Sarab
- Bakhsh: Central
- Rural District: Sain

Population (2006)
  - Total: 104
- Time zone: UTC+3:30 (IRST)
  - Summer (DST): UTC+4:30 (IRDT)

Kalantar-e Sofla (Persian: كلانترسفلي, also Romanized as Kalāntar-e Soflá; also known as Kalāntar-e Bābālū and Kalāntar) is a village in Sain Rural District, in the Central District of Sarab County, East Azerbaijan Province, Iran. At the 2006 census, its population was 104, in 19 families.
