= Aghmiyun =

Village in East Azerbaijan province, Iran

Aghmiyun Persian: اغميون
- Village
- Location within Iran
- Coordinates: 37°58′23″N 47°39′02″E
- Country: Iran
- Province: East Azerbaijan
- County: Sarab
- District: Central
- Rural District: Aghmiyun

Population (2016)
  - Total: 1,234
- Time zone: UTC+3:30 (IRST)

Aghmiyun (Persian: اغميون) (Note: Also romanized as Āgh Mīyūn, Aghmeyūn, Āghmeyūn, Āghmīūn, and Āghmīyūn) is a village in, and the capital of, Aghmiyun Rural District in the Central District of Sarab County, East Azerbaijan province, Iran.

== Demographics ==
=== Population ===
At the time of the 2006 National Census, the village's population was 1,493 in 395 households. The following census in 2011 counted 1,378 people in 404 households. The 2016 census measured the population of the village as 1,234 people in 402 households. It was the most populous village in its rural district.
