= Mir Kuh-e Vosta =

Mir Kuh-e Vosta ميركوه وسطي
- Village
- Location within Iran
- Coordinates: 38°03′40″N 47°32′39″E
- Country: Iran
- Province: East Azerbaijan
- County: Sarab
- Bakhsh: Central
- Rural District: Razliq

Population (2006)
  - Total: 122
- Time zone: UTC+3:30 (IRST)
  - Summer (DST): UTC+4:30 (IRDT)

Mir Kuh-e Vosta (Persian: ميركوه وسطي, also Romanized as Mīr Kūh-e Vosţá and Mīrkūh-e Vosţá; also known as Mīr Kūh and Mīr Kūh-e ‘Alīmīrzā) is a village in Razliq Rural District, in the Central District of Sarab County, East Azerbaijan Province, Iran. At the 2006 census, its population was 122, in 26 families.
