= Mir Kuh-e Olya =

Mir Kuh-e Olya ميركوه عليا
- Village
- Location within Iran
- Coordinates: 38°04′32″N 47°30′25″E
- Country: Iran
- Province: East Azerbaijan
- County: Sarab
- Bakhsh: Central
- Rural District: Razliq

Population (2006)
  - Total: 208
- Time zone: UTC+3:30 (IRST)
  - Summer (DST): UTC+4:30 (IRDT)

Mir Kuh-e Olya (Persian: ميركوه عليا, also Romanized as Mīrkūh-e ‘Olyá; also known as Mīr Kūh-e Solţān and Mīrkūh-e Solţāná) is a village in Razliq Rural District, in the Central District of Sarab County, East Azerbaijan Province, Iran. At the 2006 census, its population was 208, in 37 families.
