= Kadijan =

Village in East Azerbaijan province, Iran

Kadijan Persian: كاديجان
- Village
- Location within Iran
- Coordinates: 37°56′02″N 47°39′34″E
- Country: Iran
- Province: East Azerbaijan
- County: Sarab
- District: Central
- Rural District: Aghmiyun

Population (2016)
  - Total: 1,113
- Time zone: UTC+3:30 (IRST)

Kadijan (Persian: كاديجان) (Note: Also romanized as Kādījān) is a village in Aghmiyun Rural District of the Central District in Sarab County, East Azerbaijan province, Iran.

== Demographics ==
=== Population ===
At the time of the 2006 National Census, the village's population was 1,251 in 321 households. The following census in 2011 counted 1,722 people in 365 households. The 2016 census measured the population of the village as 1,113 people in 353 households.
