= Senziq =

Village in East Azerbaijan province, Iran

Senziq Persian: سنزیق
- Village
- Location within Iran
- Coordinates: 37°54′55″N 47°38′59″E
- Country: Iran
- Province: East Azerbaijan
- County: Sarab
- District: Central
- Rural District: Aghmiyun

Population (2016)
  - Total: 569
- Time zone: UTC+3:30 (IRST)

Senziq (Persian: سنزيق) (Note: Also romanized as Sanazīq, Sanzīq, and Senzīq; also known as Sanzigh and Sinzik) is a village in Aghmiyun Rural District of the Central District in Sarab County, East Azerbaijan province, Iran.

== Demographics ==
=== Population ===
At the time of the 2006 National Census, the village's population was 719 in 163 households. The following census in 2011 counted 623 people in 157 households. The 2016 census measured the population of the village as 569 people in 184 households.
