= Mir Kuh-e Sofla =

Mir Kuh-e Sofla ميركوه سفلي
- Village
- Location within Iran
- Coordinates: 38°01′51″N 47°30′13″E
- Country: Iran
- Province: East Azerbaijan
- County: Sarab
- Bakhsh: Central
- Rural District: Razliq

Population (2006)
  - Total: 87
- Time zone: UTC+3:30 (IRST)
  - Summer (DST): UTC+4:30 (IRDT)

Mir Kuh-e Sofla (Persian: ميركوه سفلي, also Romanized as Mīr Kūh-e Soflá; also known as Mīr Kūh-e Ḩājjī) is a village in Razliq Rural District, in the Central District of Sarab County, East Azerbaijan Province, Iran. At the 2006 census, its population was 87, in 23 families.
