= Fargush =

Village in East Azerbaijan province, Iran

Fargush Persian: فرگوش
- Village
- Location within Iran
- Coordinates: 37°56′30″N 47°37′24″E
- Country: Iran
- Province: East Azerbaijan
- County: Sarab
- District: Central
- Rural District: Aghmiyun

Population (2016)
  - Total: 943
- Time zone: UTC+3:30 (IRST)

Fargush (Persian: فرگوش) (Note: Also romanized as Fargūsh; also known as Farkūsh) is a village in Aghmiyun Rural District of the Central District in Sarab County, East Azerbaijan province, Iran.

== Demographics ==
=== Population ===
At the time of the 2006 National Census, the village's population was 938 in 247 households. The following census in 2011 counted 960 people in 253 households. The 2016 census measured the population of the village as 943 people in 264 households.
