= Sardha =

Village in East Azerbaijan province, Iran

Sardha Persian: سردها
- Village
- Location within Iran
- Coordinates: 37°49′50″N 47°26′28″E
- Country: Iran
- Province: East Azerbaijan
- County: Sarab
- District: Central
- Rural District: Howmeh

Population (2016)
  - Total: 1,126
- Time zone: UTC+3:30 (IRST)

Sardha (Persian: سردها) (Note: Also romanized as Sardahā and Sardhā; also known as Sardara and Sardora) is a village in Howmeh Rural District of the Central District in Sarab County, East Azerbaijan province, Iran.

== Demographics ==
=== Population ===
At the time of the 2006 National Census, the village's population was 1,230 in 324 households. The following census in 2011 counted 1,224 people in 349 households. The 2016 census measured the population of the village as 1,126 people in 354 households.
