= Yengejah, Sarab =

Village in East Azerbaijan province, Iran

Yengejah Persian: ینگجه
- Village
- Location within Iran
- Coordinates: 37°59′10″N 47°27′41″E
- Country: Iran
- Province: East Azerbaijan
- County: Sarab
- District: Central
- Rural District: Razliq

Population (2016)
  - Total: 568
- Time zone: UTC+3:30 (IRST)

Yengejah (Persian: ینگجه) is a village in Razliq Rural District of the Central District in Sarab County, East Azerbaijan province, Iran.

== Demographics ==
=== Population ===
At the time of the 2006 National Census, the village's population was 585 in 129 households. The following census in 2011 counted 647 people in 154 households. The 2016 census measured the population of the village as 568 people in 161 households.
