= Daman Jan =

Village in East Azerbaijan province, Iran

Daman Jan Persian: دامنجان
- Village
- Location within Iran
- Coordinates: 37°48′32″N 47°23′08″E
- Country: Iran
- Province: East Azerbaijan
- County: Sarab
- District: Central
- Rural District: Abarghan

Population (2016)
  - Total: 1,847
- Time zone: UTC+3:30 (IRST)

Daman Jan (Persian: دامنجان) (Note: Also Romanized as Dāman Jān) is a village in Abarghan Rural District of the Central District in Sarab County, East Azerbaijan province, Iran.

== Demographics ==
=== Population ===
At the time of the 2006 National Census, the village's population was 1,732 in 328 households. The following census in 2011 counted 1,720 people in 421 households. The 2016 census measured the population of the village as 1,847 people in 486 households. It was the most populous village in its rural district.
