= Qerkh Bolagh, Sarab =

Village in East Azerbaijan province, Iran

Qerkh Bolagh Persian: قرخبلاغ
- Village
- Location within Iran
- Coordinates: 38°04′17″N 47°47′25″E
- Country: Iran
- Province: East Azerbaijan
- County: Sarab
- District: Central
- Rural District: Sain

Population (2016)
  - Total: 257
- Time zone: UTC+3:30 (IRST)

Qerkh Bolagh (Persian: قرخ بلاغ) (Note: Also romanized as Qerkh Bolāgh; also known as Farrokh Bolāgh) is a village in Sain Rural District of the Central District in Sarab County, East Azerbaijan province, Iran.

== Demographics ==
=== Population ===
At the time of the 2006 National Census, the village's population was 260 in 42 households. The following census in 2011 counted 262 people in 70 households. The 2016 census measured the population of the village as 257 people in 69 households.
