= Dambaran =

Village in East Azerbaijan province, Iran

Dambaran Persian: دامباران
- Village
- Location within Iran
- Coordinates: 37°50′24″N 47°13′39″E
- Country: Iran
- Province: East Azerbaijan
- County: Sarab
- District: Central
- Rural District: Abarghan

Population (2016)
  - Total: 845
- Time zone: UTC+3:30 (IRST)

Dambaran (Persian: دامباران) (Note: Also romanized as Dāmbārān; also known as Dānbārān (دانباران)) is a village in Abarghan Rural District of the Central District in Sarab County, East Azerbaijan province, Iran.

== Demographics ==
=== Population ===
At the time of the 2006 National Census, the village's population was 1,297 in 294 households. The following census in 2011 counted 985 people in 259 households. The 2016 census measured the population of the village as 845 people in 274 households.
