= Shireh Jin =

Village in East Azerbaijan province, Iran

Shireh Jin Persian: شيره جين
- Village
- Location within Iran
- Coordinates: 37°59′09″N 47°31′18″E
- Country: Iran
- Province: East Azerbaijan
- County: Sarab
- District: Central
- Rural District: Razliq

Population (2016)
  - Total: 1,135
- Time zone: UTC+3:30 (IRST)

Shireh Jin (Persian: شيره جين) (Note: Also romanized as Shīreh Jīn; also known as Shirvan Jikh, Shīrvānchīq, and Shirvanjik) is a village in Razliq Rural District of the Central District in Sarab County, East Azerbaijan province, Iran.

== Demographics ==
=== Population ===
At the time of the 2006 National Census, the village's population was 1,304 in 340 households. The following census in 2011 counted 1,282 people in 380 households. The 2016 census measured the population of the village as 1,135 people in 355 households.
