= Emam Chay =

Village in East Azerbaijan province, Iran

Emam Chay Persian: امام چاي
- Village
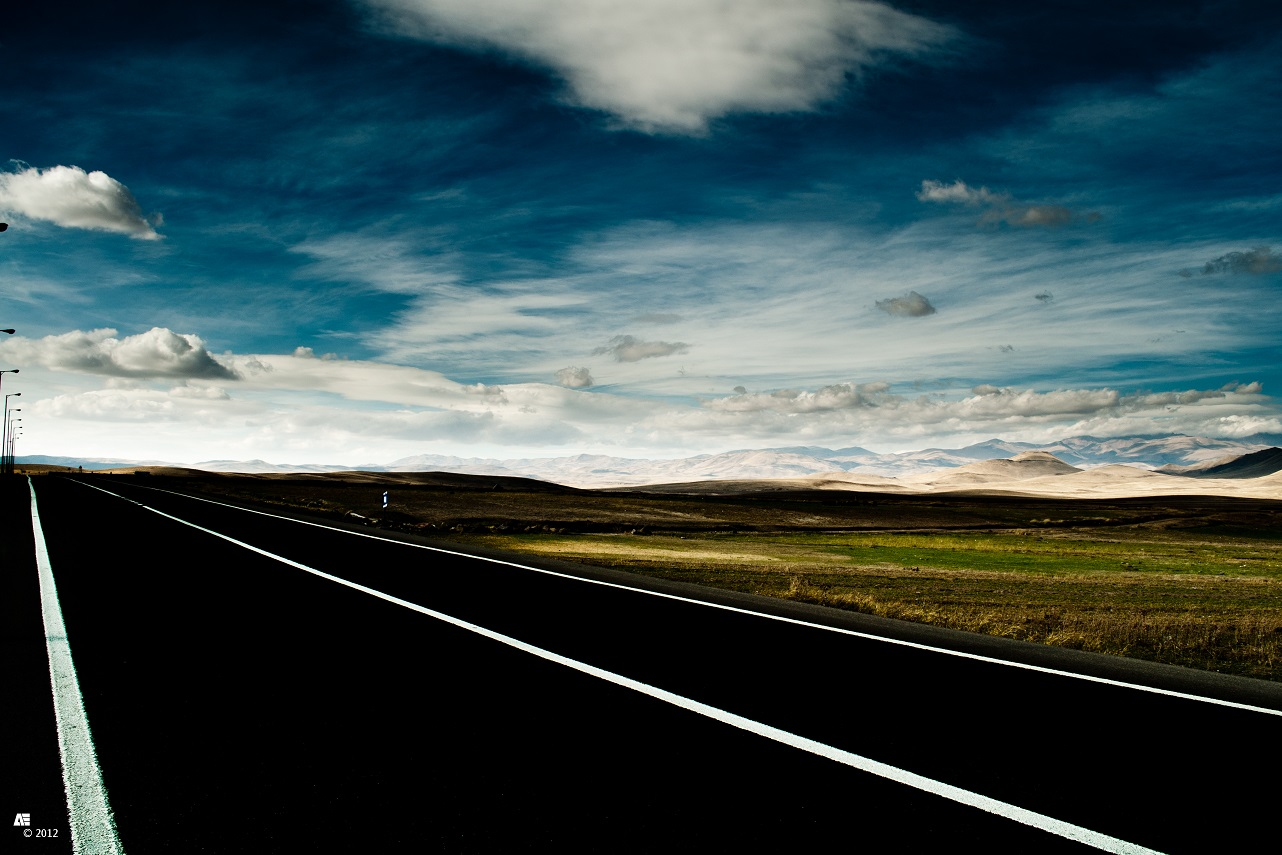
- Sabalan slope facing Imam Chai hill

- Location within Iran
- Coordinates: 37°56′51″N 47°51′05″E
- Country: Iran
- Province: East Azerbaijan
- County: Sarab
- District: Central
- Rural District: Sain

Population (2016)
  - Total: 304
- Time zone: UTC+3:30 (IRST)

Emam Chay (Persian: امام چاي) (Note: Also romanized as Emām Chāy) is a village in Sain Rural District of the Central District in Sarab County, East Azerbaijan province, Iran.

== Demographics ==
=== Population ===
At the time of the 2006 National Census, the village's population was 336 in 60 households. The following census in 2011 counted 349 people in 91 households. The 2016 census measured the population of the village as 304 people in 84 households.
