= Qareh Kanlu, East Azerbaijan =

Qareh Kanlu قره كانلو
- Village
- Location within Iran
- Coordinates: 38°03′33″N 47°47′08″E
- Country: Iran
- Province: East Azerbaijan
- County: Sarab
- Bakhsh: Central
- Rural District: Sain

Population (2006)
  - Total: 86
- Time zone: UTC+3:30 (IRST)
  - Summer (DST): UTC+4:30 (IRDT)

Qareh Kanlu (Persian: قره كانلو, also Romanized as Qareh Kānlū; also known as Gharekānlū) is a village in Sain Rural District, in the Central District of Sarab County, East Azerbaijan Province, Iran. At the 2006 census, its population was 86, in 16 families.
