= Bahreman, East Azerbaijan =

Village in East Azerbaijan province, Iran

Bahreman Persian: بهرمان
- Village
- Location within Iran
- Coordinates: 37°55′07″N 47°17′08″E
- Country: Iran
- Province: East Azerbaijan
- County: Sarab
- District: Central
- Rural District: Abarghan

Population (2016)
  - Total: 689
- Time zone: UTC+3:30 (IRST)

Bahreman (Persian: بهرمان) (Note: Also romanized as Bahrāmān and Bahremān) is a village in Abarghan Rural District of the Central District in Sarab County, East Azerbaijan province, Iran.

== Demographics ==
=== Population ===
At the time of the 2006 National Census, the village's population was 738 in 158 households. The following census in 2011 counted 768 people in 200 households. The 2016 census measured the population of the village as 689 people in 205 households.
