= Eslamabad, Sarab =

Village in East Azerbaijan province, Iran

Eslamabad Persian: اسلام اباد
- Village
- Location within Iran
- Coordinates: 37°59′22″N 47°36′24″E
- Country: Iran
- Province: East Azerbaijan
- County: Sarab
- District: Central
- Rural District: Aghmiyun

Population (2016)
  - Total: 1,205
- Time zone: UTC+3:30 (IRST)

Eslamabad (Persian: اسلام اباد) (Note: Also romanized as Eslāmābād; also known as Gerdeh Mahīn (گرده مهي)) is a village in Aghmiyun Rural District of the Central District in Sarab County, East Azerbaijan province, Iran.

== Demographics ==
=== Population ===
At the time of the 2006 National Census, the village's population was 1,256 in 315 households. The following census in 2011 counted 1,277 people in 342 households. The 2016 census measured the population of the village as 1,205 people in 368 households.
