= Abarghan, Sarab =

Village in East Azerbaijan province, Iran

Abarghan Persian: ابرغان
- Village
- Location within Iran
- Coordinates: 37°51′28″N 47°20′10″E
- Country: Iran
- Province: East Azerbaijan
- County: Sarab
- District: Central
- Rural District: Abarghan

Population (2016)
  - Total: 840
- Time zone: UTC+3:30 (IRST)

Abarghan (Persian: ابرغان) (Note: Also romanized as Abarghān) is a village in, and the capital of, Abarghan Rural District in the Central District of Sarab County, East Azerbaijan province, Iran.

== Demographics ==
=== Population ===
At the time of the 2006 National Census, the village's population was 1,301 in 315 households. The following census in 2011 counted 1,006 people in 321 households. The 2016 census measured the population of the village as 840 people in 291 households.
