= Asfestan, East Azerbaijan =

Village in East Azerbaijan province, Iran

Asfestan Persian: اسفستان
- Village
- Location within Iran
- Coordinates: 37°56′04″N 47°36′05″E
- Country: Iran
- Province: East Azerbaijan
- County: Sarab
- District: Central
- Rural District: Aghmiyun

Population (2016)
  - Total: 1,146
- Time zone: UTC+3:30 (IRST)

Asfestan (Persian: اسفستان) (Note: Also romanized as Asfestān) is a village in Aghmiyun Rural District of the Central District in Sarab County, East Azerbaijan province, Iran.

== Demographics ==
=== Population ===
At the time of the 2006 National Census, the village's population was 1,228 in 289 households. The following census in 2011 counted 1,247 people in 365 households. The 2016 census measured the population of the village as 1,146 people in 364 households.
