= Razliq =

Village in East Azerbaijan province, Iran

Razliq Persian: رازليق
- Village
- Location within Iran
- Coordinates: 38°00′20″N 47°32′59″E
- Country: Iran
- Province: East Azerbaijan
- County: Sarab
- District: Central
- Rural District: Razliq

Population (2016)
  - Total: 1,254
- Time zone: UTC+3:30 (IRST)

Razliq (Persian: رازليق) (Note: Also romanized as Rāzlīq) is a village in, and the capital of, Razliq Rural District in the Central District of Sarab County, East Azerbaijan province, Iran.

== Demographics ==
=== Language ===
The villagers of Razliq speak Azeri, are Turkish-Azarbaijani, and Shia Muslims since the 15th century, after the emergence of the Safavid Empire.

=== Population ===
At the time of the 2006 National Census, the village's population was 1,656 in 463 households. The following census in 2011 counted 1,372 people in 456 households. The 2016 census measured the population of the village as 1,254 people in 425 households.

== Economy ==
People's lifestyle has changed due to modernization in farming. The mechanization of tools has made working in agriculture easier.

=== Agriculture ===
Razliq's most important product is the cucumber, although crops such as potatoes, pumpkins, legumes and grains are also cultivated. Inhabitants turn most of the cucumbers into pickles and sell this product in Ardabil or Tabriz markets. Razliq's pickles are the most famous in Azerbaijan.

=== Chips factory ===
A chips factory has started its work in 2017, with 30 workers. The factory's product is sent to markets throughout Iran. All the consumables of the factory are generally prepared from the products of Razliq itself.

=== Animal husbandry ===
In this village, animals such as sheep and goats, but specifically cows, are raised both traditionally and industrially.
