= Qaleh Juq, Sarab =

Village in East Azerbaijan province, Iran

Qaleh Juq Persian: قلعه جوق
- Village
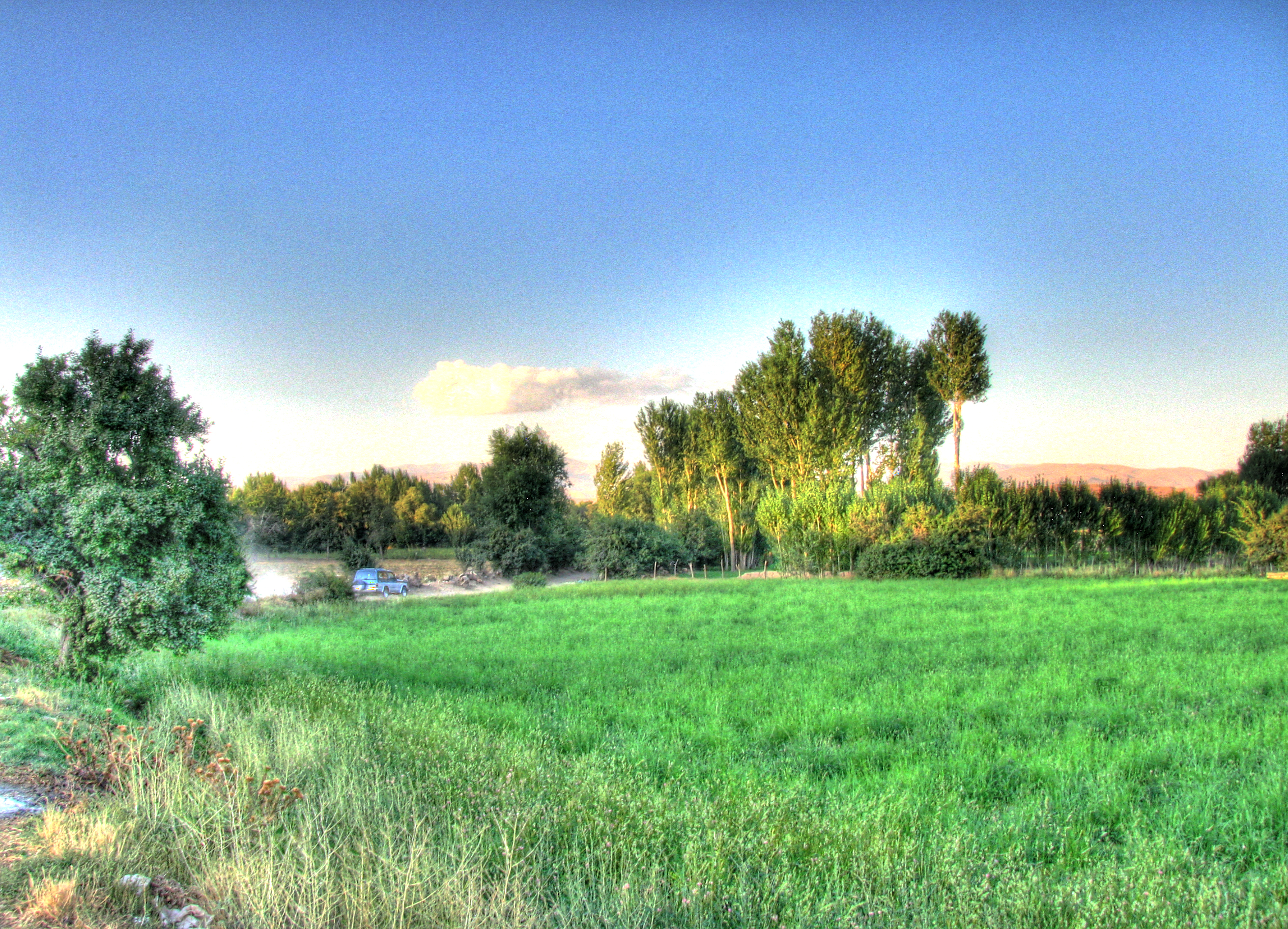

- Location within Iran
- Coordinates: 37°58′13″N 47°32′18″E
- Country: Iran
- Province: East Azerbaijan
- County: Sarab
- District: Central
- Rural District: Razliq

Population (2016)
  - Total: 2,129
- Time zone: UTC+3:30 (IRST)

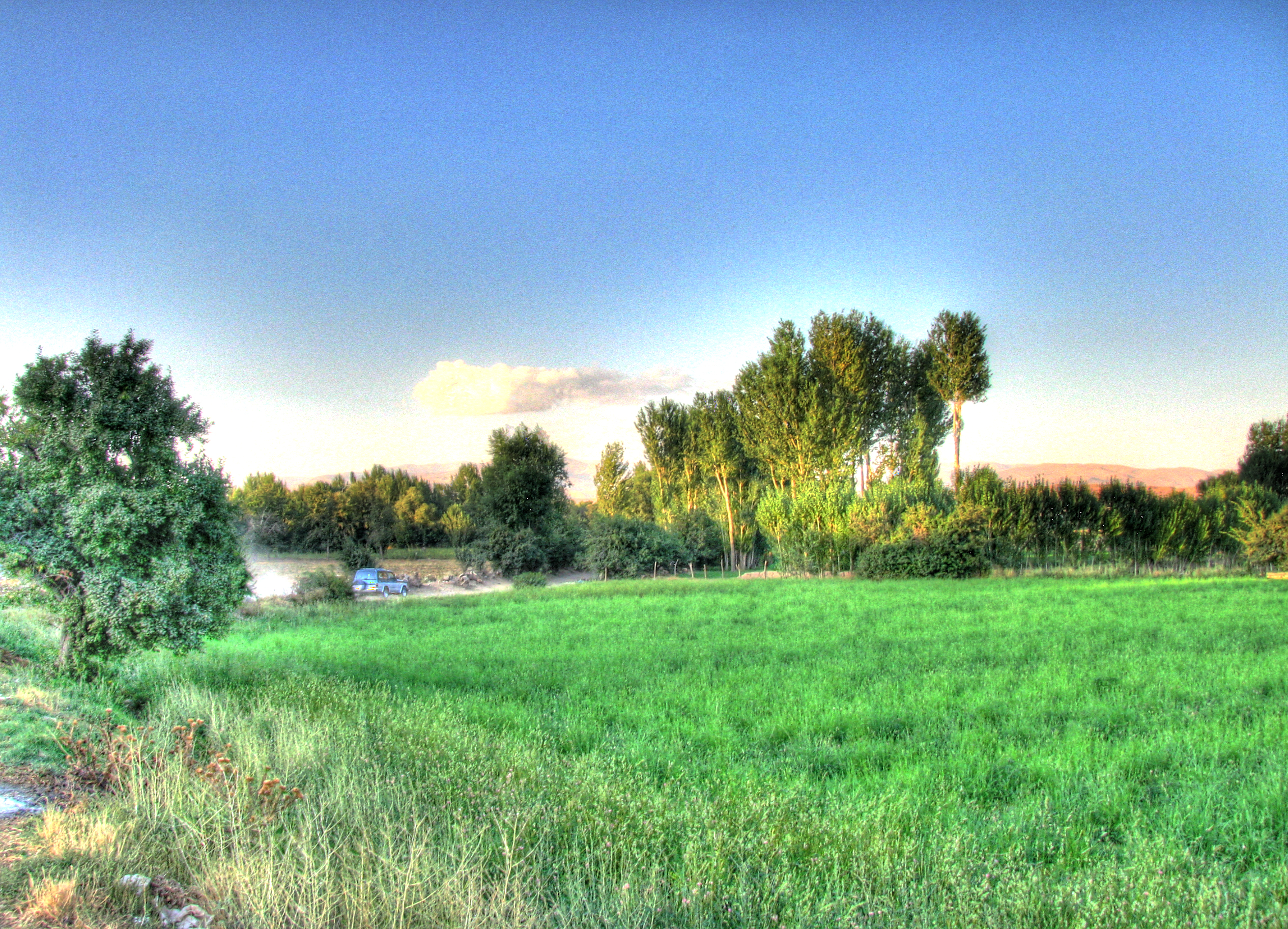
The landscape around Ghal'eh Jugh

Qaleh Juq (Persian: قلعه جوق) (Note: Also romanized as Qal‘eh Juq, Qal‘eh-ye Jūq and Ghal'eh Jugh) is a village in Razliq Rural District of the Central District in Sarab County, East Azerbaijan province, Iran.

== Demographics ==
=== Population ===
At the time of the 2006 National Census, the village's population was 2,185 in 568 households. The following census in 2011 counted 2,205 people in 658 households. The 2016 census measured the population of the village as 2,129 people in 664 households. It was the most populous village in its rural district.
