= Andarab, East Azerbaijan =

Village in East Azerbaijan province, Iran

Andarab Persian: اندراب
- Village
- Location within Iran
- Coordinates: 37°53′08″N 47°31′05″E
- Country: Iran
- Province: East Azerbaijan
- County: Sarab
- District: Central
- Rural District: Howmeh

Population (2016)
  - Total: 2,296
- Time zone: UTC+3:30 (IRST)

Andarab (Persian: اندراب) (Note: Also romanized as Andarāb) is a village in Howmeh Rural District of the Central District in Sarab County, East Azerbaijan province, Iran.

== Demographics ==
=== Population ===
At the time of the 2006 National Census, the village's population was 1,704 in 369 households. The following census in 2011 counted 2,114 people in 566 households. The 2016 census measured the population of the village as 2,296 people in 617 households.
