= Asbforushan =

Village in East Azerbaijan province, Iran

Asbforushan Persian: اسبفروشان
- Village
- Location within Iran
- Coordinates: 37°49′32″N 47°28′32″E
- Country: Iran
- Province: East Azerbaijan
- County: Sarab
- District: Central
- Rural District: Howmeh

Population (2016)
  - Total: 2,898
- Time zone: UTC+3:30 (IRST)

Asbforushan (Persian: اسبفروشان) (Note: Also romanized as Asbforūshān) is a village in, and the capital of, Howmeh Rural District in the Central District of Sarab County, East Azerbaijan province, Iran.

== Demographics ==
=== Population ===
At the time of the 2006 National Census, the village's population was 3,075 in 832 households. The following census in 2011 counted 2,974 people in 883 households. The 2016 census measured the population of the village as 2,898 people in 976 households. It was the most populous village in its rural district.
