= Bozgush =

Bozgush بزگوش
- Village
- Location within Iran
- Coordinates: 38°28′21″N 44°52′37″E
- Country: Iran
- Province: West Azerbaijan
- County: Khoy
- Bakhsh: Central
- Rural District: Rahal

Population (2006)
  - Total: 177
- Time zone: UTC+3:30 (IRST)
  - Summer (DST): UTC+4:30 (IRDT)

Bozgush (Persian: بزگوش, also Romanized as Bozgūsh) is a village in Rahal Rural District, in the Central District of Khoy County, West Azerbaijan Province, Iran. At the 2006 census, its population was 177, in 41 families.
