= Kalantari =

Kalantari is a surname. Notable people with the surname include:

- Ali Kalantari (born 1968), Iranian footballer and coach
- Ayoub Kalantari (born 1990), Iranian footballer
- Isa Kalantari (born 1952), Iranian politician, brother of Mousa
- Mousa Kalantari (1949–1981), Iranian politician
