= Asfastan, Qazvin =

Asfastan اسفستان
- Village
- Location within Iran
- Coordinates: 36°21′28″N 49°32′21″E
- Country: Iran
- Province: Qazvin
- County: Qazvin
- Bakhsh: Kuhin
- Rural District: Ilat-e Qaqazan-e Gharbi

Population (2006)
  - Total: 99
- Time zone: UTC+3:30 (IRST)
  - Summer (DST): UTC+4:30 (IRDT)

Asfastan (Persian: اسفستان, also Romanized as Asfastān; also known as Asbastār, Asbestān, Asbetsān, Asfatān, and Aspastan) is a village in Ilat-e Qaqazan-e Gharbi Rural District, Kuhin District, Qazvin County, Qazvin Province, Iran. At the 2006 census, its population was 99, in 31 families.
