= Amerghan-e Tus =

Amerghan-e Tus امرغان طوس
- Village
- Location within Iran
- Coordinates: 36°26′42″N 59°33′56″E
- Country: Iran
- Province: Razavi Khorasan
- County: Mashhad
- Bakhsh: Central
- Rural District: Tus

Population (2006)
  - Total: 433
- Time zone: UTC+3:30 (IRST)
  - Summer (DST): UTC+4:30 (IRDT)

Amerghan-e Tus (Persian: امرغان طوس, also Romanized as Amerghān-e Ţūs; also known as Abarghan, Abarqān-e Ţūs, and Amerqān-e Ţūs) is a village in Tus Rural District, in the Central District of Mashhad County, Razavi Khorasan Province, Iran. At the 2006 census, its population was 433, in 107 families.

== See also ==
- List of cities, towns and villages in Razavi Khorasan Province
