= Aghmiyun Rural District =

Rural district in East Azerbaijan province, Iran

Aghmiyun Rural District Persian: دهستان آغميون
- Rural District
- Location within Iran
- Coordinates: 38°00′N 47°39′E
- Country: Iran
- Province: East Azerbaijan
- County: Sarab
- District: Central
- Capital: Aghmiyun

Population (2016)
  - Total: 9,359
- Time zone: UTC+3:30 (IRST)

Aghmiyun Rural District (Persian: دهستان آغميون) is in the Central District of Sarab County, East Azerbaijan province, Iran. Its capital is the village of Aghmiyun.

== Demographics ==
=== Population ===
At the time of the 2006 National Census, the rural district's population was 10,481 in 2,635 households. There were 10,456 inhabitants in 2,768 households at the following census of 2011. The 2016 census measured the population of the rural district as 9,359 in 2,938 households. The most populous of its 22 villages was Aghmiyun, with 1,234 people.

=== Other villages in the rural district ===
- Asfestan
- Eslamabad
- Fargush
- Kadijan
- Sahzab
- Senziq
