= Abarghan Rural District =

Rural district in East Azerbaijan province, Iran

Abarghan Rural District Persian: دهستان ابرغان
- Rural District
- Location within Iran
- Coordinates: 37°52′N 47°18′E
- Country: Iran
- Province: East Azerbaijan
- County: Sarab
- District: Central
- Established: 1987
- Capital: Abarghan

Population (2016)
  - Total: 10,780
- Time zone: UTC+3:30 (IRST)

Abarghan Rural District (Persian: دهستان ابرغان) is in the Central District of Sarab County, East Azerbaijan province, Iran. Its capital is the village of Abarghan.

== Demographics ==
=== Population ===
At the time of the 2006 National Census, the rural district's population was 13,529 in 2,910 households. There were 12,239 inhabitants in 3,284 households at the following census of 2011. The 2016 census measured the population of the rural district as 10,780 in 3,206 households. The most populous of its 26 villages was Daman Jan, with 1,847 people.

=== Other villages in the rural district ===
- Bahreman
- Dambaran
- Darab
- Qezel Gechi
- Qushchi
