= Howmeh Rural District (Sarab County) =

Rural district in East Azerbaijan province, Iran

Howmeh Rural District Persian: دهستان حومه
- Rural District
- Location within Iran
- Coordinates: 37°51′N 47°31′E
- Country: Iran
- Province: East Azerbaijan
- County: Sarab
- District: Central
- Established: 1987
- Capital: Asbforushan

Population (2016)
  - Total: 13,734
- Time zone: UTC+3:30 (IRST)

Howmeh Rural District (Persian: دهستان حومه) is in the Central District of Sarab County, East Azerbaijan province, Iran. Its capital is the village of Asbforushan.

== Demographics ==
=== Population ===
At the time of the 2006 National Census, the rural district's population was 14,066 in 3,454 households. There were 14,069 inhabitants in 3,943 households at the following census of 2011. The 2016 census measured the population of the rural district as 13,734 in 4,190 households. The most populous of its 21 villages was Asbforushan, with 2,898 people.

=== Other villages in the rural district ===
- Andarab
- Bijand
- Heris
- Owghan
- Sardha
- Tazeh Kand
