= Sain Rural District =

Rural district in East Azerbaijan province, Iran

Sain Rural District Persian: دهستان صائين
- Rural District
- Location within Iran
- Coordinates: 38°04′N 47°48′E
- Country: Iran
- Province: East Azerbaijan
- County: Sarab
- District: Central
- Established: 1987
- Capital: Kalian

Population (2016)
  - Total: 2,938
- Time zone: UTC+3:30 (IRST)

Sain Rural District (Persian: دهستان صائين) is in the Central District of Sarab County, East Azerbaijan province, Iran. Its capital is the village of Kalian.

== Demographics ==
=== Population ===
At the time of the 2006 National Census, the rural district's population was 3,738 in 714 households. There were 3,467 inhabitants in 881 households at the following census of 2011. The 2016 census measured the population of the rural district as 2,938 in 824 households. The most populous of its 28 villages was Kalian, with 423 people.

=== Other villages in the rural district ===
- Asgarabad
- Emam Chay
- Qerkh Bolagh
