= Razliq Rural District =

Rural district in East Azerbaijan province, Iran

Razliq Rural District Persian: دهستان رازليق
- Rural District
- Location within Iran
- Coordinates: 38°05′N 47°32′E
- Country: Iran
- Province: East Azerbaijan
- County: Sarab
- District: Central
- Established: 1987
- Capital: Razliq

Population (2016)
  - Total: 9,183
- Time zone: UTC+3:30 (IRST)

Razliq Rural District (Persian: دهستان رازليق) is in the Central District of Sarab County, East Azerbaijan province, Iran. Its capital is the village of Razliq.

== Demographics ==
=== Population ===
At the time of the 2006 National Census, the rural district's population was 10,812 in 2,628 households. There were 10,040 inhabitants in 2,843 households at the following census of 2011. The 2016 census measured the population of the rural district as 9,183 in 2,830 households. The most populous of its 29 villages was Qaleh Juq, with 2,129 people.

=== Other villages in the rural district ===
- Chehgush
- Shireh Jin
- Yengejah
