= Central District (Sarab County) =

District in East Azerbaijan province, Iran

Central District (Sarab County) Persian: بخش مرکزی شهرستان سراب
- District
- Location within Iran
- Coordinates: 38°00′N 47°33′E
- Country: Iran
- Province: East Azerbaijan
- County: Sarab
- Capital: Sarab

Population (2016)
  - Total: 97,096
- Time zone: UTC+3:30 (IRST)

The Central District of Sarab County (Persian: بخش مرکزی شهرستان سراب) is in East Azerbaijan province, Iran. Its capital is the city of Sarab.

== Demographics ==
=== Population ===
At the time of the 2006 National Census, the district's population was 101,342 in 24,862 households. The following census in 2011 counted 101,446 people in 28,832 households. The 2016 census measured the population of the district as 97,096 inhabitants in 29,735 households.

=== Administrative divisions ===
Central District (Sarab County) Population
Administrative Divisions	2006	2011	2016
Abarghan RD	13,529	12,239	10,780
Aghmiyun RD	10,481	10,456	9,359
Howmeh RD	14,066	14,069	13,734
Molla Yaqub RD	6,659	6,329	6,071
Razliq RD	10,812	10,040	9,183
Sain RD	3,738	3,467	2,938
Sarab (city)	42,057	44,846	45,031
Total	101,342	101,446	97,096
RD = Rural District
