= Afşar =

Afşar, Afshar, or Avşar may refer to:

== People ==
- Afshar people, a branch of the Turkic Oghuz people
  - Afshar language, the Turkic language spoken by the people above
  - Afsharid dynasty, the Iranian dynasty founded by members of this people
  - Afshars of Urmia, a branch of the Afshar people centered in the Iranian city of Urmia
- Afşar (surname)

== Places ==
=== Afghanistan ===
- Afshar district, a district of Kabul

=== Armenia ===
- Avshar, Ararat, a town in the Ararat Province

=== Azerbaijan ===
- Avşar, Aghjabadi, a village and municipality in the Aghjabadi Rayon

=== Iran ===
- Arababad-e Afshar Rural District, an administrative division of Chaharbagh County, Alborz province
- Afshar-e Olya, a village in Kowsar County, Ardabil province
- Afshar, Jolfa, a village in Jolfa County, East Azerbaijan province
- Afshar, Meyaneh, a village in Meyaneh County, East Azerbaijan province
- Afshar, Sistan and Baluchestan, a village in Mehrestan County, Sistan and Baluchestan province
- Afshar Rural District, an administrative division of Takab County, West Azerbaijan province
- Afshar District, an administrative division of Khodabandeh County, Zanjan province
- Afsharlu, a village in Khodabandeh County, Zanjan province

=== Turkey ===
- Afşar, Bala, a town in the district of Balâ, Ankara Province
- Afşar, Bolu, a village in the district of Bolu, Bolu Province
- Afşar, Çerkeş
- Afşar, Dinar, a village in the district of Dinar, Afyonkarahisar Province
- Afşar, Elmalı, a village in the district of Elmalı, Antalya Province
- Afşar, Güdül, a village in the district of Güdül, Ankara Province
- Afşar, Kalecik, a village in the district of Kalecik, Ankara Province
- Avşar, Kargı
- Afşar, Mengen, a village in the district of Mengen, Bolu Province
- Afşar, Taşköprü, a village
- Afşar Dam, a dam in Manisa Province

== Other uses ==
- Afsar (1950 film), an Indian film
- Afsar (2018 film), an Indian film
- Afshar experiment, a controversial physics experiment
- Afshar Operation, a 1993 military operation in the Afshar district of Kabul, Afghanistan
- Afshar rugs, a handwoven rug style
