= Afşar (surname) =

Afşar is a surname derived from Turkish. It has several variants such as Afshar and Avşar. Notable people with the surname include:

- Allahverdi Afshar, Iranian painter, active from 1815 until after 1825
- Amīr Aṣlān Afshār (1919–2021), Iranian diplomat and politician
- Amir Khosrow Afshar (1919–1999), Iranian diplomat and former foreign minister
- Ebrahim Afshar (died 1749), Shah of Persia during the Afsharid Empire
- Esin Afşar (1936–2011), Turkish singer and stage actress
- Haleh Afshar, Baroness Afshar (1944–2022), Iranian British life peer in the House of Lords
- Hamid Ullah Afsar (1895–1974), Indian Urdu poet and writer
- Hoda Afshar (born 1983), Iranian-Australian photographer and artist
- Hülya Avşar (born 1963), Turkish actress, singer, and businesswoman
- Iraj Afshar (1925–2011), Iranian historian and scholar
- Jamshid Afshar, Iranian fighter pilot
- Kamran Afshar Naderi (born 1959), Iranian architect
- Kerim Afşar (1930–2003), Turkish actor
- Mahnaz Afshar (born 1977), Iranian actress
- Nader Shah Afshar (1688–1747), Shah of Iran, founder of an Iranian empire and the Afsharid dynasty
- Nazak Afshar, French-Iranian woman imprisoned in Iran
- Shahriar Afshar (born 1971), Iranian-American physicist

== See also ==
- Afşar (disambiguation)
