= Nahiyeh, East Azerbaijan =

Nahiyeh ناحيه
- Village
- Location within Iran
- Coordinates: 38°14′42″N 47°11′51″E
- Country: Iran
- Province: East Azerbaijan
- County: Heris
- Bakhsh: Central
- Rural District: Khanamrud

Population (2006)
  - Total: 195
- Time zone: UTC+3:30 (IRST)
  - Summer (DST): UTC+4:30 (IRDT)

Nahiyeh (Persian: ناحيه, also Romanized as Nāḩīyeh; also known as Nāhīsh) is a village in Khanamrud Rural District, in the Central District of Heris County, East Azerbaijan Province, Iran. At the 2006 census, its population was 195, in 42 families.
