= Asb Khan =

Asb Khan اسبخان
- Village
- Location within Iran
- Coordinates: 38°19′50″N 46°58′03″E
- Country: Iran
- Province: East Azerbaijan
- County: Heris
- Bakhsh: Central
- Rural District: Bedevostan-e Sharqi

Population (2006)
  - Total: 103
- Time zone: UTC+3:30 (IRST)
  - Summer (DST): UTC+4:30 (IRDT)

Asb Khan (Persian: اسبخان, also Romanized as Asb Khān; also known as Asp-e Khān and Aspikhan) is a village in Bedevostan-e Sharqi Rural District, in the Central District of Heris County, East Azerbaijan Province, Iran. At the 2006 census, its population was 103, in 24 families.
