= Pran =

Pran most often refers to prāṇa, the concept of a "life force" in Hindu philosophy.

Pran may also refer to:

== People ==
- Pran Kishore Kaul, Kashmiri actor
- Pran Nath (disambiguation)
  - Pran Nath (musician) (1918–1996), Hindustani classical singer
  - Pran Nath (physicist) (born 1939), Indian-American physicist
  - Pran Nath Lekhi (1924/1925–2010), Indian lawyer
  - Pran Nath Thapar (1906–1975), Indian military commander
- Pran Nevile (1922–2018), Indian writer
- Pran Kumar Sharma (1938–2014), commonly known as Pran, Indian cartoonist
- Pran (actor) (1920–2013), born Pran Krishan Sikand, Indian film actor
- Dith Pran (1942–2008), Cambodian photojournalist, subject of The Killing Fields

== Places ==
- Pranburi (disambiguation), several places in Thailand
- Pran Buri District, district in Prachuap Khiri Khan Province, Thailand

== Other ==
- PRAN-RFL Group, a Bangladeshi food-products corporation
- Pran of Albania, 1929 novel by Elizabeth Miller

== See also ==
- Paran (disambiguation)
