= Zanjan rug =

Zanjan rug or Zenjan rug is the handmade Iranian carpet from Zanjan.

== See also ==
- Heriz rug
- Tabriz rug
