= Harzeh Varz =

Harzeh Varz هرزه ورز
- Village
- Location within Iran
- Coordinates: 38°12′26″N 47°09′51″E
- Country: Iran
- Province: East Azerbaijan
- County: Heris
- Bakhsh: Central
- Rural District: Khanamrud

Population (2006)
  - Total: 147
- Time zone: UTC+3:30 (IRST)
  - Summer (DST): UTC+4:30 (IRDT)

Harzeh Varz (Persian: هرزه ورز, also Romanized as Harzehvarz) is a village in Khanamrud Rural District, in the Central District of Heris County, East Azerbaijan Province, Iran. At the 2006 census, its population was 147, in 25 families.
