= Zerna =

Zerna may refer to:

- Zerna Sharp (1889-1981), American author
- Pizzo Zerna, mountain of Italy
- Zerna, Iran, city in East Azerbaijan Province, Iran
