= Paran, Iran =

Paran (Persian: پرن or پاران) in Iran may refer to:

- Paran, East Azerbaijan (پرن - Paran), a village
- Paran, Isfahan (پاران - Pārān), a city
- Paran, Mazandaran (پرن - Paran), a village

== See also ==
- Paran (disambiguation)
