= Bedevostan =

Bedevostan (Persian: بدوستان) may refer to:

- Bedevostan-e Gharbi Rural District
- Bedevostan-e Sharqi Rural District
