= Khaneqah, Heris =

Village in East Azerbaijan province, Iran

Khaneqah Persian: خانقاه
- Village
- Location within Iran
- Coordinates: 38°12′22″N 47°12′31″E
- Country: Iran
- Province: East Azerbaijan
- County: Heris
- District: Central
- Rural District: Khanamrud

Population (2016)
  - Total: 289
- Time zone: UTC+3:30 (IRST)

Khaneqah (Persian: خانقاه) (Note: Also romanized as Khāneqāh) is a village in Khanamrud Rural District of the Central District in Heris County, East Azerbaijan province, Iran.

== Demographics ==
=== Population ===
At the time of the 2006 National Census, the village's population was 420 in 97 households. The following census in 2011 counted 393 people in 92 households. The 2016 census measured the population of the village as 289 people in 96 households.
