= Andis, Iran =

Andis (Persian: انديس) may refer to:

- Andis, East Azerbaijan
- Andis, Markazi
