= Tazeh Kand-e Olya, Heris =

Tazeh Kand-e Olya تازه كندعليا
- Village
- Location within Iran
- Coordinates: 38°15′38″N 47°11′41″E
- Country: Iran
- Province: East Azerbaijan
- County: Heris
- Bakhsh: Central
- Rural District: Khanamrud

Population (2006)
  - Total: 121
- Time zone: UTC+3:30 (IRST)
  - Summer (DST): UTC+4:30 (IRDT)

Tazeh Kand-e Olya (Persian: تازه كندعليا, also Romanized as Tāzeh Kand-e ‘Olyā; also known as Tāzeh Kand and Tāzeh Kand-e Bālā) is a village in Khanamrud Rural District, in the Central District of Heris County, East Azerbaijan Province, Iran. At the 2016 census, its population was 177, in 33 families.
