= Borchaly =

Borchaly may refer to:

- Borchaly uezd
- Borchaly sultanate
- Borchaly (carpet)
