= Nujeh Deh, Heris =

Village in East Azerbaijan province, Iran

Nujeh Deh Persian: نوجه ده
- Village
- Location within Iran
- Coordinates: 38°12′00″N 47°10′52″E
- Country: Iran
- Province: East Azerbaijan
- County: Heris
- District: Central
- Rural District: Khanamrud

Population (2016)
  - Total: 415
- Time zone: UTC+3:30 (IRST)

Nujeh Deh (Persian: نوجه ده) (Note: Also romanized as Nūjeh Deh) is a village in Khanamrud Rural District of the Central District in Heris County, East Azerbaijan province, Iran.

== Demographics ==
=== Population ===
At the time of the 2006 National Census, the village's population was 430 in 102 households. The following census in 2011 counted 456 people in 111 households. The 2016 census measured the population of the village as 415 people in 126 households.
