= Tazeh Kand, Heris =

Village in East Azerbaijan province, Iran

Tazeh Kand Persian: تازه كند
- Village
- Location within Iran
- Coordinates: 38°12′17″N 47°04′48″E
- Country: Iran
- Province: East Azerbaijan
- County: Heris
- District: Central
- Rural District: Baruq

Population (2016)
  - Total: 16
- Time zone: UTC+3:30 (IRST)

Tazeh Kand (Persian: تازه كند) (Note: Also romanized as Tāzeh Kand) is a village in Baruq Rural District (Note: Merger of Mehranrud-e Shomali and Zarnaq Rural Districts in 2000) of the Central District in Heris County, East Azerbaijan province, Iran.

== Demographics ==
=== Population ===
At the time of the 2006 National Census, the village's population was 18 in six households. The following census in 2011 counted 14 people in four households. The 2016 census measured the population of the village as 16 people in six households.
