= Heriz rug =

Type of Persian carpet

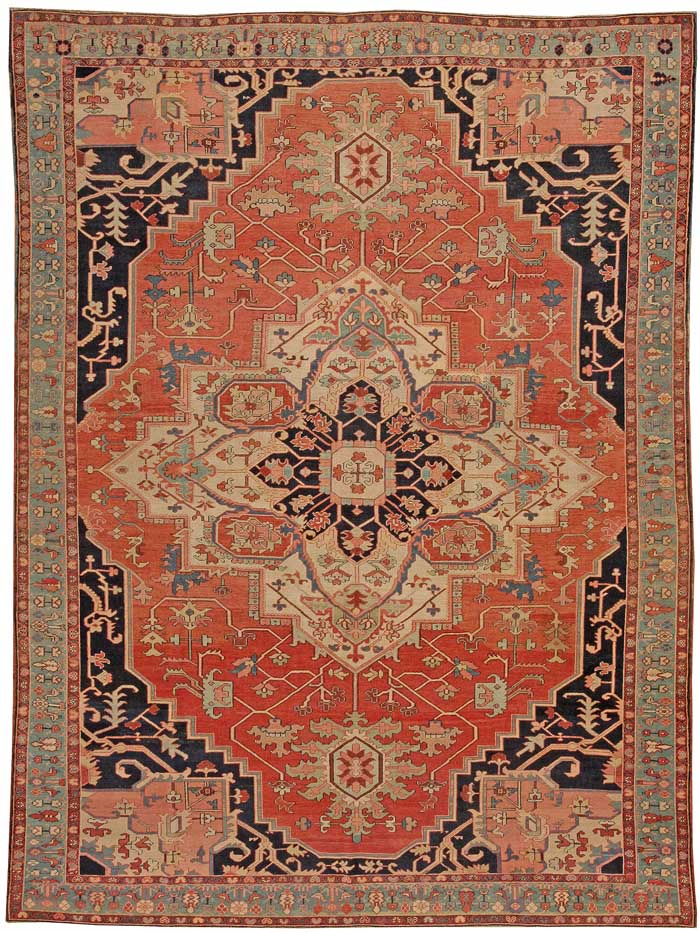
Antique Heriz Serapi carpet

Heriz rugs are Persian rugs from the area of Heris in northwest Iran, northeast of Tabriz. Such rugs are produced in the village of the same name in the slopes of Mount Sabalan. Heriz carpets are durable and hard-wearing and they can last for generations. 19th century examples of such carpets are often found on sale by major auction houses in United States and Europe. Part of the reason for the toughness of Heriz carpets is that Mount Sabalan sits on a major deposit of copper. Traces of copper in the drinking water of sheep produces high quality wool that is far more resilient than wool from other areas.

Heriz rug weavers often make them in geometric, bold patterns with a large medallion dominating the field. Such designs are traditional and often woven from memory.

Similar rugs from the neighbouring towns and villages of the Heriz region are Afshar, Mehraban, Sarab, Bakhshaish, Zarnaq and Gorevan. The grades of these rugs are primarily based on village name. Serapis, for example, have been considered the finest grade of Heriz since the beginning of the 20th century.

Heriz rugs are of coarse construction. The rugs range from 30 kpsi on the low end to 100–110 kpsi on the high end. It is rare to see a rug over 100 kpsi that would look like an authentic Heriz unless it is an antique silk Heriz.

== Gallery ==
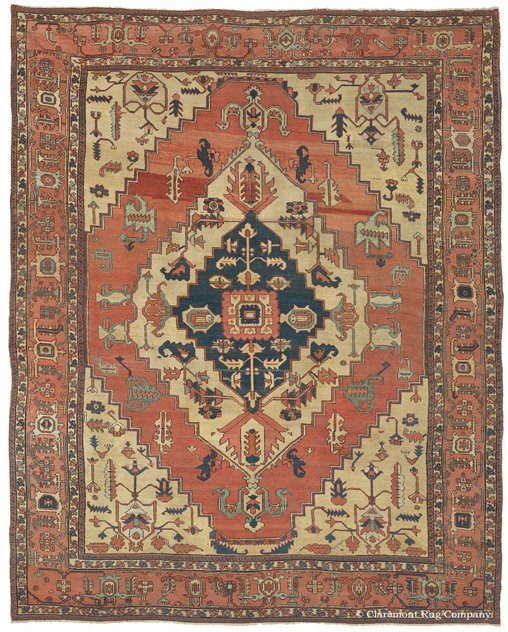
Antique Serapi carpet, circa 1875

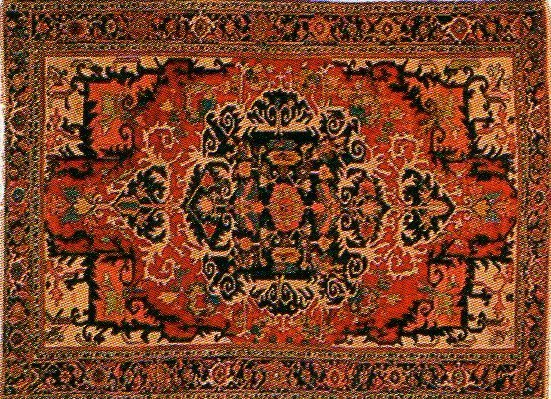
Heriz carpet

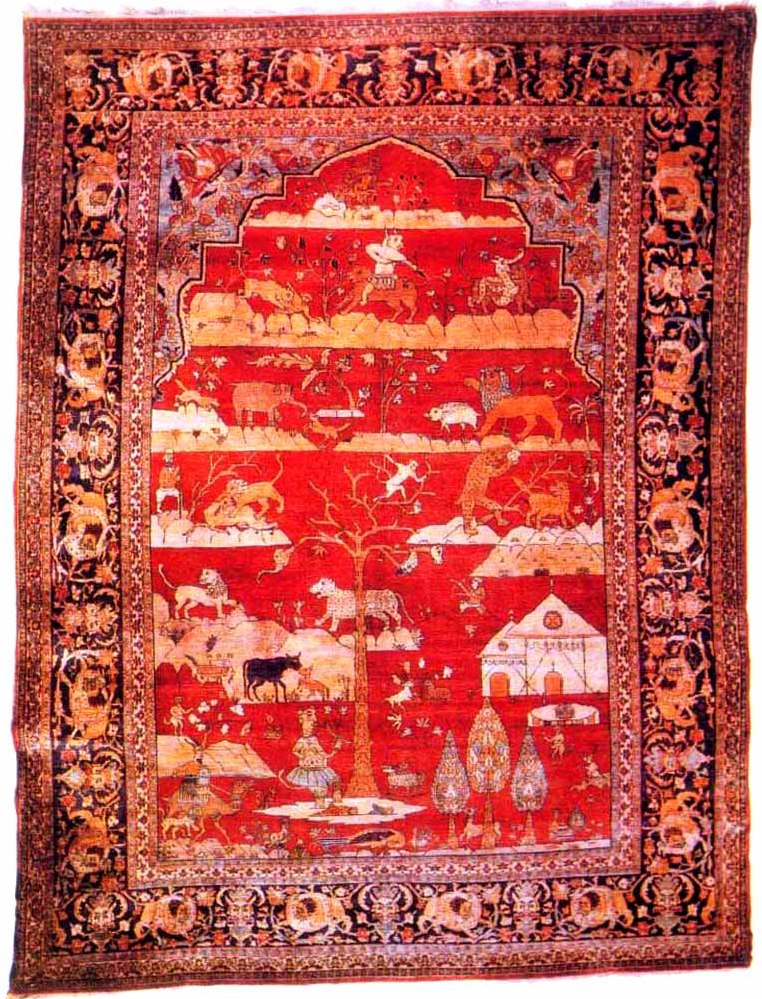
Heriz carpet vaq-vaq

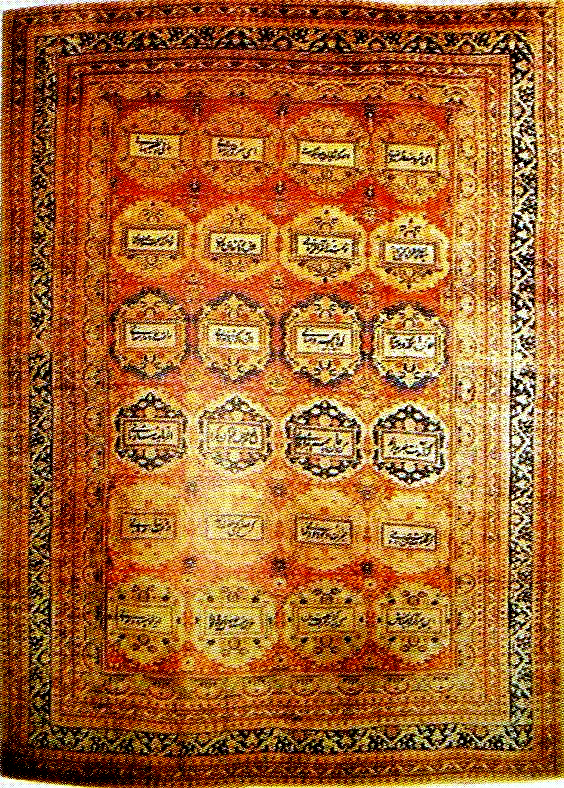
Heriz carpet

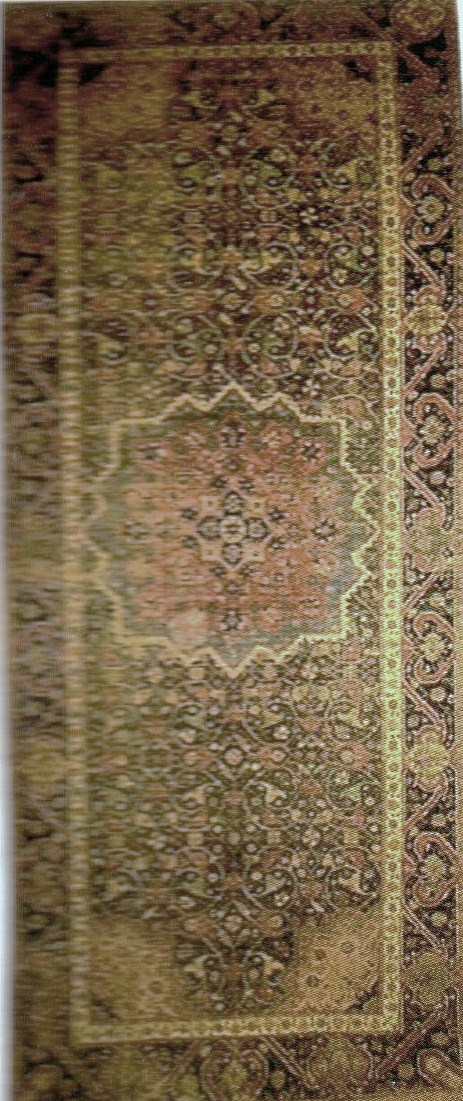
Heriz carpet
