= Gowaravan =

Village in East Azerbaijan province, Iran

Gowaravan Persian: گواروان
- Village
- Location within Iran
- Coordinates: 38°15′37″N 47°10′15″E
- Country: Iran
- Province: East Azerbaijan
- County: Heris
- District: Central
- Rural District: Khanamrud

Population (2016)
  - Total: 796
- Time zone: UTC+3:30 (IRST)

Gowaravan (Persian: گواروان) (Note: Also known as Gorāvān, Gowrāvān, and Gūrāvān) is a village in Khanamrud Rural District of the Central District in Heris County, East Azerbaijan province, Iran.

== Demographics ==
=== Population ===
At the time of the 2006 National Census, the village's population was 768 in 179 households. The following census in 2011 counted 858 people in 206 households. The 2016 census measured the population of the village as 796 people in 222 households. It was the most populous village in its rural district.
