= Qezeljeh-ye Kharabeh =

Village in East Azerbaijan province, Iran

Qezeljeh-ye Kharabeh Persian: قزلجه خرابه
- Village
- Location within Iran
- Coordinates: 38°10′49″N 47°06′17″E
- Country: Iran
- Province: East Azerbaijan
- County: Heris
- District: Central
- Rural District: Baruq

Population (2016)
  - Total: 82
- Time zone: UTC+3:30 (IRST)

Qezeljeh-ye Kharabeh (Persian: قزلجه خرابه) (Note: Also romanized as Qezeljeh Kharābeh and Qezeljeh-ye Kharābeh; also known as Qezeljeh and Qezeljeh-ye Zarīn (قزلجه زرين)) is a village in Baruq Rural District (Note: Merger of Mehranrud-e Shomali and Zarnaq Rural Districts in 2000) of the Central District in Heris County, East Azerbaijan province, Iran.

== Demographics ==
=== Population ===
At the time of the 2006 National Census, the village's population was 100 in 24 households. The following census in 2011 counted 60 people in 17 households. The 2016 census recorded the village's population as 82 people in 25 households.
