= Minaq =

Village in East Azerbaijan province, Iran

Minaq Persian: مينق
- Village
- Location within Iran
- Coordinates: 38°16′35″N 46°58′47″E
- Country: Iran
- Province: East Azerbaijan
- County: Heris
- District: Central
- Rural District: Bedevostan-e Sharqi

Population (2016)
  - Total: 826
- Time zone: UTC+3:30 (IRST)

Minaq (Persian: مينق) (Note: Also romanized as Meynaq and Mīnaq; also known as Meyna, Mīna, and Minar) is a village in Bedevostan-e Sharqi Rural District of the Central District in Heris County, East Azerbaijan province, Iran.

== Demographics ==
=== Population ===
At the time of the 2006 National Census, the village's population was 815 in 195 households. The following census in 2011 counted 901 people in 245 households. The 2016 census measured the population of the village as 826 people in 248 households.
