= Pharan (village) =

Coordinates: 28°42′45″N 33°36′43″E

Pharan (today Firan, arabic فيران DMG Fīrān) is a village in the South of the Sinai Peninsula (Egypt), located approximately 40 km from the coast and 50 km from El Tor, the modern name of the ancient Raithu.

== History ==
According to ancient tradition, Pharan, which was identified as the biblical Rephidim , was the site of the battle between the Israelites and the Amalek , who were blocking their passage. This battle is mentioned in Exodus 17, 10–15. Judging by coins found in the area, the settlement can be traced back to the 1st century BC. It therefore ran parallel to the Nabataean migration to Palestine, and for that reason, the Pharanites are considered a people related to the Nabataeans. Around the middle of the 4th century AD, the population of the city was Christianized and later that century, was declared a bishop's see. In the two or three generations after the Islamic conquest of the Sinai peninsula 639 AD, the inhabitants gave up the city of Pharan and likely became nomads. After the removal of the last ecumenical bishop following the Third Council of Constantinople in 681 AD, the episcopal office went to the Abbot of Saint Catherine's Monastery, who holds it to this day. The diocese was fused with the neighboring diocese of Raithu into the Church of Sinai, which encompasses the whole Sinai peninsula. In the Latin Church, the diocese was rebuilt in 1933 as the Titular See of Pharan of the Roman Catholic Church.

== See also ==
- Paran
