= Garachop carpet =

Type of Kazakh carpet

The Garachop carpets are pile-woven carpets belonging to the Gazakh group of the Ganja-Gazakh type. The name is derived from several villages located about 20 kilometers northwest of Gazakh, in what is now Republic of Georgia, where these carpets have traditionally been produced. The term "Garachop" collectively refers to the villages of Mughanli, Lambali, Tullar, Gambali, and Duzagram in the former Mughanly region, which historically has been inhabited by ethnic Azerbaijanis. These villages, especially Lambali, Mughanly, and Tullar, are key centers of the Gazakh carpet weaving tradition. In recent times, Garachop carpets continue to be woven in regions of Georgia such as Bolnisi, Marneuli, and Dmanisi, which have Azerbaijani populations. The name "Garachop" stems from the word "gara," meaning large, and "chop," referring to a native place or area, reflecting the local origin of these carpets.

== General information ==
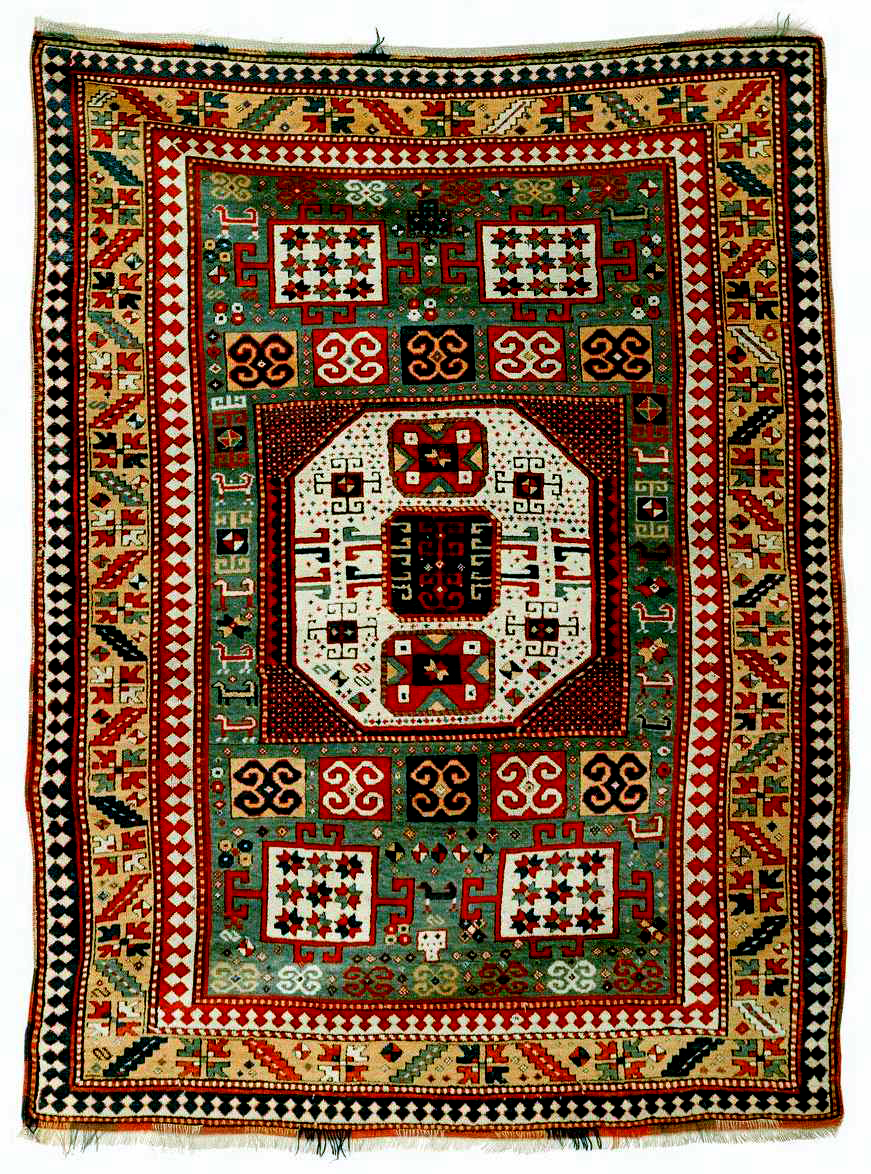
Green Ground Karachopt Kazak Rug Sotheby's.

The name of this carpet of the Gazakh group of the Ganja-Gazakh type is related with the names of several villages located 20 km northwest of Gazakh, in the territory of present-day Georgia. The word Garachop in the aggregate referred to the villages of Mughanli, Lambali, Tullar, Gambali and Duzagram in the former Mughanly region inhabited by the ethnic Azerbaijanis. These villages, especially Lambali, Mughanly and Tullar are the main centres of the Gazakh carpet weaving group. The Borchali carpet weaving centre is closely related to the mentioned villages. The carpets woven in this area are also known as Garabirchak. As per the book Carpet Weavers of the Gazakh-Borchali Region by Vidadi Muradov, the Garachop carpets are still woven in Bolnisi (Choruk Gamarli), Marneuli (Sarvan) and Dmanisi (Bashkechid) regions in the territory of Georgia, inhabited by the Azerbaijanis. According to Book of Dede Korkut, the word gara means large, chop means native place/area or intention (about something) referring to local people.

== Artistic analysis ==
The Garachop carpets of the 19-20th centuries are of simple artistic design. In rare cases, high-quality and fine carpets woven upon a special order can be found. The border stripes surrounding the intermediary field of the Garachop carpets are identical to those of the carpets Ganja and Gazakh while the green central field is more typical for the Garachop carpets. The Garachop carpet has a unique and celebrated artistic composition which consists of an intermediary field and border. The upper part of the central field symmetrically repeats at the bottom. The centre is filled with the large square medallion covering 1/3 of the carpet. Inside the medallion there is an eight-pointed star on the background with an armour-shaped ornament. Inside the star there is a small eight-pointed medallion, above and below there are two pairs of ram horns in a square and squares with horn-shaped protrudings along the four sides. The upper and lower parts of the central field have several different-sized rectangles. The largest ones are depicted in four corners of the central field. As a rule, their inner part is decorated with 9 eight-pointed flowers, the outer part – with the stylized horns called garmagli (with hooks). The squares between the squares mentioned above have the stylized image of the tree of life. The rest of the central field is filled with the two pairs of ram horns ornament. The ornament is depicted inside and outside the square. The border consists of three parts: wide central border (sometimes called middle or mother border) and narrow borders on its left and right. The central border is formed by the repetition of elements typical for this carpet and is of several types. The most typical element is the depiction of four joint arrows in the centre together with two pairs of ram horns and toothed rhombus ornaments. The carpet also uses the border called mashal (torch) or shamdanli (with candlestick). The most typical small border of the Garachop carpet is called mollabashi (head of Mullah), the rarer border is formed by three-pointed motif, sometimes meander border can also be seen. As a rule, the main elements of this carpet are placed symmetrically, while the filling elements are placed asymmetrically.

The central field of the Garachop carpets is mainly decorated with a large eight-pointed medallion. The identical small medallions surrounded with hook-shaped protrusions are placed in the corners of the central field. The hooked protrusions extend along the inner line in the central medallion, in the small medallions they interchange along the outer line. The inner field with the white background has a number of small star-shaped patterns.

Colouring. The central field of the Garachop carpets is usually green, red or light-blue. The eight-pointed ornament in the central medallion, the square medallions in four corners of the medallion and the central border are usually depicted on the white background.

Semantics. The four-cornered carpet is the projection of the world, the centre of the carpet is its most sacred part. The elements in the centre and the most used elements bear the main semantics of the carpet. A pair of joint ram horns, rhombus with two or four hooks, square, 9 eight-pointed stars are the typical motifs of this carpet.

9 eight-pointed stars. As a rule, the large square medallions in four corners of the Garachop carpets always have 9 eight-pointed stars inside. Repetition of these stars in the medallions is the typological feature of the Garachop carpet. It is very important to analyse the role of the number "9", since the amount of the stars bear the semantic meaning. The Turkic peoples consider "9" to be a sacred number.

== Technical features ==
The Garachop carpets are mainly medium-sized. The density of these carpets is 26x26 knots – 35x35 knots per square decimeter. One square meter has from 68000 up to 120000 knots with the pile height 5-8 millimeters.

== In the foreign museum and collections ==
The composition of the 18th-century carpet at inventory number E.100 preserved at the Istanbul Carpet Museum reminds of the sketch of the Garachop carpet. The size of the carpet is 205x145 cm, weaving technique is called gordast. It was donated to the museum from the warehouse of the Yeni Cami mosque. The museum labeling presents it as an example from the northeast Anatolia, but the geometrical-shaped medallion in the centre of the carpet proves that it was woven based on the centuries-old classical artistic tradition of the Gazakh carpet school. The four small auxiliary medallions on the white background in the corners of the intermediary field and stars inside them embody the artistic traditions of the Garachop carpet.
