= Nahran, East Azerbaijan =

Village in East Azerbaijan province, Iran

Nahran Persian: نهران
- Village
- Location within Iran
- Coordinates: 38°12′06″N 47°11′42″E
- Country: Iran
- Province: East Azerbaijan
- County: Heris
- District: Central
- Rural District: Khanamrud

Population (2016)
  - Total: 328
- Time zone: UTC+3:30 (IRST)

Nahran (Persian: نهران) (Note: Also romanized as Nahrān) is a village in Khanamrud Rural District of the Central District in Heris County, East Azerbaijan province, Iran.

== Demographics ==
=== Population ===
At the time of the 2006 National Census, the village's population was 357 in 82 households. The following census in 2011 counted 338 people in 82 households. The 2016 census measured the population of the village as 328 people in 104 households.
