= Namrur =

Village in East Azerbaijan province, Iran

Namrur Persian: نمرور
- Village
- Location within Iran
- Coordinates: 38°17′44″N 46°55′56″E
- Country: Iran
- Province: East Azerbaijan
- County: Heris
- District: Central
- Rural District: Bedevostan-e Sharqi

Population (2016)
  - Total: 1,424
- Time zone: UTC+3:30 (IRST)

Namrur (Persian: نمرور) (Note: Also romanized as Namarūr, Namarvar, Namroor, and Namrūr; also known as Nahār Khūrān, Nām Āvāran, and Namrūd) is a village in Bedevostan-e Sharqi Rural District of the Central District in Heris County, East Azerbaijan province, Iran.

== Demographics ==
=== Population ===
At the time of the 2006 National Census, the village's population was 1,167 in 300 households. The following census in 2011 counted 1,313 people in 370 households. The 2016 census measured the population of the village as 1,424 people in 424 households. It was the most populous village in its rural district.
