= Baruc (disambiguation) =

Baruc is a 6th-century Welsh saint

Baruc may also refer to:

== People ==
- Baruc Nsue (born 1984), Equatoguinean footballer

== Other ==
- Baruc (electoral ward), Welsh electoral ward

== See also ==
- Baruq (disambiguation)
