= Maqsudlu, Iran =

Village in East Azerbaijan province, Iran

Maqsudlu Persian: مقصودلو
- Village
- Location within Iran
- Coordinates: 38°16′01″N 47°01′30″E
- Country: Iran
- Province: East Azerbaijan
- County: Heris
- District: Central
- Rural District: Bedevostan-e Sharqi

Population (2016)
  - Total: 799
- Time zone: UTC+3:30 (IRST)

Maqsudlu (Persian: مقصودلو) (Note: Also romanized as Maqşūdlū) is a village in, and the capital of, Bedevostan-e Sharqi Rural District in the Central District of Heris County, East Azerbaijan province, Iran.

== Demographics ==
=== Population ===
At the time of the 2006 National Census, the village's population was 614 in 150 households. The following census in 2011 counted 734 people in 209 households. The 2016 census measured the population of the village as 799 people in 256 households.
