= Baruq (disambiguation) =

Baruq is a city in West Azerbaijan Province, Iran.

Baruq (Persian: باروق) may also refer to:

- Baruq, Ardabil
- Baruq, East Azerbaijan
- Baruq, South Khorasan
- Baruq County, in West Azerbaijan province
- Baruq District, in West Azerbaijan province
- Baruq Rural District (disambiguation)
