= Karam Javan =

Village in East Azerbaijan province, Iran

Karam Javan Persian: كرم جوان
- Village
- Location within Iran
- Coordinates: 38°04′51″N 47°02′58″E
- Country: Iran
- Province: East Azerbaijan
- County: Heris
- District: Central
- Rural District: Baruq

Population (2016)
  - Total: 817
- Time zone: UTC+3:30 (IRST)

Karam Javan (Persian: كرم جوان) (Note: Also romanized as Karam Javān; also known as Karīmjavān) is a village in Baruq Rural District (Note: Merger of Mehranrud-e Shomali and Zarnaq Rural Districts in 2000) of the Central District in Heris County, East Azerbaijan province, Iran.

== Demographics ==
=== Population ===
At the time of the 2006 National Census, the village's population was 695 in 172 households. The following census in 2011 counted 791 people in 192 households. The 2016 census measured the population of the village as 817 people in 285 households.
