= Hiq =

Hiq, HIQ, Hiaq or Hiyqa (Persian: هيق) may refer to:

- Hiq, Ardabil (حيق - Ḩīq)
- Hiq, Heris (هيق - Hīq), East Azerbaijan Province
- Hiaq, Khvajeh (هيق - Hīaq), Heris County, East Azerbaijan Province

== See also ==
- Hi-Q (disambiguation)
