= Tazeh Kand-e Olya =

Tazeh Kand-e Olya (Persian: تازه كندعليا) may refer to:

- Tazeh Kand-e Olya, Heris
- Tazeh Kand-e Olya, Maragheh
