= Barazin, Heris =

Village in East Azerbaijan province, Iran

Barazin Persian: برازين
- Village
- Location within Iran
- Coordinates: 38°16′17″N 47°06′27″E
- Country: Iran
- Province: East Azerbaijan
- County: Heris
- District: Central
- Rural District: Bedevostan-e Sharqi

Population (2016)
  - Total: 806
- Time zone: UTC+3:30 (IRST)

Barazin (Persian: برازين) (Note: Also romanized as Barāzīn; also known as Burazi and Burazy) is a village in Bedevostan-e Sharqi Rural District of the Central District in Heris County, East Azerbaijan province, Iran.

== Demographics ==
=== Population ===
At the time of the 2006 National Census, the village's population was 898 in 175 households. The following census in 2011 counted 868 people in 202 households. The 2016 census measured the population of the village as 806 people in 222 households.
