= Abd al-Rahim Aqiqi Bakhshayishi =

Iranian religious writer

- عبدالرحیم عقیقی بخشایشی
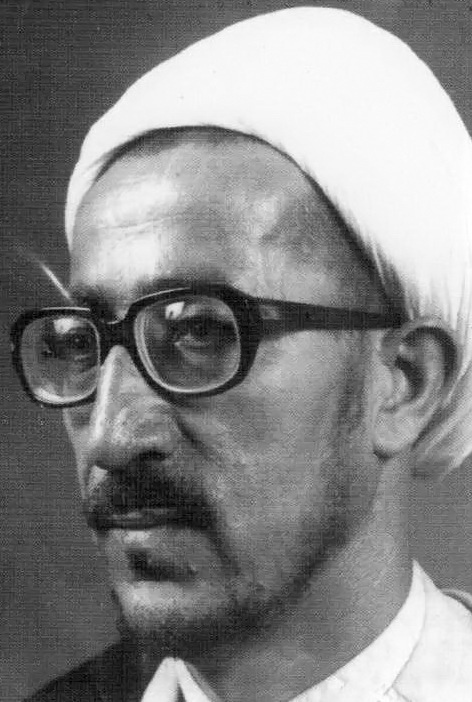
- Aqiqi Bakhshayishi, early 1970s
- Born: 1942; Bakhshayesh, Third province, Imperial State of Iran
- Died: April 5, 2012 (aged 70); Qom, Islamic Republic of Iran
- Resting place: Qom
- Occupations: Islamic jurist; writer; journalist; translator; academic
- Writing career
- Language: Azerbaijani, Arabic and Persian
- Genre: Religious literature
- Subjects: Biography, Religious history

Abd al-Rahim Aqiqi Bakhshayishi (South Azerbaijani: عبدالرحیم عقیقی بخشایشی, romanized: ʿAbd al-Raḥīm ʿAqīqī Bakhshāyishī; 1942 – 5 April 2012) was an Iranian Islamic jurist, religious writer, journalist and translator, widely known for his biographies of Twelver Shia scholars. Born in Bakhshayesh village of Heris County to an Azeri farmer family. He completed his religious studies in Qom with prominent scholars and graduated from Tehran University in 1971. From religious journalism, he started his independent writing and activities in 1961. A pro-Khomeini during 1979 revolution, Aqiqi was also active in the Islam Da'wah as a Twelver Shia faqih. He died in Qom at the age of seventy and left many works and translations from Arabic to Persian.

== Biography ==
Abd al-Rahim bin Hatam Aqiqi Bakhshayishi was born in 1942 in the village of Bakhshayesh in the east of Tabriz to an Iranian Azerbaijani farmer family. He decided to leave his hometown to Tabriz for further education, and studied elementary and literary courses in Talebiyeh School. In 1958, he went to Qom to continue his studies in Hawza. There he studied with contemporary Ulema, especially Azeris, such as: Ahmad Payani, Yadullah Dozdozani and Ja'far Sobhani. Then he studied higher courses of philosophy, hikmat, Ja'fari jurisprudence and principles from Muhammad Husayn Tabatabai, Morteza Motahhari, Mohammad Bagher Soltani Tabatabai, Ruhollah Khomeini, Mohammad-Reza Golpaygani and Ali Masoumi Hamadani, he who obtained him an Ijazah.

At the same time as he studied in Qom, he also attended the courses at the Faculty of Theology and Islamic Studies of the University of Tehran, field of fiqh and the foundations of Islamic law. He also studied at Dar Tabligh Islami of Mohammad Kazem Shariatmadari in Qom. In 1971, he received a bachelor's degree from Tehran University, and an academic thesis from Dar Tabligh.

After graduating and becoming a Jafa'ri faqih, he turned to writing. From 1961 he started writing on religious topics in the Persian-language newspapers of that time, such as Neday-e Haq, Wazifeh and Noor Danesh magazine, and wrote his first book in the same year. In 1971, he was selected as a member of the editorial board of the first Iranian Islamic magazine in Qom, Maktab'e Eslam and published various articles. In journalism, he is famous for being the author of the first reporter of Khomeini's media presence in 1962. This report was prepared in 13 Rajab 1382 A.H. / 10 December 1962, about a meeting between Khomeini and the then prime minister, Ali Amini.

After the 1979 Iranian revolution, he taught in various colleges for about 12 years; including Islamic Azad University and University of Tehran. He was a member of the faculty of Tehran University and a teacher of Islamic education courses, and obtained a doctorate degree from Azerbaijan National Academy of Sciences in 1991. Aqiqi Bakhshiishi also participated in religious charity and civil fields of Shiite holy places in Iran, Azerbaijan and Syria. In 1994, he established a religious publication house in Qom called Navid-e Islam (or Navīd-i Islām). He was also active in dawah for the Twelver Shi'ism as a pro-Islamic Republican and believer to Wilayat-e Faqih, domestic and foreign.

Aqiqi died at the age of 68 on the morning of 5 April 2012 in Qom after enduring a period of more than a year of illness.

== Personal life ==
His daughter Azra Aghighi Bakhshayeshi (born 1968) is a calligraphic artist.

| فرزندان

- علیرضا عقیقی بخشایش
- حمیده عقیقی بخشایش
- عذرا عقیقی بخشایش
- حبیبه عقیقی بخشایش
- نوید عقیقی بخشایش
- امیررضا عقیقی بخشایش
- حمیدرضا عقیقی بخشایش

== Works ==
In addition to writing, he also translated from Arabic to Farsi many works, such as: Quran, Nahj al-Balagha, Sahifa al-Sajjadiyya, Al-Amali, Makarim al-Akhlaq by al-Tabarsi, Al-Bab al-hadi ashar by al-Hilli, Kanz al-ʻirfān fī fiqh al-Qurʼān by al-Fadil al-Miqdad, Rawz̤at al-shuhadāʼ by Husayn Kashifi etc. Bakhshayishi wrote more than 50 books on various topics of the Twelver Shi'ism, especially biography, among them:

- Persian: کتاب و کتابخانه‌ها، زیربنای تمدن و علوم اسلامی, romanized: Kitāb va kitābkhānahʹhā : zīrbanā-yi tamaddun va ʻulūm-i Islāmī, 1974
- Persian: پیکار در راه آزادی و آرمان انسانی, romanized: Paykār dar rāh-i āzādī va armān-i insānī, 1979
- Persian: زندگینامۀ پیشوایان, romanized: Zindagīnāmah-i pīshvāyan, series, 1979–1990
  - Persian: محمد رسول الله, romanized: Muḥammad rasūl Allāh, 1982
  - Persian: علی، حماسۀ جاودانه, romanized: ʻAlī, ḥamāsah-ʼi jāvidānah, 1982
  - Persian: امام جعفر صادق، پیشوا رئیس مذهب, romanized: Imām Jaʻfar-i Ṣādiq, pīshvā raʼīs-i maẕhab, 1981
- Persian: دورنمای زندگی موسی بن جعفر؛ اسطورۀ مبارزه و قهرمان مقاوت و پایداری, romanized: Dūrnamāʼī az zindagī-i Mūsá ibn Jaʻfar : usṭūrah-ʼi mubārizah va qahramān-i muqāvamat va pāyidārī, 1982
- Persian: آموزش‌های سیاسی و اجتماعی در احکام عبادتی اسلام, romanized: Āmūzishʹhā-yi siyāsī va ijtimāʻī dar aḥkām-i ʻibādatī-i Islām, 1980
- Persian: فقهای نامدار شیعه, romanized: Fuqahā-yi nāmdār-i Shīʻah, 1984
- Persian: یکصد سال مبارزه روحانیت اصیل و مترقی, romanized: Yakṣad sāl-i mubārizah-ʼi rūḥānīyat-i mutaraqqī, lit. 'Ten decades of ulama's struggle', 1985
- Persian: دیداری با مسلمانان جمهوری آذربایجان, romanized: Dīdārī bā Musalmānān-i Āẕarbāyjān-i Shūravī, 1991
- Persian: طبقات مفسران شیعه, romanized: Ṭabaqāt-i mufassirān-i Shīʻah, 1992
- Persian: شام سرزمین خاطره‌ها, romanized: Shām : sarzamīn-i khāṭirahʹhā va khaṭābahʹhā, 1992
- Persian: مفاخر آذربایجان, romanized: Mafākhir-i Āẕarbāyjān, lit. 'Honours of Azarbayjan', 1995–1996
- Persian: سیمای بخشایش, romanized: Sīmā-yi Bakhshāyish, 1998
- Persian: وصایای بزرگان ادب و عرفان, romanized: Vaṣāyā-yi buzurgān-i adab va ʻirfān, 1999
- Persian: شهر بخشایش و جلوه‌های ادبی آن, romanized: Shahr-i Bakhshāyish va jilvahʹhā-yi adabī-i ān, 1999
- Persian: سه مقتل گویا در حماسۀ عاشورا, romanized: Sih maqtal-i gūya dar ḥamāsah-i ʻĀshūrā, 2000
- Persian: چهارده نور پاک یا جوانان در محضر پیشوایان, romanized: 14 nūr-i pāk ya Javanān dar maḥz̤ar-i pīshvāyān (ʻA), 2002
- Persian: طبقات نسوان يا زنان نامی در فرهنگ و تمدن اسلامی, romanized: Ṭabaqāt-i nisvān ya Zanān-i nāmī dar tārīkh, farhang va tamaddun-i Islāmī, 2003
- Persian: فقیه وارسته: آیت‌اللّه العظمی سیدعلی سیستانی, romanized: Faqīh-i vārastah :Āyat Allāh al-ʻUẓmá Āqā-yi Ḥāj Sayyid ʻAlī Ḥusaynī Sīstānī, sīrah-ʼi ʻilmī va ʻamalī va ās̱ār va barakāt-i ū, 2003
- Persian: فرجام قاتلان امام حسین (ع) یا سرگذشت مختار ثقفى, romanized: Sarguẕasht-i Mukhtār S̱aqafī 'yā' farjām-i qātilān-i Imām Ḥusayn, 2010
- Persian: مقتل عباس‌ بن علی علیه السلام سردار بلند قامت دین, romanized: Maqtal-i ʻAbbās ibn ʻAlī, sardār-i buland qāmat-i dīn, 2010
- Persian: نظری به انجیل و تعلیمات مسیحیت,
- Persian: همسران رسول خدا,
- Persian: شعائر آیین ما,
- Persian: مشکلات اجتماعی عصر ما, romanized: Mushkilāt-i ijtimāʻī-i ʻaṣr-i mā,
- Persian: پیکار با فاجعه فقر و گرسنگی,
- Persian: ویرانگری‌های اعتیاد,
- Persian: سیری در اسرار و آثار نماز,
- Persian: مرجع وارسته: آیت‌اللّه العظمی فاضل لنکرانی,
- Persian: آیت‌الله طالقانی مرد مبارزه و شهادت,
- Persian: قمار این بلای بزرگ,
