= Bakhshayesh =

City in East Azerbaijan province, Iran

Bakhshayesh Persian: بخشايش
- City
- Location within Iran
- Coordinates: 38°07′53″N 46°56′46″E
- Country: Iran
- Province: East Azerbaijan
- County: Heris
- District: Central
- Established as a city: 1996

Population (2016)
  - Total: 6,102
- Time zone: UTC+3:30 (IRST)

Bakhshayesh (Persian: بخشايش) (Note: Also romanized as Bakhshaish, Bakhshāyesh, and Bekhshayesh) is a city in the Central District of Heris County, East Azerbaijan province, Iran. As a village, it was the capital of Mehranrud-e Shomali Rural District until the rural district's merger with Zarnaq Rural District in 2000 to form Baruq Rural District (Heris County). The village of Bakhshayesh was converted to a city in 1996.

== Demographics ==
=== Population ===
At the time of the 2006 National Census, the city's population was 5,752 in 1,386 households. The following census in 2011 counted 6,098 people in 1,677 households. The 2016 census measured the population of the city as 6,102 people in 1,801 households.

== Culture ==
The town gives its name to a type of handwoven carpets: Bakshaish rugs.

== Notable people ==
- Abd al-Rahim Aqiqi Bakhshayishi, (1942 – 5 April 2012) Islamic religious writer, journalist and translator.
