= Clotilde Reiss =

French student (born 1985)

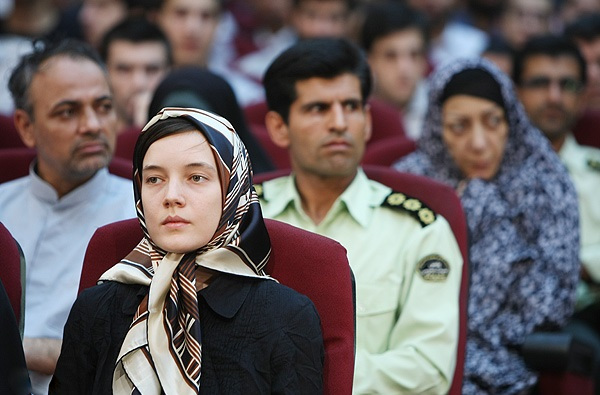
- Clotilde Reiss at her trial, 2009.
- Born: 31 July 1985 (age 41)
- Citizenship: France

Academic background
- Education: Science-Po Lille

Clotilde Reiss (born 31 July 1985) is a French student accused of being an agent of a French intelligence agency. Her arrest in Iran on espionage charges on 1 July 2009 generated considerable diplomatic controversy. She holds a master's degree from Sciences-Po Lille. At the time of her arrest, she was teaching in Isfahan and writing a master's thesis about teaching history and geography in Iranian schools. Clotilde Reiss was freed on 16 May 2010.

== Arrest, trial and incarceration ==
Reiss was arrested at Tehran Airport on 1 July 2009 on her way home to France via Beirut. Iranian authorities alleged that Reiss took photographs of the 2009 Iranian election protests in Isfahan and emailed them to a friend. This act constituted potential espionage against the Islamic Republic in the eyes of Iranian prosecutors. News of her arrest did not become public for several days, during which time the French government tried unsuccessfully to obtain her release.

When it became clear that Iran intended to put Reiss on trial, officials at the highest level of the French government publicly mobilized on her behalf; French Foreign Minister Bernard Kouchner called the charges against her "absurd" and President Nicolas Sarkozy dismissed them as "pure fantasy". She was visited by the ambassador of France in Tehran, Bernard Poletti, on 9 July 2009.

Her trial began in Tehran on 8 August 2009, at the same time as Nazak Afshar, a French-Iranian employee of the French Embassy and Hossein Rassam, an Iranian employee of the British embassy. The Swedish Presidency of the European Union expressed concern over the trial. It demanded that the prisoners be released promptly, saying, "The Presidency reiterates that actions against one EU country—citizen or embassy staff—is considered an action against all of EU, and will be treated accordingly." She was released on bail and resided at the French embassy, unable to leave the country pending the outcome of her trial.

== Liberation ==
President Mahmoud Ahmadinejad of Iran issued a statement signaling his government's willingness to release Reiss but clarifying that her release depended on the "approach and behavior adopted by French officials. He declined to elaborate further as to what he expected from the French government, saying only that "they know what to do." France has suggested that Iran is attempting to blackmail Paris into releasing an Iranian agent jailed in France for the 1991 murder of an exiled former prime minister in exchange for Reiss's freedom, a swap they have vigorously opposed.

Clotilde Reiss was freed on Sunday 16 May 2010 after active diplomatic talks between Brazilian president, Luiz Inácio Lula da Silva, and Iranian president Mahmoud Ahmadinejad. Another source says it was the efforts of Turkey’s foreign minister, Ahmet Davutoglu, who secured the release of Clotilde Reiss. She arrived in Paris on Sunday, the 16 May 2010, at around one o'clock and was received at the Élysée by the president Nicolas Sarkozy. She thanked her supporters and the president in a statement, "who proclaimed my innocence as soon as I was arrested."

Two days after her liberation, Ali Vakili Rad, one of Shapour Bakhtiar assassins, was released from jail in France. Both the French and Iranian governments deny the two affairs are linked.

Several days before her liberation, on 5 May 2010, a French court refused the extradition of Majid Kakavand, accused by the US of illegally procuring US and European high-tech components for Iran, to the US and set him free. The French government denies that the two affairs are linked confirms that at one point the Iranian government proposed a trade regarding Kakavand and Reiss, which the French government claims to have refused.

France denied that she was a spy in a statement published after her release. Pierre Siramy, a former deputy director of the French Directorate-General for External Security, claimed that she had worked as a contact for DGSE representative in Tehran and voluntarily provided information on Iran to France on the Iranian political climate, arms and nuclear proliferation. The government of France rejected that.

== See also ==
- List of foreign nationals detained in Iran
