= Aghajly =

Tabrizi carpets

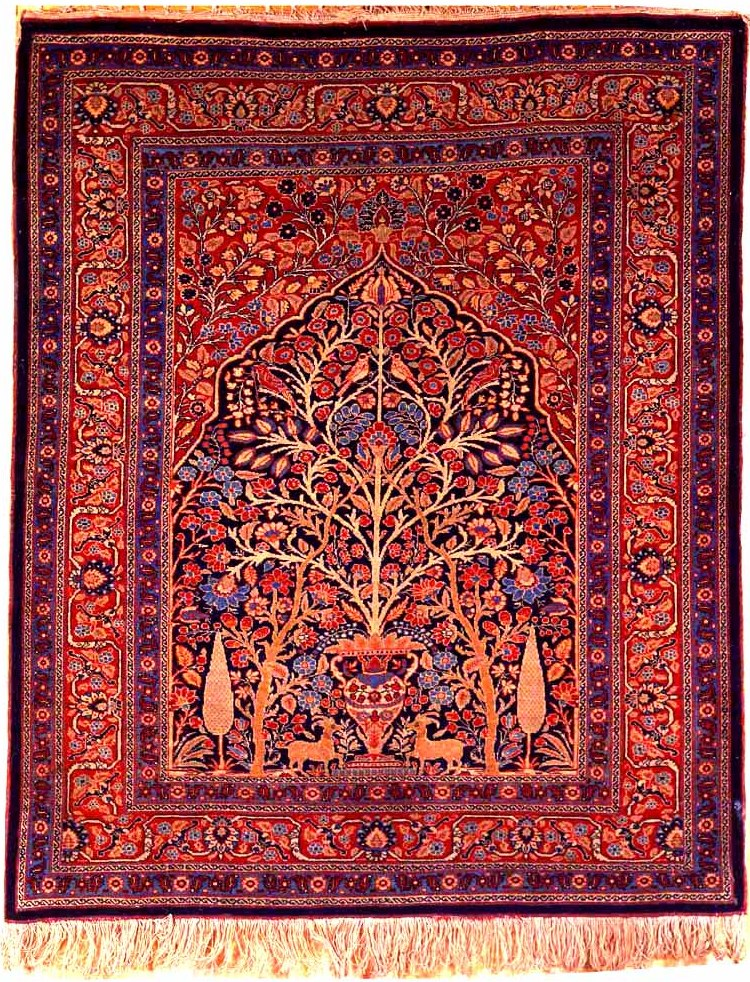
"Aghajly" carpet (19th century).

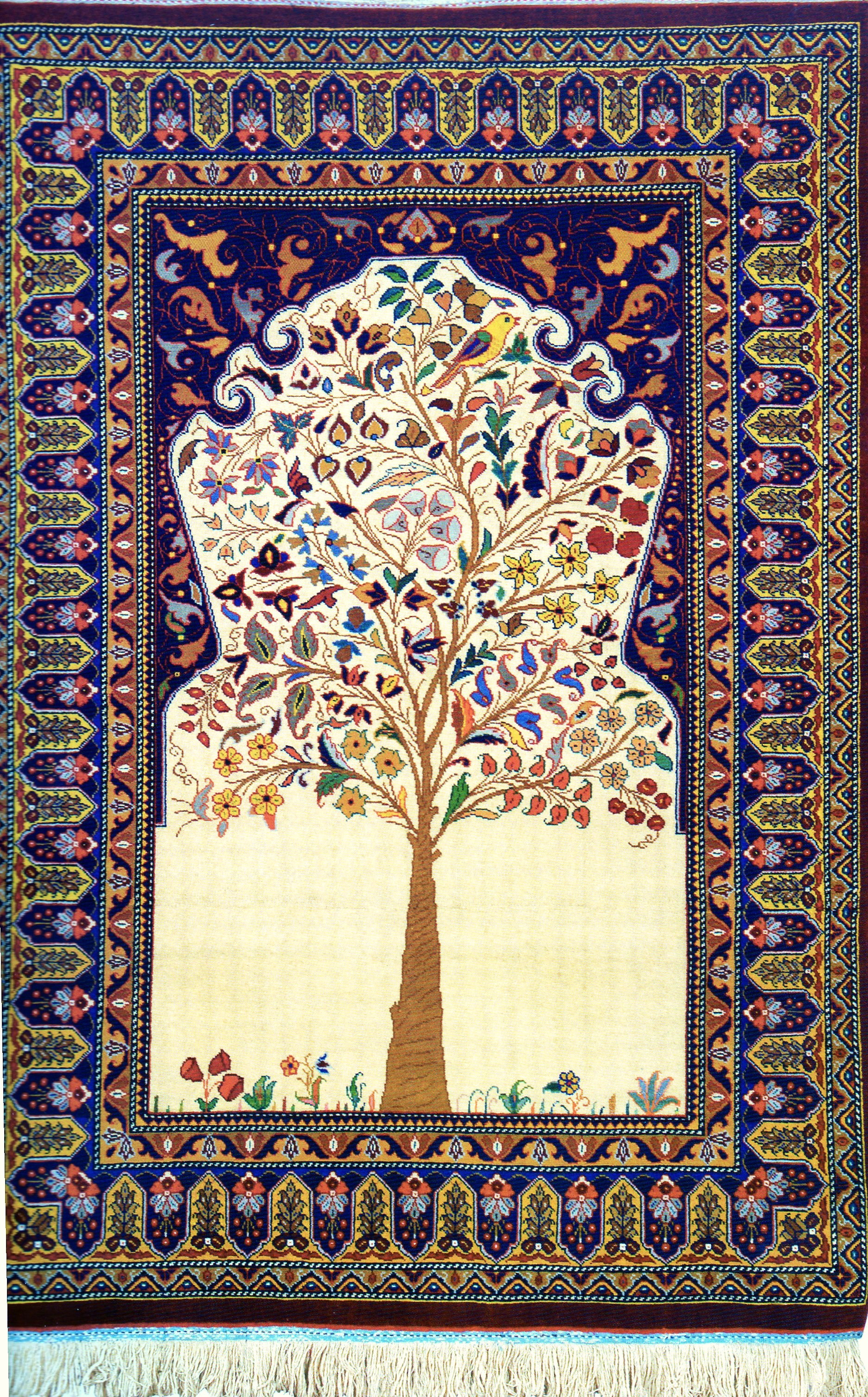
"Aghajly" carpet (L. Kerimov, 1974).

Aghajly are Persian carpets belonging to the Tabriz type. These carpets got their name not from the place of their production, but in accordance with their composition. Thus, the composition of the middle field of these carpets mainly consists of one or more trees and bushes and, in rare cases, of a group of trees intended to represent a garden or forest. The trees are represented differently. The spring or autumn trees are usually in bloom or with fruits (pomegranates, apples), and sometimes these are cypress, willow, weeping willow and other ornamental trees.

== Particularities ==
Previously, such features of the trees as twisted, branched trunk, etc. were considered a supernatural phenomenon and caused worship. The weeping willow ("majnun soyud"), for example, was a symbol of love, the oak was the personification of strength and courage, and the pomegranate tree symbolized the abundance of the good luck. And of course, the artisans, especially carpet weaving masters, used these symbolic images in their works. And the images of trees on carpets were stylized.

The composition of the Aghajly carpets, woven in the 15-16th centuries in Tabriz, is more complex, and the colours are more natural. The gardens and forests on these carpets are shown in a planar image, and the landscape itself has a foreground and a background. The artistic composition of the Aghajly carpets, woven in Azerbaijan, with its similar patterns and details, is very simple. Sometimes there are "Aghajly" carpets, in the upper part of the middle field of which there is a lyachak. The Aghajly carpets of a simpler composition are small in size. Their nodes are of low density. The carpets of a more complex composition are larger and denser. Sometimes, when creating the "Aghajly" composition, the folk artists even depict the tree roots.

== See also ==
- Azerbaijani rug
- Tabriz rug
