= Bakhshayish =

Type of Persian carpets

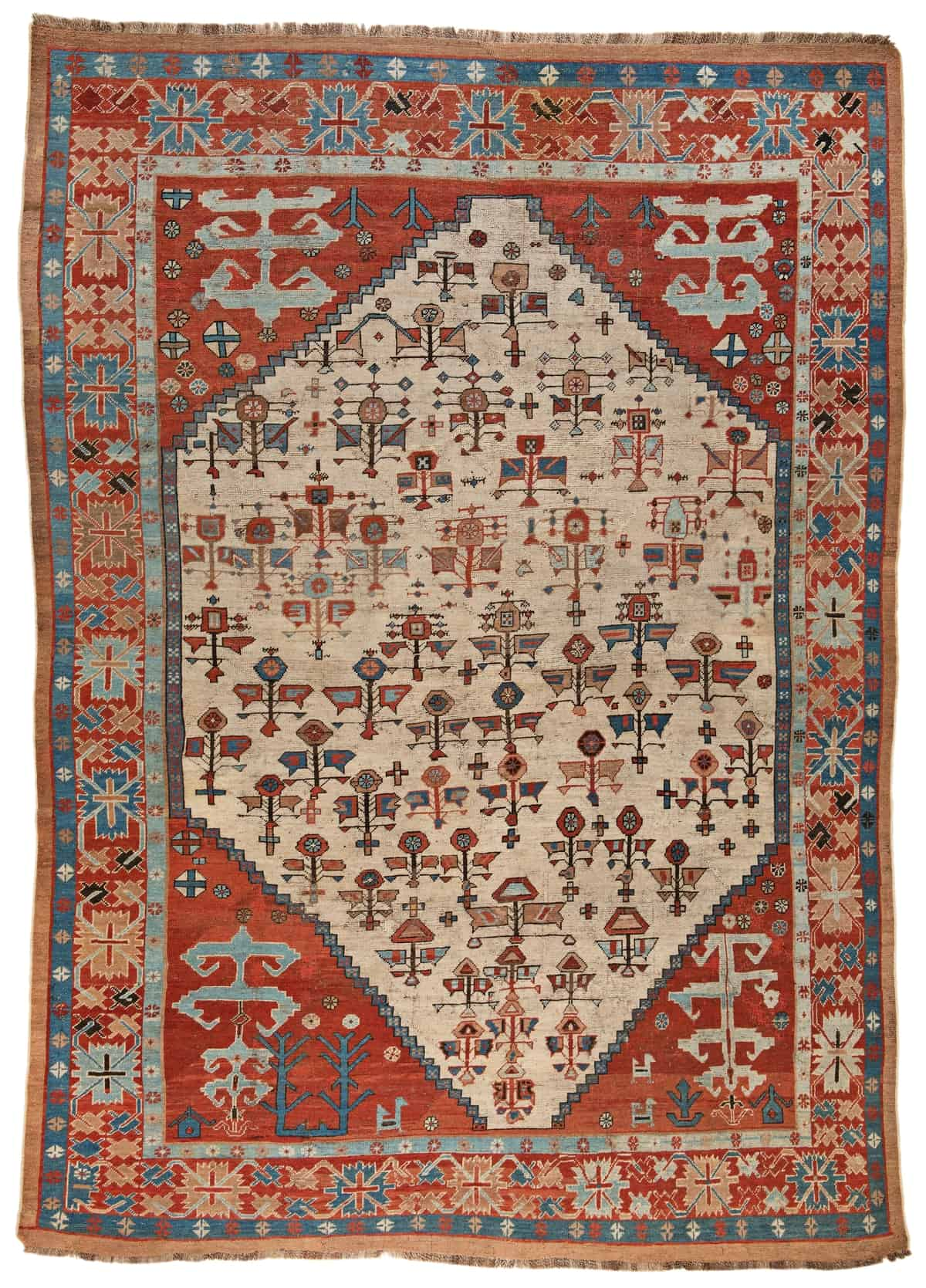
Mid 19th century Bakhshaish carpet, 329 x 235 cm

"Bakhshayish" (or Bakhshaish or Bakhshayesh) rugs and carpets are a tapestry from the village of Bakshaish in north-west Iran. Bakshaish is situated in the mountainous region, 30 mi (48 km) east of the large city of Tabriz. Its rugs are notable for their abstract adaptations of old tribal and classical Persian motifs.

The term refers to Northwest Persian carpets belonging to the Tabriz type. They got their name from the city Bakhshayesh, located 70 kilometres northeast of Tabriz. Until the recent past, this village was the centre of the household items of carpet manufacture production, including chuval, blankets, chuval, dzhurab, as well as lint-free kilim and palas carpets.

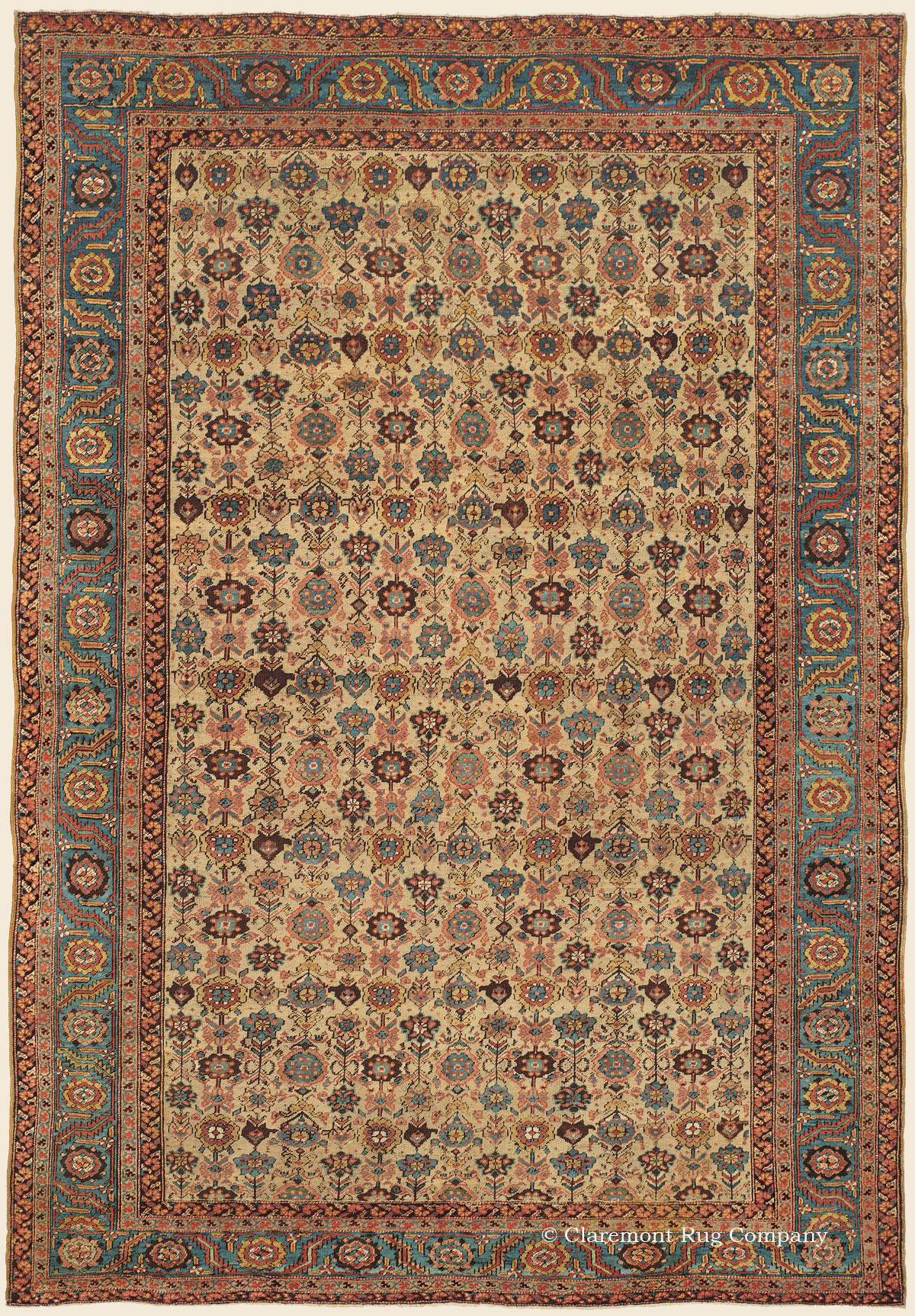
Northwest Persian Bakshaish camelhair rug, circa 1875, 10ft x 14ft

== Carpets and rugs ==
Bakshaish rugs adapt the style and sensibility of smaller tribal carpets from Northern Iran. The designs of Bakshaish rugs and carpets feature abstract geometric patterns and take their inspiration from Persian classical carpets, Often, following form of village pieces, Bakshaish carpets apply scattered graphics filling the woven field. Alternatively, they use empty space to allow graphics to stand out.

Most commonly Bakshaish rugs utilize curvilinear medallion designs, transforming classical cartoons into more abstract drawings, similar to Caucasian tribal rugs. In the late 19th century the designs produced in Bakshaish carpets were akin to those of the Arak weavers.

== Description ==
The middle field of Bakhshayish carpets usually has a smooth background. In the past, the background was woven from camel hair. However, starting from the second half of the 19th century, the background takes on a different colour - blue or burgundy. The total field of the carpet and the gol (göl) located in the centre of the middle field are strictly proportional. The arts critic Latif Karimov notes that this gives the composition balance and compactness. The middle field corners and the middle border, forming the centre of the border strip, are adorn by narrow diagonal stripes. On the Absheron Peninsula, these stripes are called "Sharlama" or "Shalnuma".

In artistic terms, the "Bakhshayish" carpet is similar to the "Khilya" and "Surakhani" carpets, which are part of the Baku group. Latif Karimov supposed that the general composition of the Bakhshayish carpet was borrowed from the woollen fabrics of India.

== Technical particularities ==
The Bakhshayish carpets differ in format and sizes. The most popular carpets are "besh cherek-eddi cherek" (125x200 cm). The density of the knots is the same as that of the Karabakh carpets.

== See also ==
- Tabriz rug
- Bakshaish
