= Zarnaq =

City in East Azerbaijan province, Iran

Zarnaq Persian: زرنق
- City
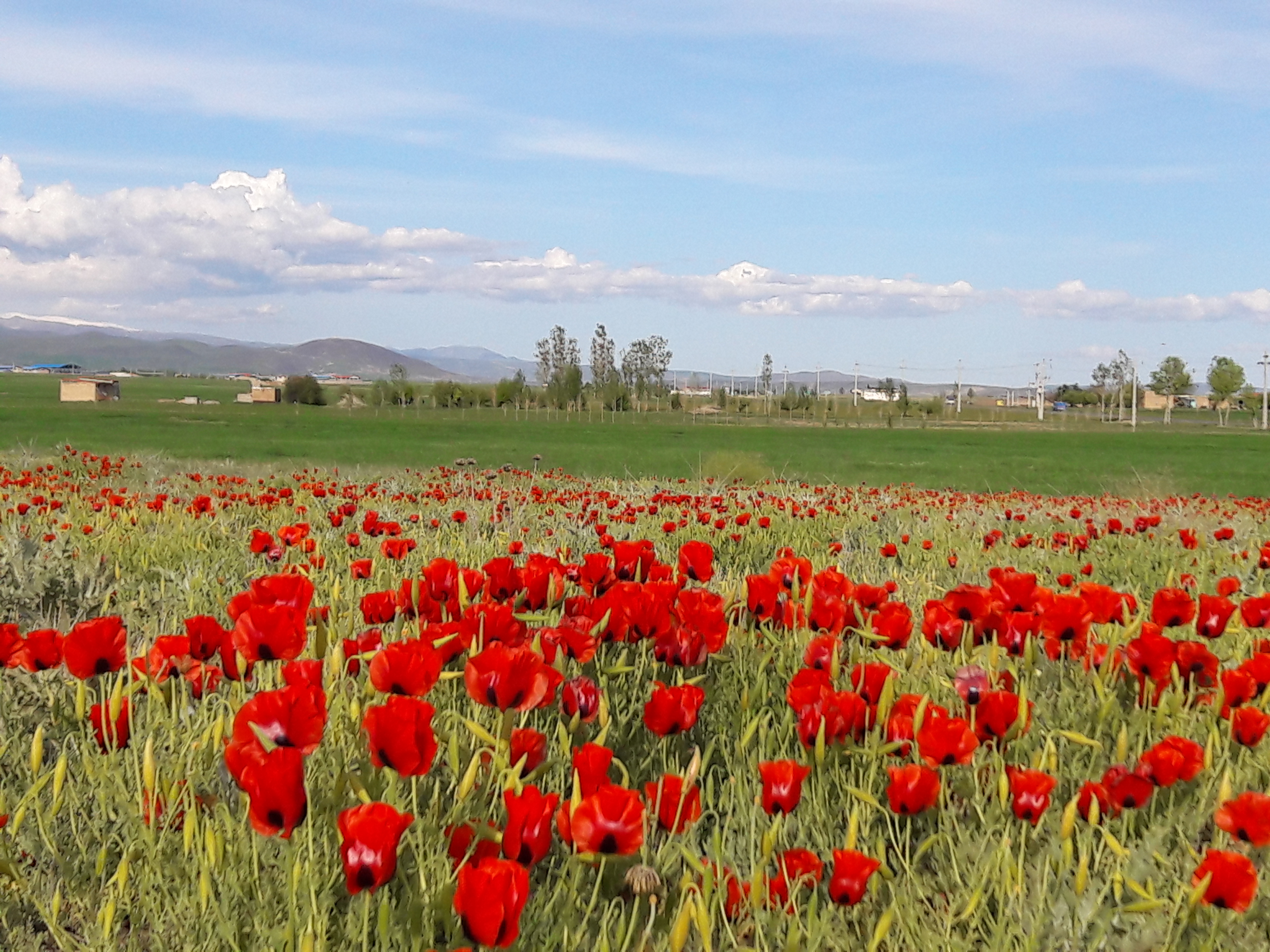

- Location within Iran
- Coordinates: 38°05′27″N 47°04′59″E
- Country: Iran
- Province: East Azerbaijan
- County: Heris
- District: Central
- Established as a city: 1994

Government
  - Mayor: Habib Abdollahi

Population (2026)(est.)
  - Total: 8,273
- Time zone: UTC+3:30 (IRST)
- Website: zarnaq.ir

Zarnaq (Persian: زرنق) (Note: Also known as Zaraq, Zarnā, and Zerna) is a city in the Central District of Heris County, East Azerbaijan province, Iran. As of 2026, the city has an estimated population of 8,273. As a village, it was the capital of Zarnaq Rural District until the rural district's merger with Mehranrud-e Shomali Rural District in 2000 to form Baruq Rural District (Heris County).. The village of Zarnaq was converted to a city in 1994.

== History ==
Sixty-five-hundred-year-old settlements and ancient objects have been discovered in the ancient hill of Duzde Baghir Zaranq.

This city was ruined before the migration of Turks to Azerbaijan, and around the 12th century, a population of Kipchak Turks settled in its outskirts, who are considered the ancestors of the current residents of this city.

According to the oral tradition of the people, the ancestor of the old clans of the city was a Kipchak nobleman named Qarabey who moved there from Cumania. His name is still on a grassland near the city. This city consists of several clans of the Shahsevans who settled there during the Safavid era and the Kipchak Turks (Qarabey's descendants) who lived there much earlier. This is why each clan has its own accent and some words are pronounced differently among each clan, which shows the difference between the Oghuz and Kipchak Turkic. These clans did not have close relationships such as marriage with each other until the late half of the 20th century, but over time, these boundaries disappeared and now younger people may not even know the name of the clan they belong to.

This city has long been one of the Heriz rug producers and many of its people were and still are carpet weavers or carpet traders. The tradition of Ashik music is also popular among them.

== Demographics ==
=== Language and ethnicity ===
The city's inhabitants are from Kipchak and Oghuz Turks and speak Azerbaijani Turkic.

=== Population ===
At the time of the 2006 National Census, the city's population was 4,766 in 1,132 households. The following census in 2011 counted 5,713 people in 1,548 households. The 2016 census measured the population of the city as 5,343 people in 1,649 households.

== Notable residents ==
Mohammad Feyz Sarabi, former cleric and politician

Mirza Ahmed Bey, known by his pen name Nourani, 19th century nobleman, poet, physician, mystic and an ancestor of the Nourani family.

Seyyid Qasim, a holy spiritual figure in the region, descendant of the Prophet of Islam, and mystic (not originally from Zarnaq, but he had long stays there). Also a friend of Mirza Ahmed Bey.
