= Kolvanaq =

City in East Azerbaijan province, Iran

Kolvanaq Persian: كلوانق
- City
- Location within Iran
- Coordinates: 38°06′07″N 46°59′24″E
- Country: Iran
- Province: East Azerbaijan
- County: Heris
- District: Central
- Established as a city: 1998

Population (2016)
  - Total: 7,465
- Time zone: UTC+3:30 (IRST)

Kolvanaq (Persian: كلوانق) (Note: Also romanized as Kolvānaq; also known as Kalvānā, Kilvana, Kolvānā, and Kolvānag,) is a city in the Central District of Heris County, East Azerbaijan province, Iran. The village of Kolvanaq was converted to a city in 1998.

== Demographics ==
=== Population ===
At the time of the 2006 National Census, the city's population was 6,344 in 1,456 households. The following census in 2011 counted 6,792 people in 1,827 households. The 2016 census measured the population of the city as 7,465 people in 2,111 households.
