= Hi-Q =

Hi-Q may refer to:

- Hi-Q (band), a Romanian pop group
- Hi-Q (game), a peg solitaire game
- Hi-Q (production music), a library of production music
- Delco Hi-Q, an American academic quiz competition

== See also ==
- Hiq (disambiguation)
