= Baruq Rural District =

Baruq Rural District (Persian: دهستان باروق) may refer to:

- Baruq Rural District (Heris County), East Azerbaijan province
- Baruq Rural District (West Azerbaijan Province)
