= Baruq, East Azerbaijan =

Village in East Azerbaijan province, Iran

Baruq Persian: باروق
- Village
- Location within Iran
- Coordinates: 38°10′23″N 47°03′53″E
- Country: Iran
- Province: East Azerbaijan
- County: Heris
- District: Central
- Rural District: Baruq

Population (2016)
  - Total: 913
- Time zone: UTC+3:30 (IRST)

Baruq (Persian: باروق) (Note: Also romanized as Bārūq) is a village in, and the capital of, Baruq Rural District (Note: Merger of Mehranrud-e Shomali and Zarnaq Rural Districts in 2000) in the Central District of Heris County, East Azerbaijan province, Iran.

== Demographics ==
=== Population ===
At the time of the 2006 National Census, the village's population was 1,070 in 273 households. The following census in 2011 counted 998 people in 302 households. The 2016 census measured the population of the village as 913 people in 293 households. It was the most populous village in its rural district.
