= Andis, East Azerbaijan =

Village in East Azerbaijan province, Iran

Andis Persian: انديس
- Village
- Location within Iran
- Coordinates: 38°13′11″N 47°12′20″E
- Country: Iran
- Province: East Azerbaijan
- County: Heris
- District: Central
- Rural District: Khanamrud

Population (2016)
  - Total: 372
- Time zone: UTC+3:30 (IRST)

Andis (Persian: انديس) (Note: Also romanized as Andīs) is a village in, and the capital of, Khanamrud Rural District in the Central District of Heris County, East Azerbaijan province, Iran.

== Demographics ==
=== Population ===
At the time of the 2006 National Census, the village's population was 401, in 85 households. The following census in 2011 counted 397 people in 90 households. The 2016 census measured the population of the village as 372 people in 108 households.
