= Paran =

Paran (also Pharan or Faran) may refer to:

== Places ==
- Paran, Egypt, an ancient site at the oasis of the Sinai's Wadi Feiran
- Desert of Paran, a location mentioned in the Hebrew Bible
- Paran, East Azerbaijan, a village in Iran
- Paran, Isfahan, a city in Iran
- Paran, Mazandaran, a village in Iran
- Paran, Israel, a moshav in Israel

== Other ==
- Paran (band), a former South Korean boyband
- Paran Brigade, an Israeli regular infantry regional brigade
- Paran (film), a 2025 Nepalese film

== See also ==
- Pran (disambiguation)
