= Borchaly (carpet) =

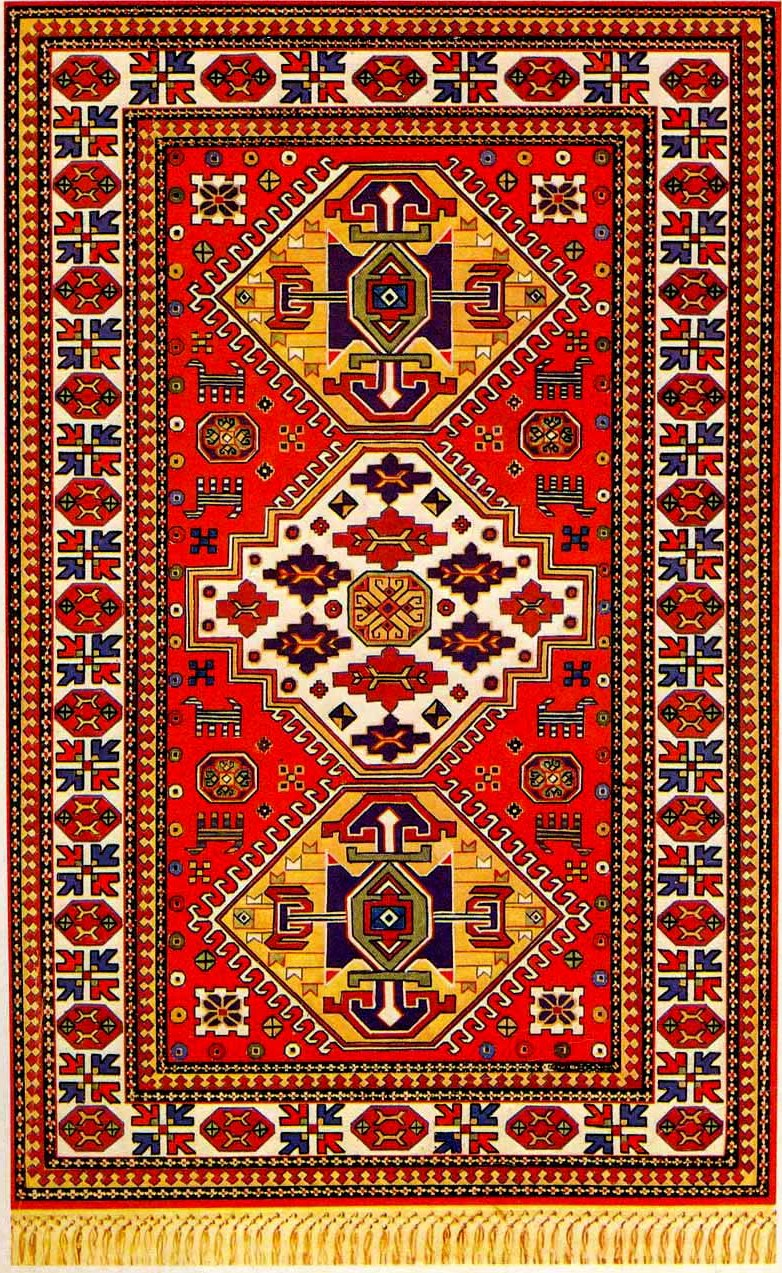
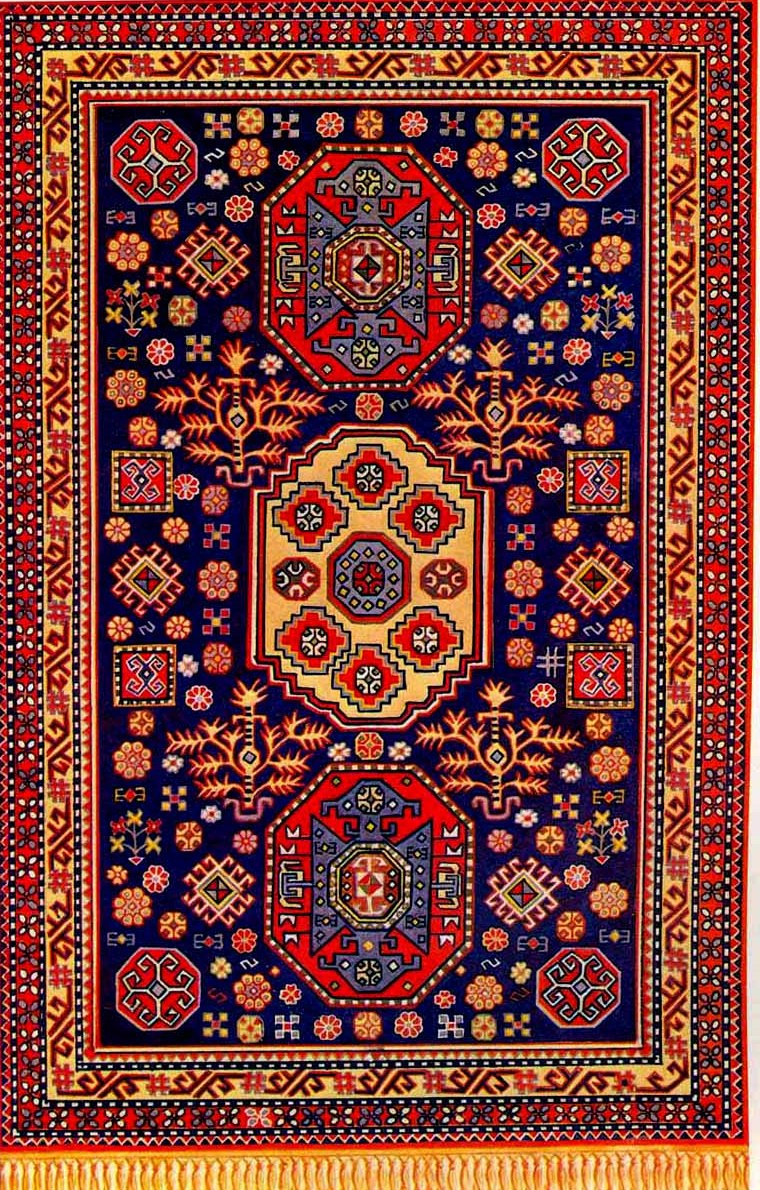
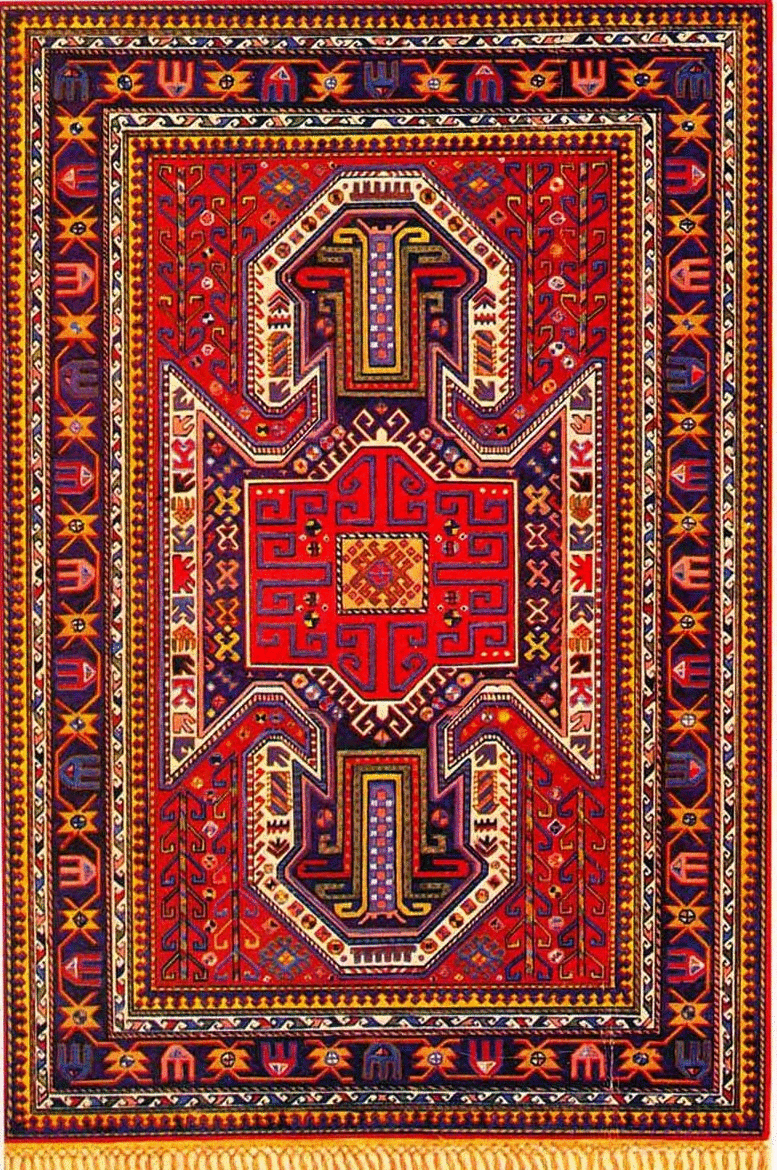

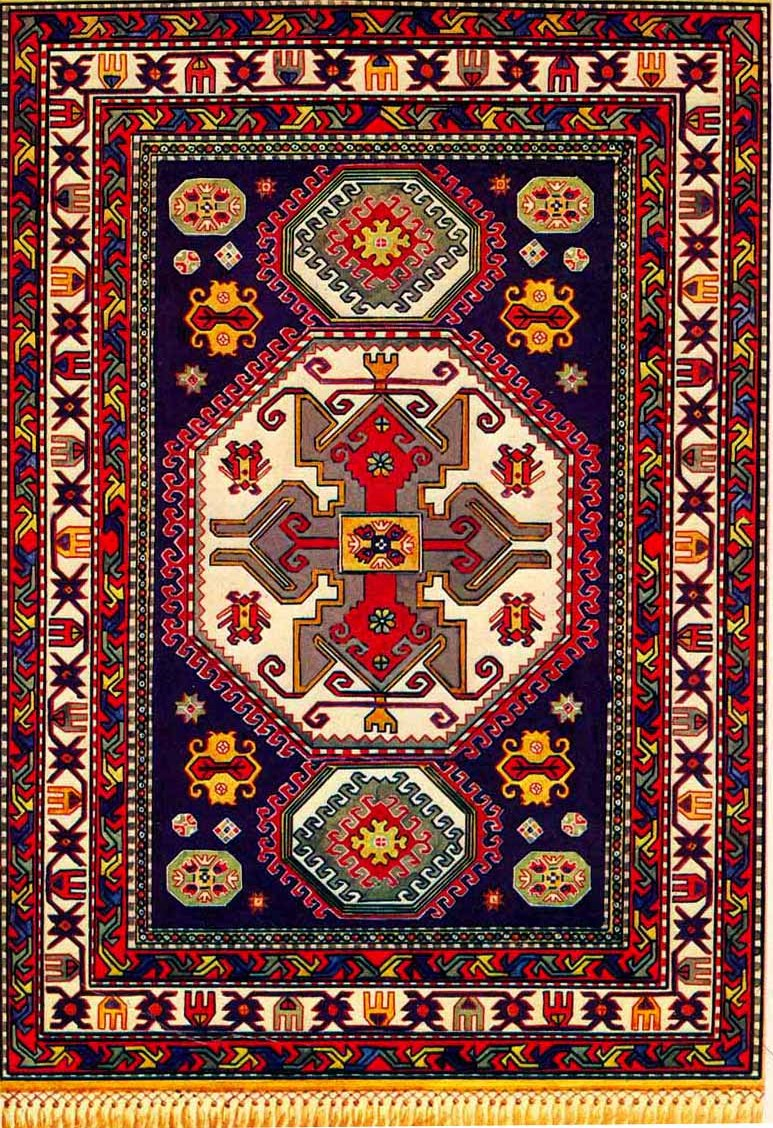
"Borchaly" carpets (19th century). Azerbaijan Carpet Museum, Baku

Borchaly (Azerbaijani: Borçalı) describes a sub-category within the Gazakh group of Azerbaijani carpets, even though the region from which they originate is now within Georgia. The name of this carpet is associated with the name of the Borchaly region, located to in southeastern Georgia close to the border of Gazakh district, Azerbaijan. Large villages of this region including Gurdlar, Akhurly, Kachagan, Sadakhly (Sashikhly), Dashtepe and Lembeli were once famous for carpet weaving, though in recent decades the art of carpet weaving has almost entirely died out, leaving only two known villages where Borchaly style carpets are still woven: Kosalar and Mughanlo (formerly Iormughanlo). The population of Borchaly (now known as Marneuli) including the above-mentioned villages consists mainly of ethnic Azerbaijanis.

== History ==
According to legend recounted by the art critic and carpet weaver Latif Kerimov, the current population of Borchaly, came from the large tribe Bozchalu, who lived in the region of the city of Sulduz in Iranian Azerbaijan. By the order of the Safavid dynasty's rulers, this tribe was resettled to the north of Gazakh, on the territory of Georgia in Borchaly. The cotton districts were given to their disposal. This tribe is also called Garapapag. The name of the carpet weaving centre Popagly, located three kilometers from Gazakh and the carpet weaving zones Garayazy and Garachep, situated in the north of Gazakh, is associated with the name of this tribe.

According to Kerimov, the ancestors of the Borchaly inhabitants borrowed the carpet weaving craft from the carpet school of such settlements of the Iranian Azerbaijan as Tabriz, Ardabil, Sarab, Garadag and especially those located around the lake Urmia, Erak, Bijar, Esna (Senne), Farakhan. Falling under the influence of the Gazakh carpet school and inspired by its traditions, they continued their development. Under the influence of these two carpet weaving schools, a subgroup of the Borchaly carpet school appeared represented by the carpet weaving centres Garayazy, Garachep, Lembeli, and others.

== Artistic particularities ==
Depending on the artistic structure, the Borchaly carpets are of several types. In the ornamental motives of the Borchaly carpets, one can see traces of the image of totems or echoes of mythological beliefs. The motives, which were once religious and mystical, were passed down from generation to generation, according to the tradition they have survived to nowadays. But recently, these motives have lost their religious significance and turned into ordinary decorative elements.

=== First type ===
The first type of the Borchaly carpets include those that the local weavers call Chobankere. The characteristic elements of these carpets are two gols (göl) located vertically on the central axis symmetrically in the middle field, as well as the images of trees on the four sides of the central gols (göl). On some carpets of this type there are also images of birds, camel and the element "mekteb ojagi" - the school hearth.

=== Second type ===
The second type is formed by the carpets, which in the Gazakh region got the name of "Farakhli", and in Borchaly they are called "Gurbaghaogly" or "with a frog". These carpets were also widely produced in the village of Gyaurarkh, located 12 kilometres south-east of Marneuli. The composition of this carpets' type is different. In some, in the middle field, it can be found göl-like elements arranged in a row one after the other. In other carpets, the combination of these gol (göl) forms an elongated figure. Until recently, the production centres of carpets of the second type were the villages of Gyaurarkh, Gurbaghaogly, located 12 kilometers south-east of Marneuli, and in the Gazakh district - the Farakhli village.

In the 1930s, Latif Kerimov was a participant within the meeting of the oldest carpet weavers of Gazakh which lasted for two days. During this time, Kerimov managed to talk with several old carpet weavers and find out the origin of some of the patterns. They talked about the form and origin of the göl-like element located in the middle field of the mentioned carpet. One of the carpet weavers said that this element depicts a frog. "The frog," she said, "is a beautiful animal. In water it is a fish, on land it is a nightingale. The information obtained, according to Kerimov, suggests that the drawing of the göl-like element of the middle field goes back to the image of a frog, which was once the totem of a certain tribe. But over time, this element lost its religious and mystical meaning and turned into a decorative and ornamental motive.

=== Third type ===
The third type is made up of carpets known among the carpet weavers under the name of "Ziyinatnishan" or "Zeyvanishan". They are produced mainly in the village Gyzylja or Gyzylgajili, located in the northwest of Marneuli. This carpet is distinguished not by a curb strip or any separate element, but by a cruciform medallion located in the centre of the middle field. There is a misconception that this medallion is a cross. This medallion is considered the main feature of this carpet and in fact depicts a hero in a felt cloak and a large shaggy wool hat (papag) made of sheepskin.

=== Fourth type ===
This type includes carpets that have received the name "Lembeli" among the carpet weavers. Located in the centre of the middle field of the carpets, the gol (göl) patterns are larger in size than those of other carpets of the Gazakh group. The background of these gols (göl) is usually white. In the centre of the gol (göl), according to the oldest carpet weavers, there is a "chanakhly baga" - a turtle or, as in the second type, a very stylized image of "gurbagha" - a frog. Sometimes carpets of this type are with three identical gols (göl) in the middle field.

=== Fifth type ===
The carpets of this type, also called "Lembeli", although they bear similarities with the carpets of the first and fourth types, they differ from them in the size and colour of the gols (göl) of the middle field. But the main difference is that these gols (göl) alternate through one.

== Technical particularities ==
The Borchaly carpets come in various formats and sizes. The carpets woven in the Lembeli village are comparatively large in size. The density of knots: each square decimetre accommodates from 30x30 to 35x35 knots (on each square meter - from 80 000 to 120 000 knots). Pile height 8-12 mm.

== See also ==
- Azerbaijani rug
- Tabriz rug
