= Pizzo Zerna =

Mountain in Italy

Coordinates: 46°02′54″N 9°49′51″E

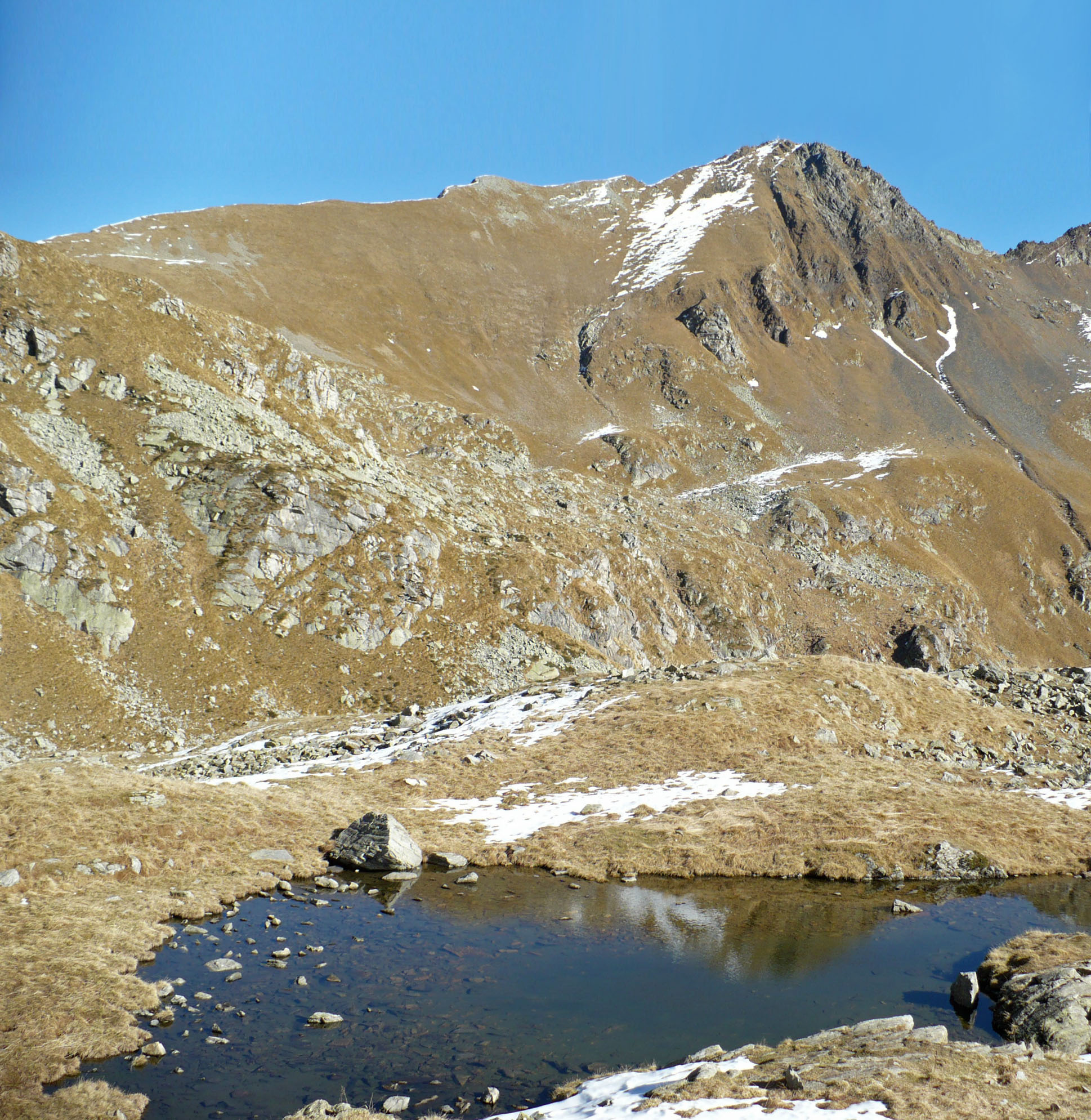
- Pizzo Zerna seen from Sambuzza valley.

Highest point
- Elevation: 2,572 m (8,438 ft)

Geography
- Location: Lombardy, Italy
- Parent range: Bergamo Alps

Pizzo Zerna is a mountain of Lombardy, Italy. It is located within the Bergamo Alps. Hiking is popular at the lower elevations, out of Carona.
