= Tabriz rug =

Fine Persian carpet with intricate designs, rich colors, and superb craftsmanship

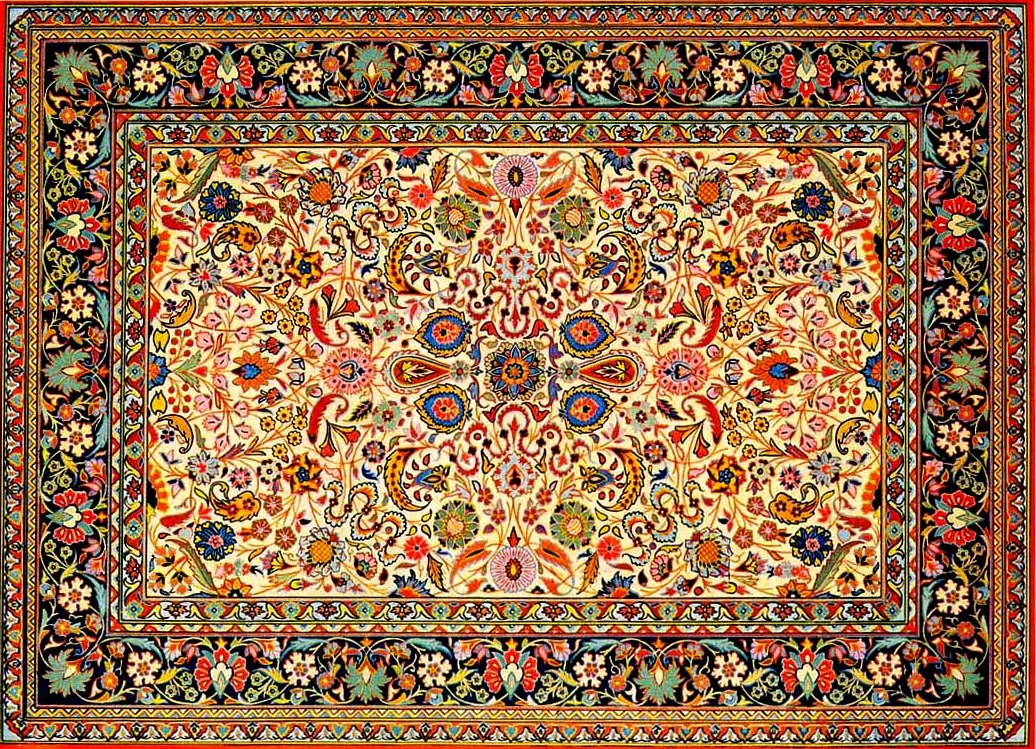
Typical traditional Tabriz style "Afshan carpet", Azerbaijan Carpet Museum

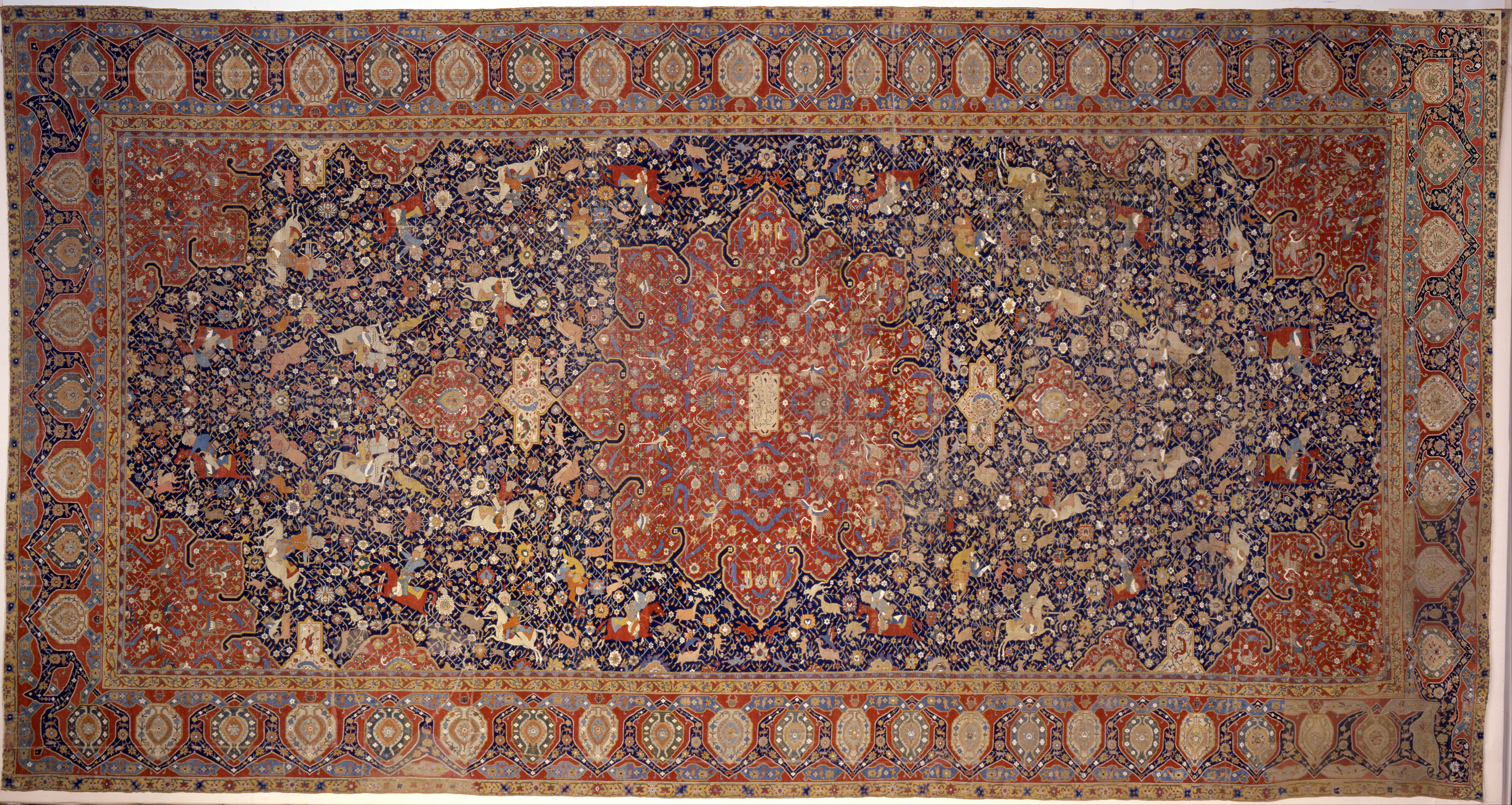
Tabriz style "Hunting carpet", Museo Poldi Pezzoli

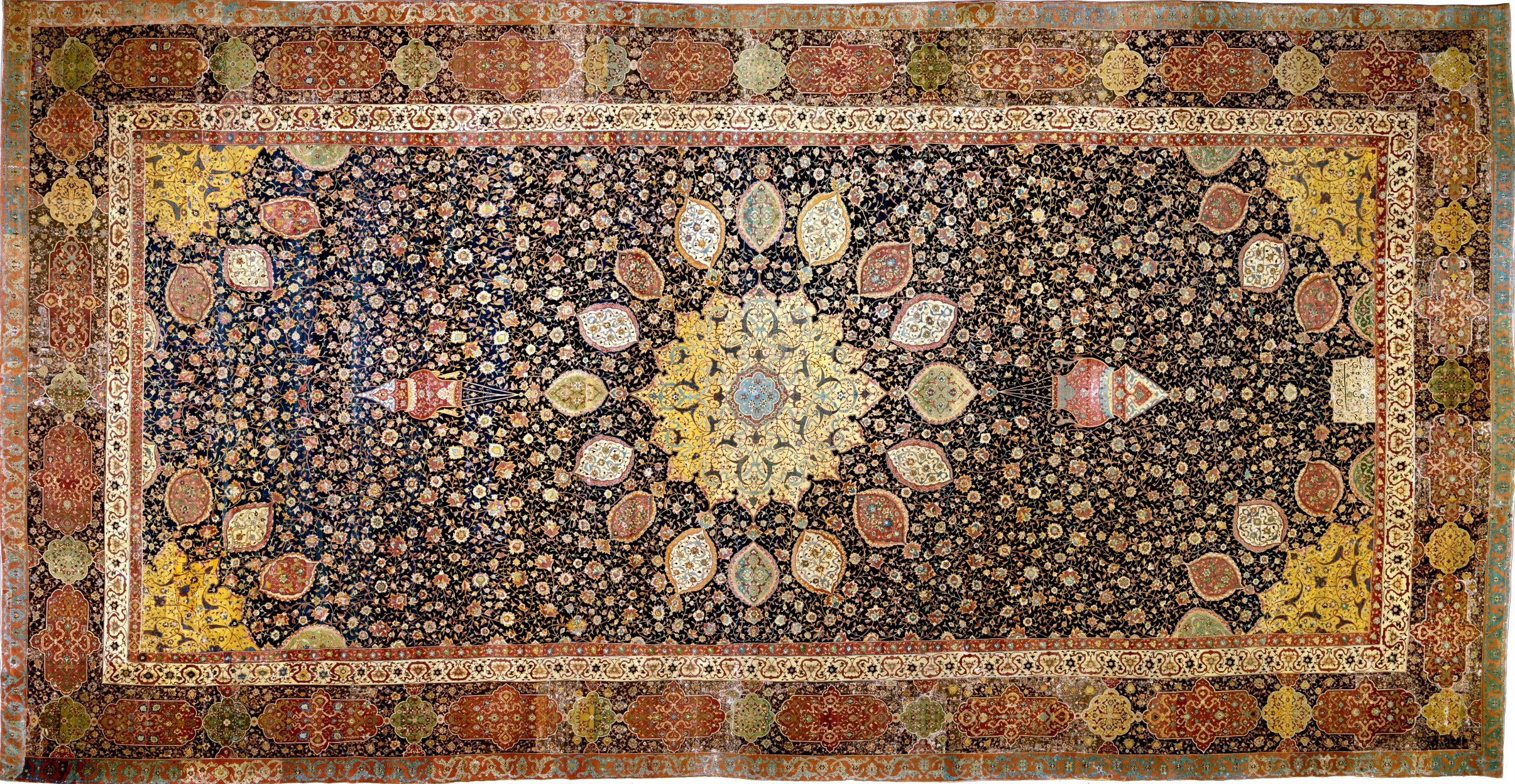
Tabriz style "Ardabil Carpet", Victoria and Albert Museum

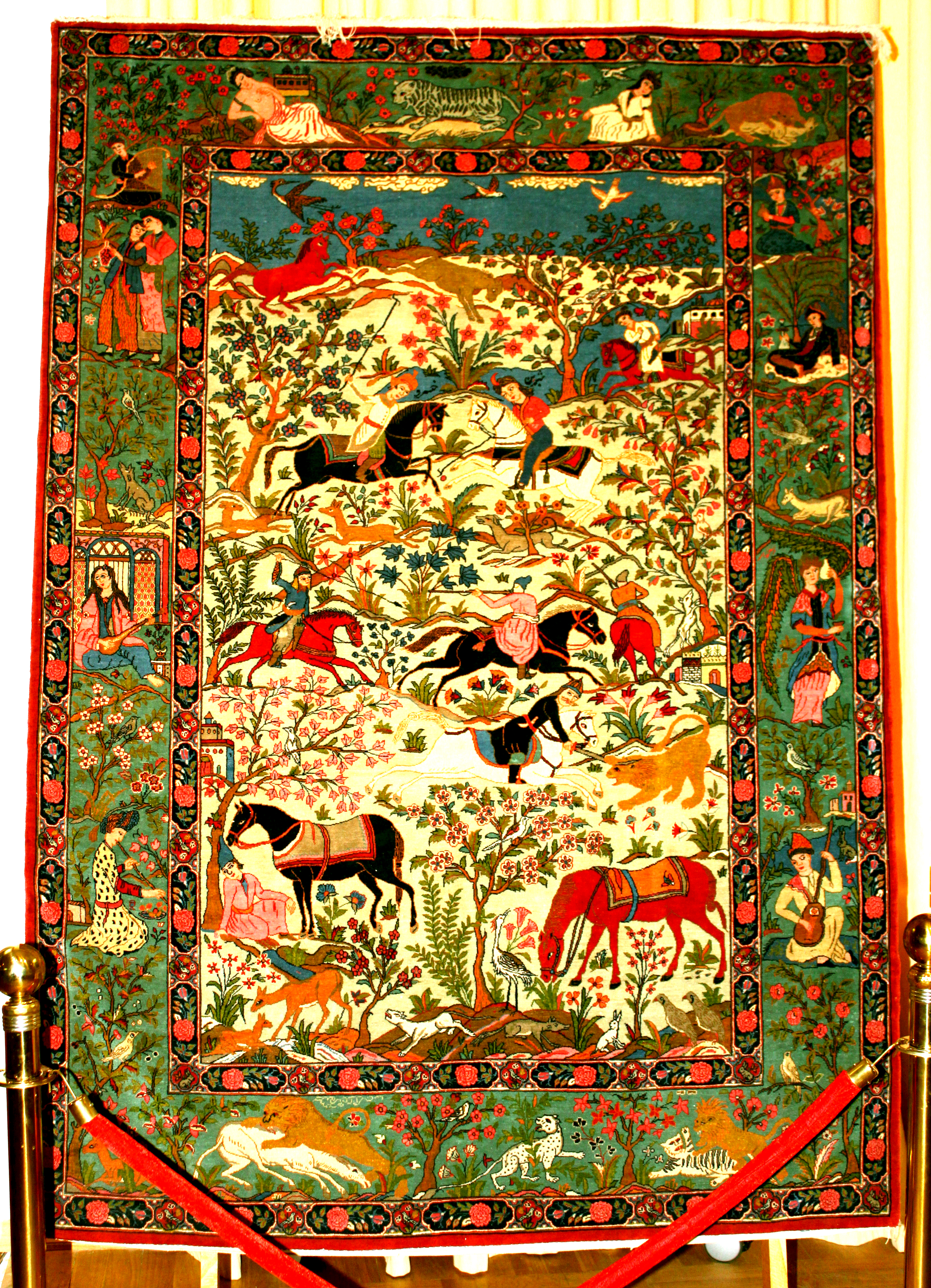
Tabriz style "Farhad and Shirin carpet", National Museum of History of Azerbaijan

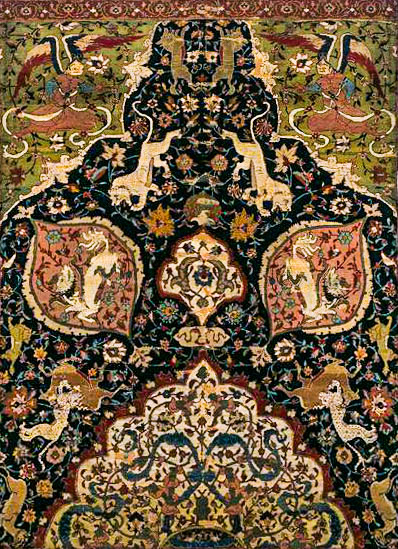
Tabriz style "Animal carpet", Victoria and Albert Museum

A Tabriz rug or carpet is a type in the general category of Persian carpets from the city of Tabriz, the capital city of East Azerbaijan province in northwest of Iran. It is one of the oldest rug weaving centers and makes a huge diversity of types of carpets. The range starts at Bazaar quality of 24 raj (Number of knots per 7 cm of the widths of the rug) and on up to the incredibly fine 110 raj. Raj is the unit of knot density. It shows the rigidity of the rug which based on the number of strings used for the foundation of the rug. Strings materials are usually made of cotton or silk which is used for very fine rugs.

Tabriz has one of the most diverse displays of designs from medallion, Herati/Mahi, to figural, pictorial, and even 3-d shaped rugs.

The major producers in Tabriz today include: Alabaf of Tabriz, Galibafi Nassadji Tabriz, and Miri Brothers.

Tabriz has been a large and worldwide famous carpet making center in Iran and the world. It played a significant role in development the rich traditions of the decorative and applied arts.

The art of Tabriz carpet was in its zenith in the 12th-16th centuries. About 200 Tabriz school masterpieces of the classical or "golden" period of the 14th century are characterized by a harmonic merge of the arts of miniature paintings and weaving, by a high level of craftsmanship demonstrated by artists and carpet weavers.

The Tabriz school can be divided into 2 subgroups: Tabriz and Ardabil.

== Ardabil carpets ==
" Ardabil", "Sheikh Safi", "Sarabi", "Shah Abbasi" and "Mir".

== Tabriz carpets ==
"Tabriz", "Heris", "Lachak-turanj", "Afshan", "Aghajly", "Dord Fasil", "Sardorud".

== Tabriz ==
Different types of carpets were made here, including pile and flat-weave, with simple and complex composition. The carpet making art was passed on from generation to generation and was considered the most valued heirloom. The traditional topics for the Tabriz carpets are the ornamental patterns, with the following dominant background colors: cream, red or navy blue. The most typical for this school are rugs and carpets grouped under the common name "Lachak turanj". In the middle of the center field and in the corners of the carpet ("lachak") (Persian: لچک triangle) there are "turanj" (Persian: ترنج Citron). The turanj in the center of the carpet is a symbol of the Moon, and the pattern formed by lozenges with the toothed leaves on the edges symbolizes the scales of the fish, which rise to the surface of the water at midnight to admire the Moon reflection. The origin of this composition dates back to the 9th-10th centuries. Often the topics for the Tabriz carpets are drawn from the works of the great Oriental poets. The carpets often depict the scenes of falconry or images of a ferocious lion. Well known are also Tabriz carpet-pictures with images of fragments of palaces and mosques, scenes of battles. Often, in creation of this or that ornamental pattern carpet weavers were inspired by the hand-painted covers of ancient books.

== Heris ==
The name of these carpets is associated with the village of Heris or Herez to the North East of Tabriz. The stylistic decoration of the "Heris" carpets is rather unusual. The composition and common shapes of the details are created on the basis of the composition "lachak turanj", which is formed by the foliate curve-linear patterns. However, with time the patterns of this composition became dotted and created an independent carpet pattern. Normally, the carpet was woven from memory, without a sketch. There is not surprising because since the beginning of the 16th century till the present day the craftsmen in Heris have traditionally been making only this type of carpet, and they know perfectly well its design and pattern. The residents of Heris are also renowned for production of flat-weave rugs – palases and kilims.

== Trees or Tree of Life ==
It is their composition that gave the name to these carpets rather than the place of production. In other parts of Iran, these carpets are widely known under the name of "Derakhti", in Afghanistan "Bagghi" and in Azerbaijan "Agajly". The composition of the center field the "Agajly" carpet consists largely of one or several trees and bushes, in rare cases – of a cluster of trees. The trees are of different appearance. In ancient times such compositions were based on some legendary events, love scenes, mythological and sometimes even religious and fanatical plots. The weeping willow was a symbol of love, the oak represented strength and courage, and the pomegranate personified abundance and luck. This type of design is used in Qum, Tabriz, Isfahan, Kashan

== Subject carpets ==
While the carpets with abstract patterns obviously prevail, there were subject carpets as well. The most ancient of them is mentioned by Nizami, the outstanding Iranian poet of the 12th century, whose work served as an inexhaustible source of inspiration not only for numerous miniature painters but for the carpet art as well. One of the most ancient subject carpets was the Sasanid carpet called "Zimistan" (Winter), which was taken by the Arabs as a trophy after the devastation of the Sasanid empire. Contrary to its name, this carpet is said to depict spring landscapes. It was called "Winter" because it was laid in the palace during wintertime and its vivid patterns brightened the winter interior with the luxuriant colors of the gardens and fields in bloom. Perhaps Khosrov Parviz, the Sasanid King, reminisced about spring when looking at this carpet in winter. Seasons constitute the most favorite carpet subjects. Normally, they form the background for the famous Oriental buildings, including forts, palaces, mosques, temples – the Nature blossoms and withers but the stones remain intact... Khosrau, Farhad, Shirin, Bahrām Gōr, Iskander, Layla and Majnun – these characters created by Ferdosi, Nizami and Fizuli, as well as scenes from their poems are often depicted in the carpets, whose style reminds you of the miniatures by the painters of the celebrated Tabriz school flourishing at the time of the Safavids. The subject carpets were based on various topics, the most favorite being those of hunting and animals, literature plots and religious themes.

Common Tabrizi rug design, garden print, vibrant colors on cream background.

Samples of Tabriz carpet:

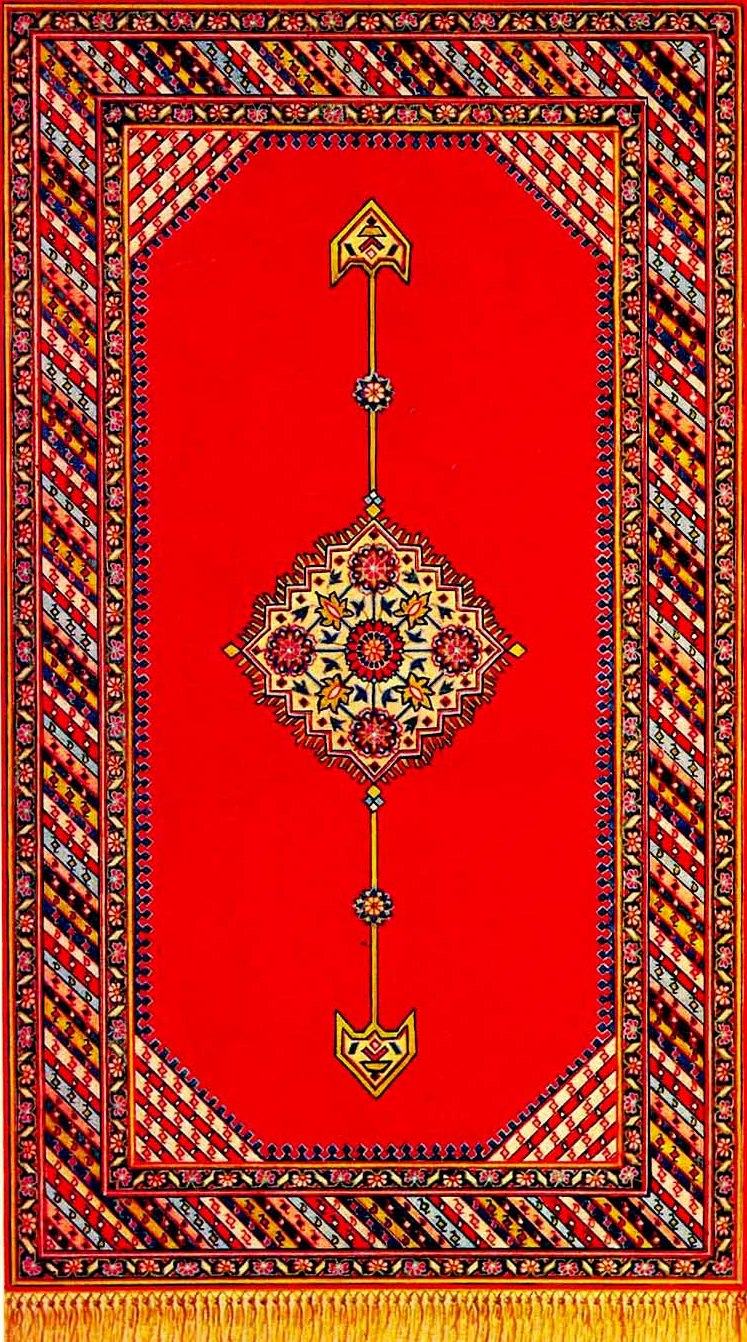
Bakhshayish carpet. 19th century.

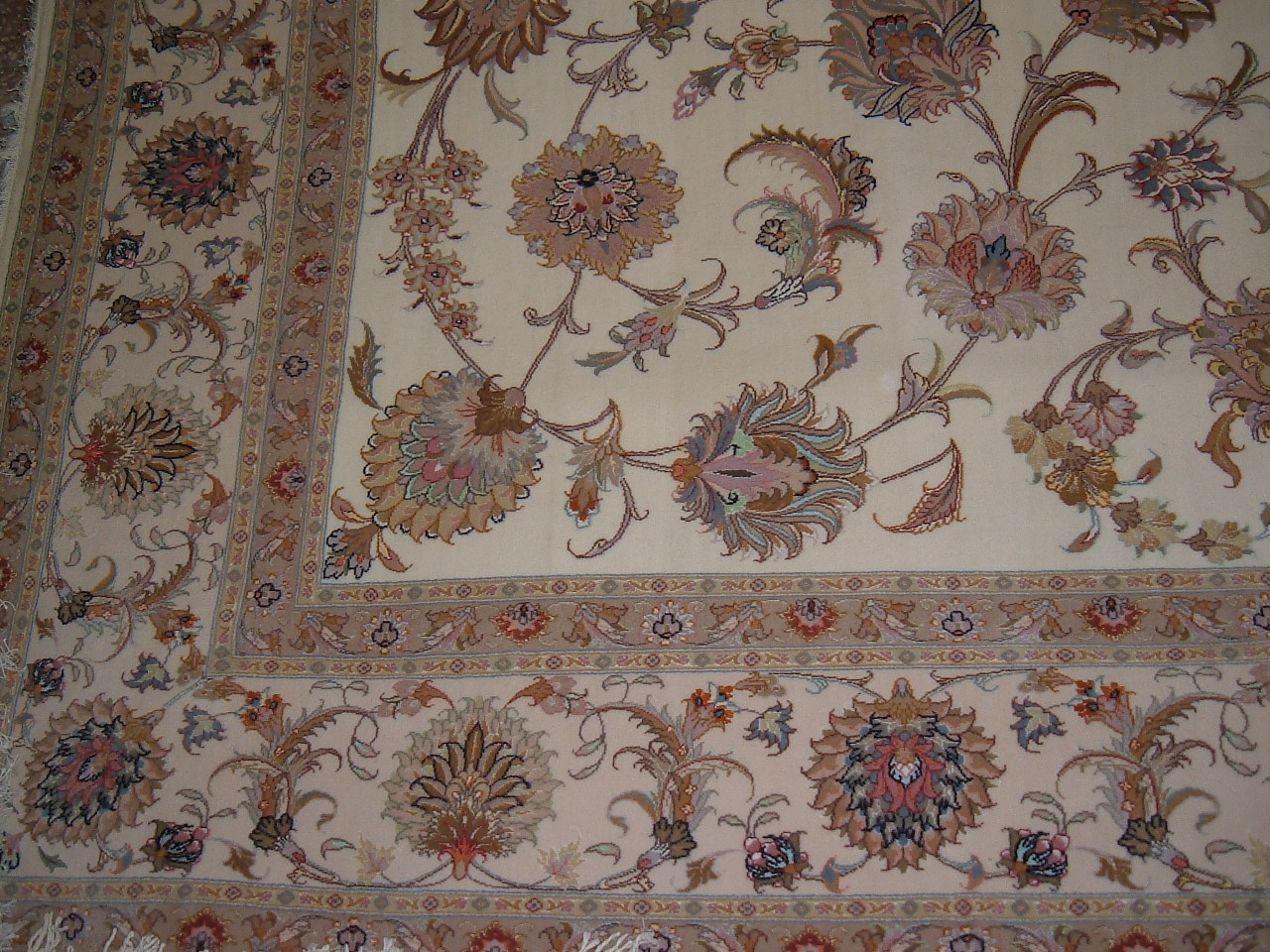
A sample of rugs woven near Tabriz

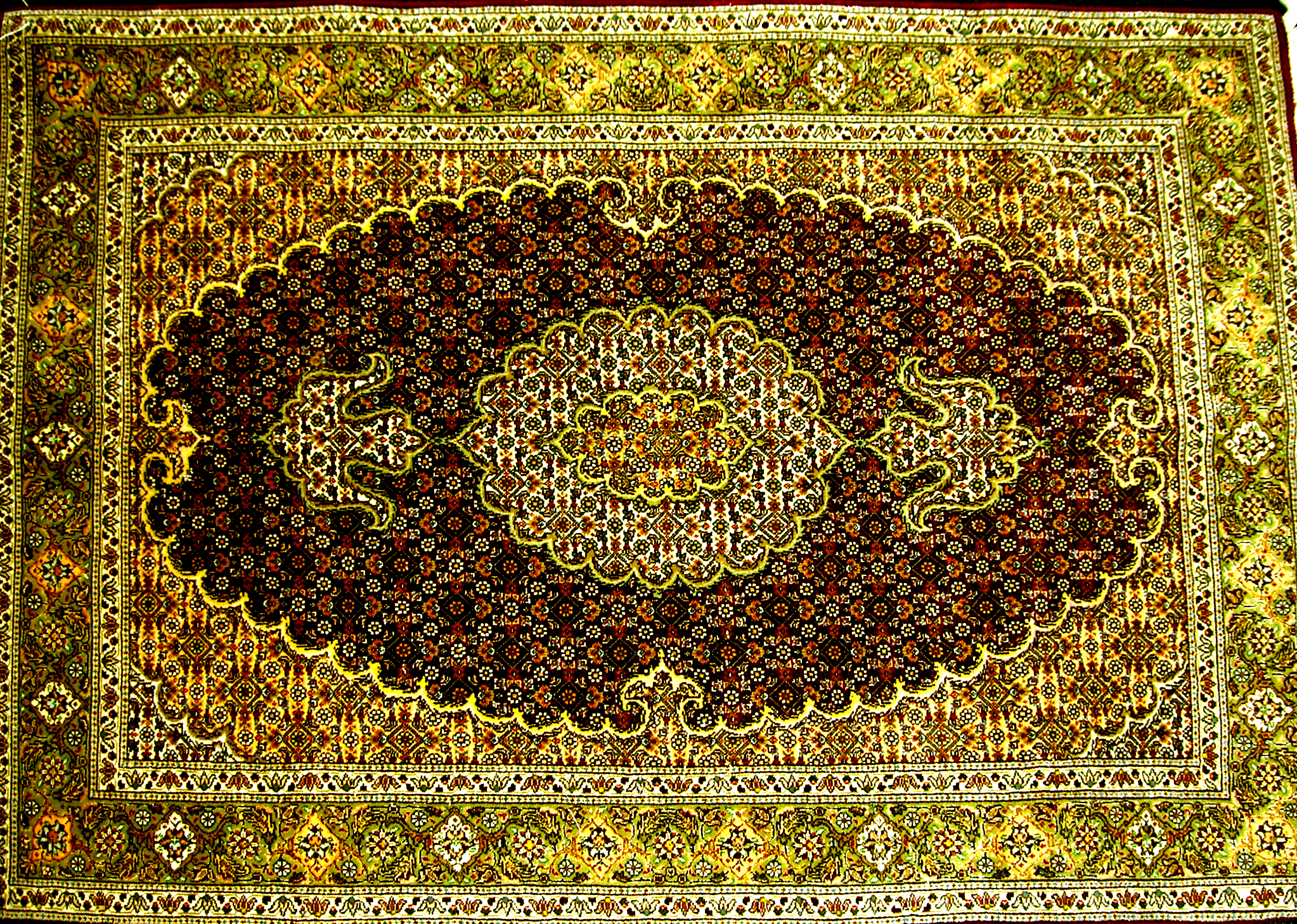
A Tabriz carpet with a fish design medallion

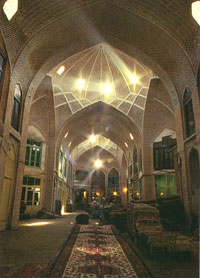
A carpet-selling alley in Tabriz Bazaar.
