= Afshan =

Afshan افشان
- Village
- Location within Iran
- Coordinates: 26°39′05″N 61°41′29″E
- Country: Iran
- Province: Sistan and Baluchestan
- County: Mehrestan
- Bakhsh: Ashar
- Rural District: Ashar

Population (2006)
  - Total: 1,078
- Time zone: UTC+3:30 (IRST)
  - Summer (DST): UTC+4:30 (IRDT)

Afshan (Persian: افشان, also Romanized as Afshān; also known as Afshār) is a village in Ashar Rural District, Ashar District, Mehrestan County, Sistan and Baluchestan Province, Iran. At the 2006 census, its population was 1,078, in 236 families.
