= Heris =

City in East Azerbaijan province, Iran

Heris Persian: هريس
- City
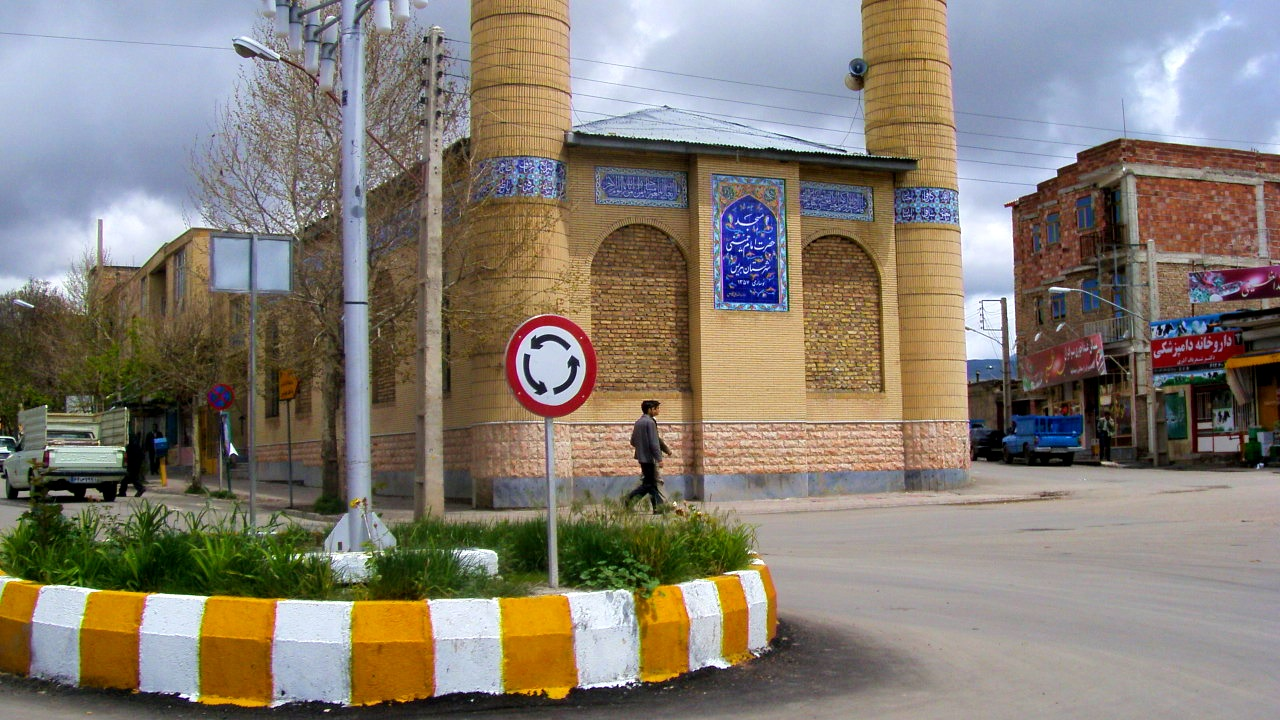

- Location within Iran
- Coordinates: 38°14′51″N 47°06′59″E
- Country: Iran
- Province: East Azerbaijan
- County: Heris
- District: Central

Population (2016)
  - Total: 10,515
- Time zone: UTC+3:30 (IRST)

Heris (Persian: هريس) (Note: Also romanized as Harīs and Herīs; also known as Hiriz) is a city in the Central District of Heris County, East Azerbaijan province, Iran, serving as capital of both the county and the district. Heris is the center of one of the weaving areas in the Iranian part of Azerbaijan, and gave its name to Heriz rugs.

== Demographics ==
=== Population ===
At the time of the 2006 National Census, the city's population was 9,513 in 2,359 households. The following census in 2011 counted 9,823 people in 2,704 households. The 2016 census measured the population of the city as 10,515 people in 3,114 households.
