= Pranburi =

Pranburi (Thai: ปราณบุรี) may refer to:

- Pran Buri District and town, Prachuap Khiri Khan Province, Thailand
- Pranburi River, which flows through the district
- Pranburi Forest Park, at the mouth of the Pranburi river

== See also ==
- Pranburia, a genus of corinnid sac spiders
