= Param, Iran =

Village in East Azerbaijan province, Iran

Param Persian: پارام
- Village
- Location within Iran
- Coordinates: 38°14′08″N 46°59′17″E
- Country: Iran
- Province: East Azerbaijan
- County: Heris
- District: Central
- Rural District: Bedevostan-e Sharqi

Population (2016)
  - Total: 870
- Time zone: UTC+3:30 (IRST)

Param (Persian: پارام) (Note: Also romanized as Pārām; also known as Paran and Yārām) is a village in Bedevostan-e Sharqi Rural District, of the Central District in Heris County, East Azerbaijan province, Iran.

== Demographics ==
At the time of the 2006 National Census, the village's population was 833 in 172 households. The following census in 2011 counted 885 people in 193 households. The 2016 census recorded a population of 870 in 248 households.
