= Nazak Afshar =

French-Iranian woman imprisoned in Iran

Nazak Afshar (Persian: نازَک افشار) is a French-Iranian woman currently imprisoned in Iran. Iranian authorities arrested Afshar in March 2016 upon her arrival in the country to visit her critically ill mother. Afshar, who formerly worked at the French embassy in Tehran, "had previously been arrested in 2009 on charges of spying and of acting against Iran's national security." Due to the intervention of the French government at that time, she was freed and left the country that year.

In April 2016, the Iranian judiciary reportedly sentenced her to six years in prison.

== Arrest in 2009 ==
She was arrested in the summer of 2009 after the controversial presidential election for participating in several demonstrations and working in the cultural section of the French Embassy, and on charges of sending emails to certain individuals about news and protest events after the June 12, 2009 elections, and "causing unrest and creating a network and sheltering rioters in the cultural section of the French Embassy." She was released after a while and went to France.

Ms. Afshar's release came 24 hours after the European Union warned Iranian authorities that the trial of Nazk Afshar and Hossein Rassam (photojournalist and other detainees from the 2009 protests) would be a united front against Tehran's actions.

However, it is said that her release was mediated by the Syrian government, and following her release, the office of then-President Nicolas Sarkozy issued a statement appreciating the cooperation of countries close to Iran, including Syria, in freeing the employee of the French embassy in Tehran.

== Receiving the Legion of Honor ==
Nazak Afshar received the Legion of Honor in Paris in 2011. The ceremony to award the medal to Nazak Afshar was held at her home and in the presence of the former French ambassador to Tehran on behalf of Nicolas Sarkozy. She said "Because I have been working within the framework of cooperation between the Iranian and French governments for 20 years, the French government and the president personally recognized that I am worthy of receiving this medal."

== See also ==
- List of foreign nationals detained in Iran
- Clotilde Reiss
