= Kamran Afshar Naderi =

Iranian architect

Kamran Afshar Naderi is an Iranian architect.

Kamran Afshar Naderi started his studies in architecture in 1977 at the University of Tehran. While studying in Italy, he obtained a PhD in architecture.

In 2019, he collaborated with ceramist Leila Farzaneh on an artwork entitled "The Tree of Life". His work has been featured on the Designboom and ArchDaily websites.
