= Hamid Ullah Afsar =

- حامد اللہ افسر میرٹھی
- Born: 29 November 1895; Meerut, British Raj
- Died: 19 April 1974 (aged 78); Lucknow, India
- Occupations: Writer and poet
- Writing career
- Pen name: Afsar
- Language: Urdu

Hamidullah Afsar Merathi was an Indian Urdu poet and writer. He was born in 1895 and died on 19 April 1974 at Lucknow. He wrote many poems and stories for children.

Merathi was born on November 29, 1895 in Merath. He received his early education in Merath. In addition to the conventional education in Arabic and Persian, he was also inclined towards reading and writing due to the academic, religious and literary environment of his home. In 1927, he was appointed as an Urdu teacher at Jubilee College, Lucknow. He retired from there in 1950. Hamidullah Afsar Merithi died in Lucknow on 19 April 1974.
