= Pran Nath =

Pran Nath may refer to:

- Pran Nath (musician) (1918–1996), Indian singer of the Kirana style
- Pran Nath (physicist) (born 1939), Indian particle physicist
- Pran Nath Lekhi (1924/1925–2010), Indian lawyer
- Pran Nath Thapar (1906–1975), Indian military commander
