= Avşar, Aghjabadi =

Avşar
- Municipality
- Location within Azerbaijan Location within Karabakh Economic Region
- Coordinates: 39°58′26″N 47°25′26″E
- Country: Azerbaijan
- Rayon: Aghjabadi

Population
  - Total: 5,600
- Time zone: UTC+4 (AZT)
  - Summer (DST): UTC+5 (AZT)

Avşar (also, Uzeirkend and Üzejirkənd) is a village and municipality in the Aghjabadi Rayon of Azerbaijan. It has a population of 5,600. Ehali 1.

== Notable natives ==
- Namig Abdullayev, a national hero of Azerbaijan.
