= Bedevostan-e Sharqi Rural District =

Rural district in East Azerbaijan province, Iran

Bedevostan-e Sharqi Rural District Persian: دهستان بدوستان شرقي
- Rural District
- Location within Iran
- Coordinates: 38°16′N 47°01′E
- Country: Iran
- Province: East Azerbaijan
- County: Heris
- District: Central
- Established: 1987
- Capital: Maqsudlu

Population (2016)
  - Total: 5,984
- Time zone: UTC+3:30 (IRST)

Bedevostan-e Sharqi Rural District (Persian: دهستان بدوستان شرقي) is in the Central District of Heris County, East Azerbaijan province, Iran. Its capital is the village of Maqsudlu.

== Demographics ==
=== Population ===
At the time of the 2006 National Census, the rural district's population was 5,729 in 1,311 households. There were 5,948 inhabitants in 1,551 households at the following census of 2011. The 2016 census measured the population of the rural district as 5,984 in 1,808 households. The most populous of its 13 villages was Namrur, with 1,424 people.

=== Other villages in the rural district ===
- Barazin
- Minaq
- Param
