= Baruq Rural District (Heris County) =

Rural district in East Azerbaijan province, Iran

Baruq Rural District Persian: دهستان باروق
- Rural District
- Location within Iran
- Coordinates: 38°08′N 46°58′E
- Country: Iran
- Province: East Azerbaijan
- County: Heris
- District: Central
- Established: 2000
- Capital: Baruq

Population (2016)
  - Total: 1,828
- Time zone: UTC+3:30 (IRST)

Baruq Rural District (Persian: دهستان باروق) is in the Central District of Heris County, East Azerbaijan province, Iran. Its capital is the village of Baruq. Baruq Rural District was created from the merger of Mehranrud-e Shomali and Zarnaq Rural Districts in 2000.

== Demographics ==
=== Population ===
At the time of the 2006 National Census, the rural district's population was 1,883 in 475 households. There were 1,863 inhabitants in 515 households at the following census of 2011. The 2016 census measured the population of the rural district as 1,828 in 609 households. The most populous of its four villages was Baruq, with 913 people.

=== Other villages in the rural district ===
- Karam Javan
- Qezeljeh-ye Kharabeh
- Tazeh Kand
