= Khanamrud Rural District =

Rural district in East Azerbaijan province, Iran

Khanamrud Rural District Persian: دهستان خانمرود
- Rural District
- Location within Iran
- Coordinates: 38°15′N 47°15′E
- Country: Iran
- Province: East Azerbaijan
- County: Heris
- District: Central
- Established: 1987
- Capital: Andis

Population (2016)
  - Total: 3,321
- Time zone: UTC+3:30 (IRST)

Khanamrud Rural District (Persian: دهستان خانمرود) is in the Central District of Heris County, East Azerbaijan province, Iran. Its capital is the village of Andis.

== Demographics ==
=== Population ===
At the time of the 2006 National Census, the rural district's population was 3,488 in 796 households. There were 3,498 inhabitants in 835 households at the following census of 2011. The 2016 census measured the population of the rural district as 3,321 in 1,017 households. The most populous of its 19 villages was Gowaravan, with 796 people.

=== Other villages in the rural district ===
- Khaneqah
- Nahran
- Nujeh Deh
