= Central District (Heris County) =

District in East Azerbaijan province, Iran

Central District (Heris County) Persian: بخش مرکزی شهرستان هریس
- District
- Location within Iran
- Coordinates: 38°12′N 47°03′E
- Country: Iran
- Province: East Azerbaijan
- County: Heris
- Established: 1989
- Capital: Heris

Population (2016)
  - Total: 40,558
- Time zone: UTC+3:30 (IRST)

The Central District of Heris County (Persian: بخش مرکزی شهرستان هریس) is in East Azerbaijan province, Iran. Its capital is the city of Heris.

== Demographics ==
=== Population ===
At the time of the 2006 National Census, the district's population was 37,475 in 8,915 households. The following census in 2011 counted 39,735 people in 10,657 households. The 2016 census measured the population of the district as 40,558 inhabitants in 12,109 households.

=== Administrative divisions ===
Central District (Heris County) Population
Administrative Divisions	2006	2011	2016
Baruq RD (Note: Merger of Mehranrud-e Shomali and Zarnaq Rural Districts)	1,883	1,863	1,828
Bedevostan-e Sharqi RD	5,729	5,948	5,984
Khanamrud RD	3,488	3,498	3,321
Bakhshayesh (city)	5,752	6,098	6,102
Heris (city)	9,513	9,823	10,515
Kolvanaq (city)	6,344	6,792	7,465
Zarnaq (city)	4,766	5,713	5,343
Total	37,475	39,735	40,558
RD = Rural District
