= Sheykh Rajab =

Sheykh Rajab شيخ رجب
- Village
- Location within Iran
- Coordinates: 38°10′18″N 46°51′18″E
- Country: Iran
- Province: East Azerbaijan
- County: Heris
- Bakhsh: Khvajeh
- Rural District: Bedevostan-e Gharbi

Population (2006)
  - Total: 825
- Time zone: UTC+3:30 (IRST)
  - Summer (DST): UTC+4:30 (IRDT)

Sheykh Rajab (Persian: شيخ رجب; also known as Sehrajab and Shekhradzhab) is a village in Bedevostan-e Gharbi Rural District, Khvajeh District, Heris County, East Azerbaijan Province, Iran. At the 2006 census, its population was 825, in 185 families.
