= Hafdaran =

Hafdaran هفدران
- Village
- Location within Iran
- Coordinates: 38°22′00″N 46°38′52″E
- Country: Iran
- Province: East Azerbaijan
- County: Heris
- Bakhsh: Khvajeh
- Rural District: Mavazekhan-e Shomali

Population (2006)
  - Total: 130
- Time zone: UTC+3:30 (IRST)
  - Summer (DST): UTC+4:30 (IRDT)

Hafdaran (Persian: هفدران, also Romanized as Hafdarān; also known as Haftārān, Haft Darān, Hendavān, and Khaftaran) is a village in Mavazekhan-e Shomali Rural District, Khvajeh District, Heris County, East Azerbaijan Province, Iran. At the 2006 census, its population was 130, in 35 families.
