= Tarp =

Tarp may refer to:

- Tarpaulin, a large sheet of strong, flexible, water resistant or waterproof material
  - Tarp tent
- Tarp, Denmark, a town in Esbjerg Municipality in Denmark
- Tarp, Germany, a municipality in Schleswig-Holstein in Germany
- Tarp, Iran, a village in East Azerbaijan Province, Iran
- Finn Tarp, Danish economist
- Fritz Tarp, Danish footballer
- Kirsten Gloerfelt-Tarp, Danish economist, politician, office manager and women's rights activist
- Lotte Tarp, Danish actress

TARP or T.A.R.P. may refer to:

- TARP (gene), a gene in humans
- Troubled Asset Relief Program, U.S. government financial bailout plan of 2008
- Terminal Identifier – Address Resolution Protocol, protocol defined in Telcordia
- Tunnel and Reservoir Plan, Chicago's Deep Tunnel
- Transmembrane AMPAR regulatory protein
- Translocated actin-recruiting phosphoprotein
- Tactical Airborne Reconnaissance Pod System, US Navy camera pod on the F-14
