= Joghanab =

Joghanab or Jaghnab or Jeghanab or Jaghanab (Persian: جغناب) may refer to:

- Joghanab, Ardabil
- Jeghanab, East Azerbaijan
- Joghanab-e Olya, East Azerbaijan Province
- Joghanab-e Sofla, East Azerbaijan Province
