= Sakh Selu =

Sakh Selu ساخسلو
- Village
- Location within Iran
- Coordinates: 38°08′55″N 46°45′03″E
- Country: Iran
- Province: East Azerbaijan
- County: Heris
- Bakhsh: Khvajeh
- Rural District: Bedevostan-e Gharbi

Population (2006)
  - Total: 128
- Time zone: UTC+3:30 (IRST)
  - Summer (DST): UTC+4:30 (IRDT)

Sakh Selu (Persian: ساخسلو, also Romanized as Sākh Selū, Sākhselū, Sakhasloo, Sākhaslū, and Sākheslū; also known as Sakhseli, Sākheşlī, and Sākhsūlī) is a village in Bedevostan-e Gharbi Rural District, Khvajeh District, Heris County, East Azerbaijan Province, Iran. At the 2006 census, its population was 128, in 33 families.
