= Moshirabad, Heris =

Moshirabad مشيراباد
- Village
- Location within Iran
- Coordinates: 38°21′15″N 46°35′24″E
- Country: Iran
- Province: East Azerbaijan
- County: Heris
- Bakhsh: Khvajeh
- Rural District: Mavazekhan-e Shomali

Population (2006)
  - Total: 166
- Time zone: UTC+3:30 (IRST)
  - Summer (DST): UTC+4:30 (IRDT)

Moshirabad (Persian: مشيراباد, also Romanized as Moshīrābād; also known as Mushur-abad and Shīrābād) is a village in Mavazekhan-e Shomali Rural District, Khvajeh District, Heris County, East Azerbaijan Province, Iran. At the 2006 census, its population was 166, in 29 families.
