= Hiaq, Khvajeh =

Hiaq هيق
- Village
- Location within Iran
- Coordinates: 38°20′15″N 46°40′26″E
- Country: Iran
- Province: East Azerbaijan
- County: Heris
- Bakhsh: Khvajeh
- Rural District: Mavazekhan-e Shomali

Population (2006)
  - Total: 238
- Time zone: UTC+3:30 (IRST)
  - Summer (DST): UTC+4:30 (IRDT)

Hiaq (Persian: هيق, also Romanized as Hīaq, and Hīyaq; also known as Īvā and Iya) is a village in Mavazekhan-e Shomali Rural District, Khvajeh District, Heris County, East Azerbaijan Province, Iran. At the 2006 census, its population was 238, in 53 families.
