= Qeshlaq-e Pain =

Qeshlaq-e Pain قشلاق پايين
- Village
- Location within Iran
- Coordinates: 38°21′25″N 46°30′01″E
- Country: Iran
- Province: East Azerbaijan
- County: Heris
- Bakhsh: Khvajeh
- Rural District: Mavazekhan-e Shomali

Population (2006)
  - Total: 132
- Time zone: UTC+3:30 (IRST)
  - Summer (DST): UTC+4:30 (IRDT)

Qeshlaq-e Pain (Persian: قشلاق پايين, also Romanized as Qeshlāq-e Pā'īn and Qeshlāq Pā’īn; also known as Kishlaa-Ashagi, Qeshlāq Ashāqī, Qeshlāq Soflá, and Qishlāq Ashāghi) is a village in Mavazekhan-e Shomali Rural District, Khvajeh District, Heris County, East Azerbaijan Province, Iran. At the 2006 census, its population was 132, in 32 families.
