= Hoseynabad, Heris =

Hoseynabad حسين اباد
- Village
- Location within Iran
- Coordinates: 38°20′08″N 46°38′45″E
- Country: Iran
- Province: East Azerbaijan
- County: Heris
- Bakhsh: Khvajeh
- Rural District: Mavazekhan-e Shomali

Population (2006)
  - Total: 32
- Time zone: UTC+3:30 (IRST)
  - Summer (DST): UTC+4:30 (IRDT)

Hoseynabad (Persian: حسين اباد, also Romanized as Ḩoseynābād and Hosein Abad; also known as Husainābād and Khoseynabad) is a village in Mavazekhan-e Shomali Rural District, Khvajeh District, Heris County, East Azerbaijan Province, Iran. At the 2006 census, its population was 32, in 7 families.
