= Daghdaghan =

Daghdaghan دغدغان
- Village
- Location within Iran
- Coordinates: 38°18′39″N 46°38′25″E
- Country: Iran
- Province: East Azerbaijan
- County: Heris
- Bakhsh: Khvajeh
- Rural District: Mavazekhan-e Shomali

Population (2006)
  - Total: 162
- Time zone: UTC+3:30 (IRST)
  - Summer (DST): UTC+4:30 (IRDT)

Daghdaghan (Persian: دغدغان, also Romanized as Daghdaghān; also known as Tokhtugan, Tūkhī Tūqān, and Tykhtugan) is a village in Mavazekhan-e Shomali Rural District, Khvajeh District, Heris County, East Azerbaijan Province, Iran. At the 2006 census, its population was 162, in 43 families.
