= Sorkheh Gav =

Sorkheh Gav سرخه گاو
- Village
- Location within Iran
- Coordinates: 38°22′01″N 46°40′13″E
- Country: Iran
- Province: East Azerbaijan
- County: Heris
- Bakhsh: Khvajeh
- Rural District: Mavazekhan-e Shomali

Population (2006)
  - Total: 150
- Time zone: UTC+3:30 (IRST)
  - Summer (DST): UTC+4:30 (IRDT)

Sorkheh Gav (Persian: سرخه گاو, also Romanized as Sorkheh Gāv; also known as Sirfagef, Sorkheh Kāv, and Syrfagef) is a village in Mavazekhan-e Shomali Rural District, Khvajeh District, Heris County, East Azerbaijan Province, Iran. At the 2006 census, its population was 150, in 32 families.
