= Vanyar, Iran =

Vanyar ونيار
- Village
- Location within Iran
- Coordinates: 38°07′00″N 46°24′18″E
- Country: Iran
- Province: East Azerbaijan
- County: Heris
- Bakhsh: Khvajeh
- Rural District: Mavazekhan-e Sharqi

Population (2006)
  - Total: 64
- Time zone: UTC+3:30 (IRST)
  - Summer (DST): UTC+4:30 (IRDT)

Vanyar (Persian: ونيار, also Romanized as Vanyār, Vanayār, and Vaneyār; also known as Banyār) is a village in Mavazekhan-e Sharqi Rural District, Khvajeh District, Heris County, East Azerbaijan Province, Iran. At the 2006 census, its population was 64, in 14 families.
