= Dibaklu =

Dibaklu (Persian: ديبكلو) may refer to:

- Dibaklu, Charuymaq
- Dibaklu, Heris
- Dibaklu, Sarab
