= Bashir, Iran =

Bashir بشير
- Village
- Location within Iran
- Coordinates: 38°15′01″N 46°39′38″E
- Country: Iran
- Province: East Azerbaijan
- County: Heris
- Bakhsh: Khvajeh
- Rural District: Mavazekhan-e Shomali

Population (2006)
  - Total: 268
- Time zone: UTC+3:30 (IRST)
  - Summer (DST): UTC+4:30 (IRDT)

Bashir (Persian: بشير, also Romanized as Bashīr and Beshīr) is a village in Mavazekhan-e Shomali Rural District, Khvajeh District, Heris County, East Azerbaijan Province, Iran. At the 2006 census, its population was 268, in 59 families.
