= Bajabaj =

Bajabaj باجاباج
- Village
- Location within Iran
- Coordinates: 38°21′39″N 46°42′32″E
- Country: Iran
- Province: East Azerbaijan
- County: Heris
- Bakhsh: Khvajeh
- Rural District: Mavazekhan-e Shomali

Population (2006)
  - Total: 342
- Time zone: UTC+3:30 (IRST)
  - Summer (DST): UTC+4:30 (IRDT)

Bajabaj (Persian: باجاباج, also Romanized as Bājābāj; also known as Badzhabash, Bājābāsh, Bājeh Bāj, and Bājeh Yāj) is a village in Mavazekhan-e Shomali Rural District, Khvajeh District, Heris County, East Azerbaijan Province, Iran. At the 2006 census, its population was 342, in 67 families.
