= Pakchin =

Pakchin پاكچين
- Village
- Location within Iran
- Coordinates: 38°08′37″N 46°25′36″E
- Country: Iran
- Province: East Azerbaijan
- County: Heris
- Bakhsh: Khvajeh
- Rural District: Mavazekhan-e Sharqi

Population (2006)
  - Total: 265
- Time zone: UTC+3:30 (IRST)
  - Summer (DST): UTC+4:30 (IRDT)

Pakchin (Persian: پاكچين, also Romanized as Pākchīn and Pākachīn; also known as Chavarchin, Pāg Chīn, Pākchīn-e ‘Olyā, Pakehchīn, and Pakeh Ḩoseyn) is a village in Mavazekhan-e Sharqi Rural District, Khvajeh District, Heris County, East Azerbaijan Province, Iran. At the 2006 census, its population was 265, in 57 families.
