= Chanzaq =

Chanzaq چنزق
- Village
- Location within Iran
- Coordinates: 38°15′00″N 46°36′00″E
- Country: Iran
- Province: East Azerbaijan
- County: Heris
- Bakhsh: Khvajeh
- Rural District: Mavazekhan-e Shomali

Population (2006)
  - Total: 126
- Time zone: UTC+3:30 (IRST)
  - Summer (DST): UTC+4:30 (IRDT)

Chanzaq (Persian: چنزق; also known as Chanza, Chanzagh, Chanzanaq, and Kanzaq) is a village in Mavazekhan-e Shomali Rural District, Khvajeh District, Heris County, East Azerbaijan Province, Iran. At the 2006 census, its population was 126, in 33 families.
