= Sulujeh =

Sulujeh سولوجه
- Village
- Location within Iran
- Coordinates: 38°09′33″N 46°29′02″E
- Country: Iran
- Province: East Azerbaijan
- County: Heris
- Bakhsh: Khvajeh
- Rural District: Mavazekhan-e Sharqi

Population (2006)
  - Total: 76
- Time zone: UTC+3:30 (IRST)
  - Summer (DST): UTC+4:30 (IRDT)

Sulujeh (Persian: سولوجه, also Romanized as Sūlūjeh and Soolloojeh; also known as Sūlījeh, Sūlojā, Suludzha, and Suluja) is a village in Mavazekhan-e Sharqi Rural District, Khvajeh District, Heris County, East Azerbaijan Province, Iran. At the 2006 census, its population was 76, in 23 families.
