= Alpavat =

Alpavat الپاوت
- Village
- Location within Iran
- Coordinates: 38°06′20″N 46°39′26″E
- Country: Iran
- Province: East Azerbaijan
- County: Heris
- Bakhsh: Khvajeh
- Rural District: Mavazekhan-e Sharqi

Population (2006)
  - Total: 69
- Time zone: UTC+3:30 (IRST)
  - Summer (DST): UTC+4:30 (IRDT)

Alpavat (Persian: الپاوت, also Romanized as Alpāvat and Ālpāvot) is a village in Mavazekhan-e Sharqi Rural District, Khvajeh District, Heris County, East Azerbaijan Province, Iran. At the 2006 census, its population was 69, in 19 families.

== Name ==
According to Vladimir Minorsky, the name of this village is derived from the Mongolian word alpā'ut, which referred to "a privileged class".
