= Marnab =

Marnab مرناب
- Village
- Location within Iran
- Coordinates: 38°10′42″N 46°26′32″E
- Country: Iran
- Province: East Azerbaijan
- County: Heris
- Bakhsh: Khvajeh
- Rural District: Mavazekhan-e Sharqi

Population (2006)
  - Total: 10
- Time zone: UTC+3:30 (IRST)
  - Summer (DST): UTC+4:30 (IRDT)

Marnab (Persian: مرناب, also Romanized as Marnāb; also known as Maranū) is a village in Mavazekhan-e Sharqi Rural District, Khvajeh District, Heris County, East Azerbaijan Province, Iran. At the 2006 census, its population was 10, in 4 families.
