= Bersun =

Bersun برسون
- Village
- Location within Iran
- Coordinates: 30°33′42″N 54°40′39″E
- Country: Iran
- Province: Kerman
- County: Shahr-e Babak
- Bakhsh: Dehaj
- Rural District: Khabar

Population (2006)
  - Total: 78
- Time zone: UTC+3:30 (IRST)
  - Summer (DST): UTC+4:30 (IRDT)

Bersun (Persian: برسون, also Romanized as Bersūn) is a village in Khabar Rural District, Dehaj District, Shahr-e Babak County, Kerman Province, Iran. At the 2006 census, its population was 78, in 12 families.
