= Kohan-e Sabz, Shahr-e Babak =

Kohan-e Sabz كهن سبز
- Village
- Country: Iran
- Province: Kerman
- County: Shahr-e Babak
- Bakhsh: Dehaj
- Rural District: Dehaj

Population (2006)
  - Total: 261
- Time zone: UTC+3:30 (IRST)
  - Summer (DST): UTC+4:30 (IRDT)

Kohan-e Sabz (Persian: كهن سبز; also known as Kahn-e Gījeh (Persian: كهن گيجه)) is a village in Dehaj Rural District, Dehaj District, Shahr-e Babak County, Kerman Province, Iran. At the 2006 census, its population was 261, in 45 families.
