= Chakhmaq Bolagh-e Olya =

Chakhmaq Bolagh-e Olya چخماق بلاغ عليا
- Village
- Location within Iran
- Coordinates: 38°23′39″N 46°42′53″E
- Country: Iran
- Province: East Azerbaijan
- County: Heris
- Bakhsh: Khvajeh
- Rural District: Mavazekhan-e Shomali

Population (2006)
  - Total: 38
- Time zone: UTC+3:30 (IRST)
  - Summer (DST): UTC+4:30 (IRDT)

Chakhmaq Bolagh-e Olya (Persian: چخماق بلاغ عليا, also Romanized as Chakhmāq Bolāgh-e ‘Olyā; also known as Chakhmakh-bulag-Okhary, Chakhmāq Bolāgh Bālā, Chakhmāq Bolāgh-e Bālā, Chākhmāqbolāgh-e ‘Olyā, Chakhmāq Bolāgh-e Yūkhārī, and Chaqmāq Bulāgh Yukāri) is a village in Mavazekhan-e Shomali Rural District, Khvajeh District, Heris County, East Azerbaijan Province, Iran. At the 2006 census, its population was 38, in 8 families. As of 2026, it is likely that the village is either abandoned or has a population of ~15.
