= Chakhmaq Bolagh =

Chakhmaq Bolagh (Persian: چخماق بلاغ), also rendered as Chakhmakh-bulag or Chakhmaqbolaq or Chaqmaq Bulagh or Khomaq Bolagh may refer to:

- Chakhmaq Bolagh-e Olya
- Chakhmaq Bolagh-e Sofla
