= Chubanlar-e Sardarlu =

Village in East Azerbaijan province, Iran

Chubanlar-e Sardarlu Persian: چوبانلارسردارلو
- Village
- Location within Iran
- Coordinates: 38°22′24″N 46°45′13″E
- Country: Iran
- Province: East Azerbaijan
- County: Heris
- District: Khvajeh
- Rural District: Mavazekhan-e Shomali

Population (2016)
  - Total: 267
- Time zone: UTC+3:30 (IRST)

Chubanlar-e Sardarlu (Persian: چوبانلارسردارلو) (Note: Also romanized as Chūbānlār-e Sardārlū; also known as Chobanar, Chobānlār Sardārlū, Chūpānlār, Chūpānlār Sardārlū, and Chūpānlār-e Sardārlū) is a village in Mavazekhan-e Shomali Rural District of Khvajeh District in Heris County, East Azerbaijan province, Iran.

== Demographics ==
=== Population ===
At the time of the 2006 National Census, the village's population was 427 in 92 households. The following census in 2011 counted 346 people in 98 households. The 2016 census measured the population of the village as 267 people in 86 households.
