= Hanjarak-e Bala =

Hanjarak-e Bala هنجرك بالا
- Village
- Location within Iran
- Coordinates: 30°30′26″N 54°34′27″E
- Country: Iran
- Province: Kerman
- County: Shahr-e Babak
- Bakhsh: Dehaj
- Rural District: Khabar

Population (2006)
  - Total: 42
- Time zone: UTC+3:30 (IRST)
  - Summer (DST): UTC+4:30 (IRDT)

Hanjarak-e Bala (Persian: هنجرك بالا, also Romanized as Hanjarak-e Bālā; also known as Hajrak, Hanjarak, and Khanjarak) is a village in Khabar Rural District, Dehaj District, Shahr-e Babak County, Kerman Province, Iran. At the 2006 census, its population was 42, in 9 families.
