= Taraf (disambiguation) =

Taraf may refer to:

- Taraf, a Turkish newspaper
- Taraf (musical band), a type of folk music band in Romania and Moldova
- Taraf, Iran, a village in East Azerbaijan Province, Iran
- Taraf, Kerman, a village in Kerman Province, Iran
- Taraf (subdivision), a lesser administrative subdivision used in the Indian subcontinent
- Taraf Kingdom, medieval kingdom in northeastern Bangladesh
- Taraf TV, a Romanian TV channel
- Taraf string, a sympathetic string in some musical instruments
- Lagonda Taraf, a British car
