= Suli Daraq =

Suli Daraq (Persian: سولي درق) may refer to:

- Suli Daraq, Ardabil
- Suli Daraq, Heris, East Azerbaijan Province
- Suli Daraq, Kaleybar, East Azerbaijan Province
