= Lowgerd =

Lowgerd لوگرد
- Village
- Location within Iran
- Coordinates: 30°34′26″N 54°56′55″E
- Country: Iran
- Province: Kerman
- County: Shahr-e Babak
- Bakhsh: Dehaj
- Rural District: Dehaj

Population (2006)
  - Total: 216
- Time zone: UTC+3:30 (IRST)
  - Summer (DST): UTC+4:30 (IRDT)

Lowgerd (Persian: لوگرد; also known as Labgerd) is a village in Dehaj Rural District, Dehaj District, Shahr-e Babak County, Kerman Province, Iran. At the 2006 census, its population was 216, in 54 families.
