= Afshord =

Village in East Azerbaijan province, Iran

Afshord Persian: افشرد
- Village
- Location within Iran
- Coordinates: 38°20′04″N 46°32′48″E
- Country: Iran
- Province: East Azerbaijan
- County: Heris
- District: Khvajeh
- Rural District: Mavazekhan-e Shomali

Population (2016)
  - Total: 272
- Time zone: UTC+3:30 (IRST)

Afshord (Persian: افشرد) (Note: Also known as Ābshārī and Ovshar) is a village in Mavazekhan-e Shomali Rural District of Khvajeh District in Heris County, East Azerbaijan province, Iran.

== Demographics ==
=== Population ===
At the time of the 2006 National Census, the village's population was 527 in 104 households. The following census in 2011 counted 440 people in 107 households. The 2016 census measured the population of the village as 272 people in 81 households.
