= Shamlu, East Azerbaijan =

Shamlou شاملو
- Village
- Location within Iran
- Coordinates: 38°07′47″N 46°40′41″E
- Country: Iran
- Province: East Azerbaijan
- County: Heris
- Bakhsh: Khvajeh
- Rural District: Bedevostan-e Gharbi

Population (2006)
  - Total: 295
- Time zone: UTC+3:30 (IRST)
  - Summer (DST): UTC+4:30 (IRDT)

Shamlu (Persian: شاملو, also Romanized as Shāmloū and Shamloo; also known as Imicha and Omīdcheh) is a village in Bedevostan-e Gharbi Rural District, Khvajeh District, Heris County, East Azerbaijan Province, Iran. At the 2006 census, its population was 295, in 69 families.
