= Chay Kandi, Heris =

Village in East Azerbaijan province, Iran

Chay Kandi Persian: چاي كندي
- Village
- Location within Iran
- Coordinates: 38°22′34″N 46°42′05″E
- Country: Iran
- Province: East Azerbaijan
- County: Heris
- District: Khvajeh
- Rural District: Mavazekhan-e Shomali

Population (2016)
  - Total: 468
- Time zone: UTC+3:30 (IRST)

Chay Kandi (Persian: چاي كندي) (Note: Also romanized as Chāy Kandī) is a village in Mavazekhan-e Shomali Rural District of Khvajeh District in Heris County, East Azerbaijan province, Iran.

== Demographics ==
=== Population ===
At the time of the 2006 National Census, the village's population was 424 in 90 households. The following census in 2011 counted 374 people in 98 households. The 2016 census measured the population of the village as 468 people in 138 households.
