= Underground =

Underground most commonly refers to:

- Subterranea (geography), the regions beneath the surface of the Earth

Underground may also refer to:

== Places ==
- Buenos Aires Underground, a rapid transit system
- London Underground, a rapid transit system
- The Underground (Boston), a music club in the Allston neighborhood of Boston
- The Underground (Stoke concert venue), a club/music venue based in Hanley, Stoke-on-Trent
- Underground (Manhattan), a music club (1980–1989) in Manhattan
- Underground Atlanta, a shopping and entertainment district in the Five Points neighborhood of downtown Atlanta, Georgia
- Underground City, Montreal
- Underground city, a series of linked subterranean spaces
- Underground living, modes of living below the ground's surface

== Transport ==
- London Underground, Metro network in London

== Arts, entertainment, and media ==
=== Films ===
- Underground (1928 film), a drama by Anthony Asquith
- Underground (1941 film), a war drama by Vincent Sherman
- Underground (1970 film), a war drama starring Robert Goulet
- Underground (1976 film), a documentary about the radical organization the Weathermen
- Underground, a 1989 film featuring Melora Walters
- Underground (1995 film), a film by Emir Kusturica
- Underground, a 2007 British independent film starring Mark Strange
- Underground (2020 film), a/k/a Souterrain, a drama directed by Sophie Dupuis
- Underground: The Julian Assange Story, a 2012 Australian television film on Julian Assange for Network Ten

=== Games ===
- Underground (role-playing game), a satirical superhero game
- Underground, an expansion pack for Tom Clancy's The Division
- Medal of Honor: Underground, a 2000 first-person shooter
- Need for Speed: Underground, a 2003 racing video game
- Need for Speed: Underground 2, a 2004 racing video game
- Tony Hawk's Underground, a 2003 skateboarding video game
- Tony Hawk's Underground 2, a 2004 skateboarding video game
- Underground Zone, the first level in Sonic the Hedgehog 2 (8-bit)
- Undertale, an indie role-playing game

=== Literature ===
- Underground (Dreyfus book), a 1997 nonfiction book about computer hacking
- Underground (McGahan novel), by Andrew McGahan
- Underground (Murakami book), a 1998 collection of interviews about the Tokyo sarin gas attack
- Underground comix, small press or self-published comic books that are often socially relevant or satirical in nature
- BaMahteret (lit. Underground), a newspaper of the Lehi (militant group)
- The Underground (Animorphs), by K. A. Applegate
- The Underground (Left Behind: The Kids), by Jerry B. Jenkins and Tim LaHaye

=== Music ===
==== Albums ====
- Underground, by Analog Pussy, 2001
- Underground (Chris Potter album), 2006
- Underground (Courtney Pine album), 1997
- Underground (The Electric Prunes album), 1967
- Underground (soundtrack), by Goran Bregović, 2000
- Underground (Graham Bonnet album), 1997
- Underground (Jayo Felony album), 1999
- Underground, by Messiah, 1994
- Underground (Phil Keaggy album), 1983
- Underground (Thelonious Monk album), 1968
- Underground (Twinkle Brothers album), 1982
- Underground Vol. 1: 1991–1994, a compilation album by Three 6 Mafia, 1999
- Underground Vol. 2: Club Memphis, a compilation album by Three 6 Mafia, 1999

==== Songs ====
- "Underground" (Ben Folds Five song), 1995
- "Underground" (David Bowie song), featured in the film Labyrinth
- "Underground" (Evermore song), 2010
- "Underground", by Adam Lambert from The Original High, 2015
- "Underground", by Circa Zero from Circus Hero, 2013
- "Underground", by Curtis Mayfield from Roots, 1970
- "Underground", by Decadence from Undergrounder, 2017
- "Underground", by Eminem from Relapse, 2009
- "Underground", by Gentle Giant from Civilian, 1980
- "Underground", by Hayley Kiyoko from Panorama, 2022
- "Underground", by Jane's Addiction from The Great Escape Artist, 2011
- "Underground", by Men at Work from Business as Usual, 1981
- "Underground", by @onefive from 1518, 2022
- "Underground", by Pokey LaFarge from Something In The Water, 2015
- "Underground", by The Tea Party from Triptych, 1999
- "Underground", by Tom Waits from Swordfishtrombones, 1983
- "The Underground", by Mani Spinx, 2008

==== Other uses in music ====
- Underground music, a variety of music subgenres

=== Television ===
- Underground (TV series), a 2016 American television drama series
- TCM Underground, a weekly cult-film showcase
- The Underground (TV series), a sketch comedy show
- "Underground" (Armchair Theatre), a 1958 British television drama, part of Armchair Theatre
- "Underground" (Stargate Atlantis), an episode of Stargate Atlantis
- "Underground" (BoJack Horseman), an episode of BoJack Horseman
- "Underground", a Transformers: Armada episode

=== Other uses in arts, entertainment, and media ===
- Underground (play), by Michael Sloane
- Underground press, independent counterculture publications
- Underground producciones, an Argentine producer of TV series

== Groups and organizations ==
- Narodnaya Volya, an underground group in late 19th-century Russia
- Resistance movement
  - Resistance during World War II, with some groups sometimes referred to informally as "The Underground"
    - Polish Underground State (Polish: Polskie Państwo Podziemne), 1939-1945
- Weather Underground, a clandestine far-left terrorist group which operated in the US between 1969 and 1977

== Other uses ==
- Underground economy, a market system operating outside of legal regulations
- UK underground, a counter-cultural movement in the UK
- UK underground rap, a 2020s music scene in the UK
- Underground Railroad, an informal network of secret routes and safe houses
- The Underground (roller coaster), a wooden roller coaster at Adventureland (Iowa)
- Underground mining (hard rock), removal of valuable minerals from below the Earth's surface

== See also ==
- Rapid transit, rail-based transportation systems, which often operate in tunnels
- Underground culture (disambiguation)
- Underground 2 (disambiguation)
- 6 Underground (disambiguation)
- Overground (disambiguation)
