= Qareh Guni, Heris =

Qareh Guni قره گوني
- Village
- Location within Iran
- Coordinates: 38°19′18″N 46°55′37″E
- Country: Iran
- Province: East Azerbaijan
- County: Heris
- Bakhsh: Khvajeh
- Rural District: Bedevostan-e Gharbi

Population (2006)
  - Total: 28
- Time zone: UTC+3:30 (IRST)
  - Summer (DST): UTC+4:30 (IRDT)

Qareh Guni (Persian: قره گوني, also Romanized as Qareh Gūnī, Qara Gunei, and Qareh Gowney; also known as Ghareh Gooni Badostan, Karaguney, and Qareh Gūnīr) is a village in Bedevostan-e Gharbi Rural District, Khvajeh District, Heris County, East Azerbaijan Province, Iran. At the 2006 census, its population was 28, in 9 families.
