= Suli Daraq, Heris =

Suli Daraq سولي درق
- Village
- Location within Iran
- Coordinates: 38°21′19″N 46°38′18″E
- Country: Iran
- Province: East Azerbaijan
- County: Heris
- Bakhsh: Khvajeh
- Rural District: Mavazekhan-e Shomali

Population (2006)
  - Total: 41
- Time zone: UTC+3:30 (IRST)
  - Summer (DST): UTC+4:30 (IRDT)

Suli Daraq (Persian: سولي درق, also Romanized as Sūlī Daraq; also known as Sul’dera and Suli Darreh) is a village in Mavazekhan-e Shomali Rural District, Khvajeh District, Heris County, East Azerbaijan Province, Iran. At the 2006 census, its population was 41, in 11 families.
