= Ramjerd-e Bala =

Ramjerd-e Bala رمجردبالا
- Village
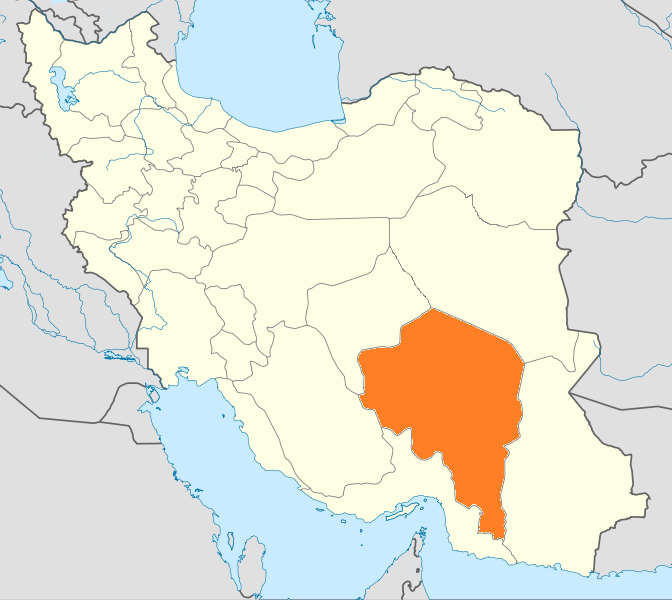
- Location of Kerman within Iran
- Country: Iran
- Province: Kerman
- County: Shahr-e Babak
- Bakhsh: Dehaj
- Rural District: Jowzam

Population (2006)
  - Total: 33
- Time zone: UTC+3:30 (IRST)
  - Summer (DST): UTC+4:30 (IRDT)

Ramjerd-e Bala (Persian: رمجردبالا, also Romanized as Ramjerd-e Bālā) is a village in Jowzam Rural District, Dehaj District, Shahr-e Babak County, Kerman Province, Iran. At the 2006 census, its population was 33, in 6 families.
