= Quyujaq, Heris =

Quyujaq قويوجاق
- Village
- Location within Iran
- Coordinates: 38°06′31″N 46°42′23″E
- Country: Iran
- Province: East Azerbaijan
- County: Heris
- Bakhsh: Khvajeh
- Rural District: Mavazekhan-e Sharqi

Population (2006)
  - Total: 26
- Time zone: UTC+3:30 (IRST)
  - Summer (DST): UTC+4:30 (IRDT)

Quyujaq (Persian: قويوجاق, also Romanized as Qūyūjāq; also known as Ghooijagh, Gūyjākh, Kuījakh, Kuydzha, Qayūjākh, Qūījāq, and Qūyjāq) is a village in Mavazekhan-e Sharqi Rural District, Khvajeh District, Heris County, East Azerbaijan Province, Iran. At the 2006 census, its population was 26, in 7 families.
