= Bon Tut =

Bon Tut بن توت
- Village
- Location within Iran
- Coordinates: 30°27′22″N 55°13′09″E
- Country: Iran
- Province: Kerman
- County: Shahr-e Babak
- Bakhsh: Dehaj
- Rural District: Jowzam

Population (2006)
  - Total: 40
- Time zone: UTC+3:30 (IRST)
  - Summer (DST): UTC+4:30 (IRDT)

Bon Tut (Persian: بن توت, also Romanized as Bon Tūt) is a village in Jowzam Rural District, Dehaj District, Shahr-e Babak County, Kerman Province, Iran. At the 2006 census, its population was 40, in 18 families.
