= Rugushuiyeh =

Rugushuiyeh or Rogushuiyeh or Rugoshuiyeh (Persian: روگوشوئيه) may refer to:

- Rugushuiyeh-ye Olya
- Rugushuiyeh-ye Sofla
