= Zaruiyeh =

Zaruiyeh (Persian: زاروييه) may refer to:

- Zaruiyeh-ye Olya
- Zaruiyeh-ye Sofla
