= Abd ol-Jabbar, East Azerbaijan province =

Abd ol Jabbar عبدالجبار
- Village
- Location within Iran
- Coordinates: 38°16′57″N 46°44′48″E
- Country: Iran
- Province: East Azerbaijan
- County: Heris
- Bakhsh: Khvajeh
- Rural District: Bedevostan-e Gharbi

Population (2006)
  - Total: 177
- Time zone: UTC+3:30 (IRST)
  - Summer (DST): UTC+4:30 (IRDT)

Abd ol Jabbar (Persian: عبدالجبار, also Romanized as ‘Abd ol Jabbār) is a village in Bedevostan-e Gharbi Rural District, Khvajeh District, Heris County, East Azerbaijan Province, Iran. At the 2006 census, its population was 177, in 35 families.
