= Saray, East Azerbaijan =

Village in East Azerbaijan province, Iran

Saray Persian: سراي
- Village
- Location within Iran
- Coordinates: 38°13′29″N 46°55′53″E
- Country: Iran
- Province: East Azerbaijan
- County: Heris
- District: Khvajeh
- Rural District: Bedevostan-e Gharbi

Population (2016)
  - Total: 1,484
- Time zone: UTC+3:30 (IRST)

Saray (Persian: سراي) (Note: Also romanized as Sarai, Sarāy, and Seray) is a village in Bedevostan-e Gharbi Rural District of Khvajeh District in Heris County, East Azerbaijan province, Iran.

== Demographics ==
=== Population ===
At the time of the 2006 National Census, the village's population was 1,501 in 342 households. The following census in 2011 counted 1,495 people in 373 households. The 2016 census measured the population of the village as 1,484 people in 475 households.
