= Amandi, Iran =

Village in East Azerbaijan province, Iran

Amandi Persian: امندي
- Village
- Location within Iran
- Coordinates: 38°06′58″N 46°34′51″E
- Country: Iran
- Province: East Azerbaijan
- County: Heris
- District: Khvajeh
- Rural District: Mavazekhan-e Sharqi

Population (2016)
  - Total: 870
- Time zone: UTC+3:30 (IRST)

Amandi (Persian: امندي) (Note: Also romanized as Amandī, Amandy, and Ammandī; also known as Amand) is a village in Mavazekhan-e Sharqi Rural District of Khvajeh District in Heris County, East Azerbaijan province, Iran.

== Demographics ==
=== Population ===
At the time of the 2006 National Census, the village's population was 847 in 196 households. The following census in 2011 counted 771 people in 222 households. The 2016 census measured the population of the village as 870 people in 257 households.
