= Kahlik Bolaghi, East Azerbaijan =

Kahlik Bolaghi كهليك بلاغي
- Village
- Location within Iran
- Coordinates: 38°09′50″N 46°26′52″E
- Country: Iran
- Province: East Azerbaijan
- County: Heris
- Bakhsh: Khvajeh
- Rural District: Mavazekhan-e Sharqi

Population (2006)
  - Total: 35
- Time zone: UTC+3:30 (IRST)
  - Summer (DST): UTC+4:30 (IRDT)

Kahlik Bolaghi (Persian: كهليك بلاغي, also Romanized as Kahlīk Bolāghī; also known as Kahlak Bolāghī, Kahlek Boolaghi, Kahlek Bouāghī, Kailikh Bulāgh, and Kiilikhbulag) is a village in Mavazekhan-e Sharqi Rural District, Khvajeh District, Heris County, East Azerbaijan Province, Iran. At the 2006 census, its population was 35, in 7 families.
