= Torsh Kuh =

Torsh Kuh or Torshkuh (Persian: ترشكوه) may refer to:

- Torshkuh, Gilan
- Torsh Kuh, Kerman
