= Shenguiyeh-ye Pain =

Shenguiyeh-ye Pain شنگوئيه پائين
- Village
- Location within Iran
- Coordinates: 30°27′28″N 54°55′27″E
- Country: Iran
- Province: Kerman
- County: Shahr-e Babak
- Bakhsh: Dehaj
- Rural District: Jowzam

Population (2006)
  - Total: 17
- Time zone: UTC+3:30 (IRST)
  - Summer (DST): UTC+4:30 (IRDT)

Shenguiyeh-ye Pain (Persian: شنگوئيه پائين, also Romanized as Shengū’īyeh-ye Pā’īn; also known as Shengūyeh-ye Soflá) is a village in Jowzam Rural District, Dehaj District, Shahr-e Babak County, Kerman Province, Iran. At the 2006 census, its population was 17, in 4 families.
