= Chah Bereshk =

Chah Bereshk چاه برشك
- Village
- Location within Iran
- Coordinates: 30°41′04″N 54°44′36″E
- Country: Iran
- Province: Kerman
- County: Shahr-e Babak
- Bakhsh: Dehaj
- Rural District: Dehaj

Population (2006)
  - Total: 71
- Time zone: UTC+3:30 (IRST)
  - Summer (DST): UTC+4:30 (IRDT)

Chah Bereshk (Persian: چاه برشك, also Romanized as Chāh Bereshk) is a village in Dehaj Rural District, Dehaj District, Shahr-e Babak County, Kerman Province, Iran. At the 2006 census, its population was 71, in 20 families.
