= Gavij, East Azerbaijan =

Village in East Azerbaijan province, Iran

Gavij Persian: گويج
- Village
- Location within Iran
- Coordinates: 38°19′56″N 46°34′38″E
- Country: Iran
- Province: East Azerbaijan
- County: Heris
- District: Khvajeh
- Rural District: Mavazekhan-e Shomali

Population (2016)
  - Total: 551
- Time zone: UTC+3:30 (IRST)

Gavij (Persian: گويج) (Note: Also romanized as Gavīj, Gevīj, and Govīj; also known as Chivi, Kevīj, Kivi, Kīvīch, Kīvīj, and Kovij) is a village in Mavazekhan-e Shomali Rural District of Khvajeh District in Heris County, East Azerbaijan province, Iran.

== Demographics ==
=== Population ===
At the time of the 2006 National Census, the village's population was 768 in 167 households. The following census in 2011 counted 637 people in 172 households. The 2016 census measured the population of the village as 551 people in 176 households. It was the most populous village in its rural district.
