= Gugarchin, East Azerbaijan =

Gugarchin گوگرچين
- Village
- Location within Iran
- Coordinates: 38°09′23″N 46°31′00″E
- Country: Iran
- Province: East Azerbaijan
- County: Heris
- Bakhsh: Khvajeh
- Rural District: Mavazekhan-e Sharqi

Population (2006)
  - Total: 28
- Time zone: UTC+3:30 (IRST)
  - Summer (DST): UTC+4:30 (IRDT)

Gugarchin (Persian: گوگرچين, also Romanized as Gūgarchīn; also known as Govarchīn, Gūvarchin, and Kuvarchin) is a village in Mavazekhan-e Sharqi Rural District, Khvajeh District, Heris County, East Azerbaijan Province, Iran. At the 2006 census, its population was 28, in 10 families.
