= Qarajeh, Heris =

Village in East Azerbaijan province, Iran

Qarajeh Persian: قراجه
- Village
- Location within Iran
- Coordinates: 38°14′18″N 46°46′04″E
- Country: Iran
- Province: East Azerbaijan
- County: Heris
- District: Khvajeh
- Rural District: Bedevostan-e Gharbi

Population (2016)
  - Total: 1,089
- Time zone: UTC+3:30 (IRST)

Qarajeh (Persian: قراجه) (Note: Also romanized as Qarājeh; also known as Karaja and Qarah Jeh) is a village in Bedevostan-e Gharbi Rural District of Khvajeh District in Heris County, East Azerbaijan province, Iran.

== Demographics ==
=== Population ===
At the time of the 2006 National Census, the village's population was 1,081 in 215 households. The following census in 2011 counted 957 people in 253 households. The 2016 census measured the population of the village as 1,089 people in 323 households.
