= Chakhmaq Bolagh-e Sofla =

Chakhmaq Bolagh-e Sofla چخماق بلاغ سفلي
- Village
- Location within Iran
- Coordinates: 38°23′34″N 46°42′04″E
- Country: Iran
- Province: East Azerbaijan
- County: Heris
- Bakhsh: Khvajeh
- Rural District: Mavazekhan-e Shomali

Population (2006)
  - Total: 98
- Time zone: UTC+3:30 (IRST)
  - Summer (DST): UTC+4:30 (IRDT)

Chakhmaq Bolagh-e Sofla (Persian: چخماق بلاغ سفلي, also Romanized as Chakhmāq Bolāgh-e Soflá; also known as Chakhmakh-bulag-Ashagi, Chakhmāq Bolāgh-e Ashāqi, Chakhmāq Bolāgh-e Pā'īn, Chakhmāq Bolāgh Pā’īn, Chākhmāqbolāq-e Soflā, Chaqmāq Bulāgh Ashāghi, and Khomāq Bolāgh-e Ashāqi) is a village in Mavazekhan-e Shomali Rural District, Khvajeh District, Heris County, East Azerbaijan Province, Iran. At the 2006 census, its population was 98, in 22 families.
