= Nahand, East Azerbaijan =

Village in East Azerbaijan province, Iran

Nahand Persian: نهند
- Village
- Location within Iran
- Coordinates: 38°15′09″N 46°28′12″E
- Country: Iran
- Province: East Azerbaijan
- County: Heris
- District: Khvajeh
- Rural District: Mavazekhan-e Sharqi

Population (2016)
  - Total: 1,061
- Time zone: UTC+3:30 (IRST)

Nahand (Persian: نهند) (Note: Also known as Nagyān and Nagyant) is a village in Mavazekhan-e Sharqi Rural District of Khvajeh District in Heris County, East Azerbaijan province, Iran.

== Demographics ==
=== Population ===
At the time of the 2006 National Census, the village's population was 1,222 in 304 households. The following census in 2011 counted 990 people in 288 households. The 2016 census measured the population of the village as 1,061 people in 327 households. It was the most populous village in its rural district.
