= Shahrak-e Pain =

Shahrak-e Pain شهرك پايين
- Village
- Location within Iran
- Coordinates: 38°11′37″N 46°41′52″E
- Country: Iran
- Province: East Azerbaijan
- County: Heris
- Bakhsh: Khvajeh
- Rural District: Bedevostan-e Gharbi

Population (2006)
  - Total: 686
- Time zone: UTC+3:30 (IRST)
  - Summer (DST): UTC+4:30 (IRDT)

Shahrak-e Pain (Persian: شهرك پايين, also romanized as Shahrak-e Pā’īn; also known as Nizhnyaya Shayryay, Now Shahrak, Shabrak, Shahrak, and Shahrak Tāzeh) is a village in Bedevostan-e Gharbi Rural District, Khvajeh District, Heris County, East Azerbaijan Province, Iran. At the 2006 census, its population was 686, in 150 families.
