= Zarduiyeh =

Zarduiyeh زاردوييه
- Village
- Location within Iran
- Coordinates: 30°38′00″N 54°54′00″E
- Country: Iran
- Province: Kerman
- County: Shahr-e Babak
- Bakhsh: Dehaj
- Rural District: Dehaj

Population (2006)
  - Total: 422
- Time zone: UTC+3:30 (IRST)
  - Summer (DST): UTC+4:30 (IRDT)

Zarduiyeh (Persian: زاردوييه, also Romanized as Zardū’īyeh; also known as Zardūn) is a village in Dehaj Rural District, Dehaj District, Shahr-e Babak County, Kerman Province, Iran. At the 2006 census, its population was 422, in 84 families.
