= Gamand =

Village in East Azerbaijan province, Iran

Gamand Persian: گمند
- Village
- Location within Iran
- Coordinates: 38°06′39″N 46°27′35″E
- Country: Iran
- Province: East Azerbaijan
- County: Heris
- District: Khvajeh
- Rural District: Mavazekhan-e Sharqi

Population (2016)
  - Total: 891
- Time zone: UTC+3:30 (IRST)

Gamand (Persian: گمند) (Note: Also romanized as Gomand; also known as Gomān, Gumant, Kamand, Kommand, and Tyutant) is a village in Mavazekhan-e Sharqi Rural District of Khvajeh District in Heris County, East Azerbaijan province, Iran.

== Demographics ==
=== Population ===
At the time of the 2006 National Census, the village's population was 924 in 182 households. The following census in 2011 counted 814 people in 213 households. The 2016 census measured the population of the village as 891 people in 251 households.
