= Amarduiyeh =

Amarduiyeh امردوئيه
- Village
- Location within Iran
- Coordinates: 30°31′10″N 55°05′16″E
- Country: Iran
- Province: Kerman
- County: Shahr-e Babak
- Bakhsh: Dehaj
- Rural District: Jowzam

Population (2006)
  - Total: 72
- Time zone: UTC+3:30 (IRST)
  - Summer (DST): UTC+4:30 (IRDT)

Amarduiyeh (Persian: امردوئيه, also Romanized as Amardū’īyeh) is a village in Jowzam Rural District, Dehaj District, Shahr-e Babak County, Kerman Province, Iran. At the 2006 census, its population was 72, in 21 families.
