= Sineh-ye Ghaz =

Sineh-ye Ghaz سينه غاز
- Village
- Location within Iran
- Coordinates: 30°36′22″N 54°50′42″E
- Country: Iran
- Province: Kerman
- County: Shahr-e Babak
- Bakhsh: Dehaj
- Rural District: Dehaj

Population (2006)
  - Total: 44
- Time zone: UTC+3:30 (IRST)
  - Summer (DST): UTC+4:30 (IRDT)

Sineh-ye Ghaz (Persian: سينه غاز, also Romanized as Sīnh-ye Ghāz; also known as Sina Khwār, Sīneh Kherār, Sīneh Khrār, and Sīneh-ye Khvār) is a village in Dehaj Rural District, Dehaj District, Shahr-e Babak County, Kerman Province, Iran. At the 2006 census, its population was 44, in 13 families.
