= Baduiyeh-ye Olya =

Baduiyeh-ye Olya بادوييه عليا
- Village
- Location within Iran
- Coordinates: 30°33′23″N 54°55′30″E
- Country: Iran
- Province: Kerman
- County: Shahr-e Babak
- Bakhsh: Dehaj
- Rural District: Dehaj

Population (2006)
  - Total: 169
- Time zone: UTC+3:30 (IRST)
  - Summer (DST): UTC+4:30 (IRDT)

Baduiyeh-ye Olya (Persian: بادوييه عليا, also Romanized as Bādūīyeh-ye ‘Olyā; also known as Bādūeeyeh-ye ‘Olyā) is a village in Dehaj Rural District, Dehaj District, Shahr-e Babak County, Kerman Province, Iran. At the 2006 census, its population was 169, in 42 families.
