= Estiar, Heris =

Estiar استيار
- Village
- Location within Iran
- Coordinates: 38°15′11″N 46°32′14″E
- Country: Iran
- Province: East Azerbaijan
- County: Heris
- Bakhsh: Khvajeh
- Rural District: Mavazekhan-e Sharqi

Population (2006)
  - Total: 266
- Time zone: UTC+3:30 (IRST)
  - Summer (DST): UTC+4:30 (IRDT)

Estiar (Persian: استيار, also Romanized as Estīār and Astīār; also known as Estiaré Mavazé Khan and Istiar) is a village in Mavazekhan-e Sharqi Rural District, Khvajeh District, Heris County, East Azerbaijan Province, Iran. At the 2006 census, its population was 266, in 55 families.
