= Kuhsar-e Bala =

Kuhsar-e Bala كوهساربالا
- Village
- Country: Iran
- Province: Kerman
- County: Shahr-e Babak
- Bakhsh: Dehaj
- Rural District: Dehaj

Population (2006)
  - Total: 197
- Time zone: UTC+3:30 (IRST)
  - Summer (DST): UTC+4:30 (IRDT)

Kuhsar-e Bala (Persian: كوهساربالا, also Romanized as Kūhsār-e Bālā; also known as Esrakh-e Kūhsār-e Bālā (Persian: آسرخ كهسوبالا)) is a village in Dehaj Rural District, Dehaj District, Shahr-e Babak County, Kerman Province, Iran. At the 2006 census, its population was 197, in 28 families.
