= Jeghanab, East Azerbaijan =

Jeghanab جیغانو کندی
- Village
- Location within Iran
- Coordinates: 38°16′10″N 46°42′36″E
- Country: Iran
- Province: East Azerbaijan
- County: Heris
- Bakhsh: Khvajeh
- Rural District: Bedevostan-e Gharbi

Population (2006)
  - Total: 449
- Time zone: UTC+3:30 (IRST)
  - Summer (DST): UTC+4:30 (IRDT)

Jeghanab (Persian: جغناب, also Romanized as Jeghanāb and Jaghanāb; also known as Dzhigana, Jeqanāb, Jiganāb, and Joghnab) is a village in Bedevostan-e Gharbi Rural District, Khvajeh District, Heris County, East Azerbaijan Province, Iran. At the 2006 census, its population was 449, in 93 families.
