= Murpahn-e Bala =

Murpahn-e Bala مورپهن بالا
- Village
- Location within Iran
- Coordinates: 30°29′11″N 55°03′24″E
- Country: Iran
- Province: Kerman
- County: Shahr-e Babak
- Bakhsh: Dehaj
- Rural District: Jowzam

Population (2006)
  - Total: 81
- Time zone: UTC+3:30 (IRST)
  - Summer (DST): UTC+4:30 (IRDT)

Murpahn-e Bala (Persian: مورپهن بالا, also Romanized as Mūrpahn-e Bālā) is a village in Jowzam Rural District, Dehaj District, Shahr-e Babak County, Kerman Province, Iran. At the 2006 census, its population was 81, in 24 families.
