= Senjeduiyeh, Shahr-e Babak =

Senjeduiyeh سنجدوئيه
- Village
- Country: Iran
- Province: Kerman
- County: Shahr-e Babak
- Bakhsh: Dehaj
- Rural District: Khabar

Population (2006)
  - Total: 33
- Time zone: UTC+3:30 (IRST)
  - Summer (DST): UTC+4:30 (IRDT)

Senjeduiyeh (Persian: سنجدوئيه, also Romanized as Senjedū’īyeh) is a village in Khabar Rural District, Dehaj District, Shahr-e Babak County, Kerman Province, Iran. At the 2006 census, its population was 33, in 4 families.
