= Bilehverdi =

Bilehverdi (Persian: بيلهوردي) may refer to:

- Bilehverdi, East Azerbaijan
- Bilehverdi, West Azerbaijan
