= Kam-e Sefid-e Sofla =

Kam-e Sefid-e Sofla كم سفيدسفلي
- Village
- Location within Iran
- Coordinates: 30°28′42″N 55°08′29″E
- Country: Iran
- Province: Kerman
- County: Shahr-e Babak
- Bakhsh: Dehaj
- Rural District: Jowzam

Population (2006)
  - Total: 148
- Time zone: UTC+3:30 (IRST)
  - Summer (DST): UTC+4:30 (IRDT)

Kam-e Sefid-e Sofla (Persian: كم سفيدسفلي, also Romanized as Kam-e Sefīd-e Soflá; also known as Kamsefīd) is a village in Jowzam Rural District, Dehaj District, Shahr-e Babak County, Kerman Province, Iran. At the 2006 census, its population was 148, in 43 families.
