= Qaragüney =

Garaguney or Karaguney may refer to:

- Qaragüney, Kalbajar, Azerbaijan
- Qaragüney, Sabirabad, Azerbaijan
- Karaguney, Iran
- Karagüney, Iğdır, Turkey
