= Shahinu =

Shahinu شاهينو
- Village
- Location within Iran
- Coordinates: 30°33′36″N 54°40′21″E
- Country: Iran
- Province: Kerman
- County: Shahr-e Babak
- Bakhsh: Dehaj
- Rural District: Khabar

Population (2006)
  - Total: 23
- Time zone: UTC+3:30 (IRST)
  - Summer (DST): UTC+4:30 (IRDT)

Shahinu (Persian: شاهينو, also Romanized as Shāhīnū; also known as Shīnū) is a village in Khabar Rural District, Dehaj District, Shahr-e Babak County, Kerman Province, Iran. At the 2006 census, its population was 23, in 4 families.
