= Bashak =

Bashak باشك
- Village
- Location within Iran
- Coordinates: 30°31′14″N 54°41′20″E
- Country: Iran
- Province: Kerman
- County: Shahr-e Babak
- Bakhsh: Dehaj
- Rural District: Khabar

Population (2006)
  - Total: 15
- Time zone: UTC+3:30 (IRST)
  - Summer (DST): UTC+4:30 (IRDT)

Bashak (Persian: باشك, also Romanized as Bāshak; also known as Bāshtak) is a village in Khabar Rural District, Dehaj District, Shahr-e Babak County, Kerman Province, Iran. At the 2006 census, its population was 15, in 5 families.
