= Behnua-ye Bala =

Behnua-ye Bala بهنوابالا
- Village
- Location within Iran
- Coordinates: 30°28′00″N 55°04′00″E
- Country: Iran
- Province: Kerman
- County: Shahr-e Babak
- Bakhsh: Dehaj
- Rural District: Jowzam

Population (2006)
  - Total: 67
- Time zone: UTC+3:30 (IRST)
  - Summer (DST): UTC+4:30 (IRDT)

Behnua-ye Bala (Persian: بهنوابالا, also Romanized as Behnūā-e Bālā) is a village in Jowzam Rural District, Dehaj District, Shahr-e Babak County, Kerman Province, Iran. At the 2006 census, its population was 67, in 16 families.
