= Mowr-e Gur =

Mowr-e Gur مورگور
- Village
- Location within Iran
- Coordinates: 30°27′58″N 55°11′03″E
- Country: Iran
- Province: Kerman
- County: Shahr-e Babak
- Bakhsh: Dehaj
- Rural District: Jowzam

Population (2006)
  - Total: 23
- Time zone: UTC+3:30 (IRST)
  - Summer (DST): UTC+4:30 (IRDT)

Mowr-e Gur (Persian: مورگور, also romanized as Mowr-e Gūr; also known as Mūr-e Kūr) is a village in Jowzam Rural District, Dehaj District, Shahr-e Babak County, Kerman Province, Iran. At the 2006 census, its population was 23, in 5 families.
