= Aqa Alilu =

Aqa Alilu اقاعلي لو
- Village
- Location within Iran
- Coordinates: 38°19′49″N 46°49′48″E
- Country: Iran
- Province: East Azerbaijan
- County: Heris
- Bakhsh: Khvajeh
- Rural District: Bedevostan-e Gharbi

Population (2006)
  - Total: 186
- Time zone: UTC+3:30 (IRST)
  - Summer (DST): UTC+4:30 (IRDT)

Aqa Alilu (Persian: اقاعلي لو, also Romanized as Āqā ‘Alīlū; also known as Agal, Agally, Āghālī, and Aglu) is a village in Bedevostan-e Gharbi Rural District, Khvajeh District, Heris County, East Azerbaijan Province, Iran. At the 2006 census, its population was 186, in 35 families.
