= Kajuiyeh =

Kajuiyeh كجوييه
- Village
- Location within Iran
- Coordinates: 30°38′26″N 54°54′28″E
- Country: Iran
- Province: Kerman
- County: Shahr-e Babak
- Bakhsh: Dehaj
- Rural District: Dehaj

Population (2006)
  - Total: 266
- Time zone: UTC+3:30 (IRST)
  - Summer (DST): UTC+4:30 (IRDT)

Kajuiyeh (Persian: كجوييه, also Romanized as Kajūīyeh; also known as Kowjū’īyeh) is a village in Dehaj Rural District, Dehaj District, Shahr-e Babak County, Kerman Province, Iran. At the 2006 census, its population was 266, in 59 families.
