= Mavazekhan =

Mavazekhan (Persian: مواضع خان) may refer to:

- Mavazekhan-e Sharqi Rural District
- Mavazekhan-e Shomali Rural District
