= Sarand, East Azerbaijan =

Village in East Azerbaijan province, Iran

Sarand Persian: سرند
- Village
- Location within Iran
- Coordinates: 38°18′18″N 46°36′32″E
- Country: Iran
- Province: East Azerbaijan
- County: Heris
- District: Khvajeh
- Rural District: Mavazekhan-e Shomali

Population (2016)
  - Total: 467
- Time zone: UTC+3:30 (IRST)

Sarand (Persian: سرند) is a village in, and the capital of, Mavazekhan-e Shomali Rural District in Khvajeh District of Heris County, East Azerbaijan province, Iran.

== Demographics ==
=== Population ===
At the time of the 2006 National Census, the village's population was 448 in 115 households. The following census in 2011 counted 354 people in 110 households. The 2016 census measured the population of the village as 467 people in 144 households.
