= Qalehlar, East Azerbaijan =

Qalehlar قلعه لر
- Village
- Location within Iran
- Coordinates: 38°13′02″N 46°32′28″E
- Country: Iran
- Province: East Azerbaijan
- County: Heris
- Bakhsh: Khvajeh
- Rural District: Mavazekhan-e Sharqi

Population (2006)
  - Total: 158
- Time zone: UTC+3:30 (IRST)
  - Summer (DST): UTC+4:30 (IRDT)

Qalehlar (Persian: قلعه لر, also Romanized as Qal‘ehlar; also known as Ghal’eh Lar and Kalalar) is a village in Mavazekhan-e Sharqi Rural District, Khvajeh District, Heris County, East Azerbaijan Province, Iran. At the 2006 census, its population was 158, in 40 families.
