= Gildir =

Village in East Azerbaijan province, Iran

Gildir Persian: گيلدير
- Village
- Location within Iran
- Coordinates: 38°15′22″N 46°54′52″E
- Country: Iran
- Province: East Azerbaijan
- County: Heris
- District: Khvajeh
- Rural District: Bedevostan-e Gharbi

Population (2016)
  - Total: 974
- Time zone: UTC+3:30 (IRST)

Gildir (Persian: گيلدير) (Note: Also romanized as Gīldīr; also known as Gelder, Gīlder, Gil’dyr, Goldar Badostan, and Qīlder) is a village in Bedevostan-e Gharbi Rural District of Khvajeh District in Heris County, East Azerbaijan province, Iran.

== Demographics ==
=== Population ===
At the time of the 2006 National Census, the village's population was 809 in 187 households. The following census in 2011 counted 928 people in 238 households. The 2016 census measured the population of the village as 974 people in 265 households.
