= Jiga =

Jiga may refer to:

- a member of Analog Pussy
- Jiga, Iran
