= Nazuiyeh =

Nazuiyeh نازوييه
- Village
- Location within Iran
- Coordinates: 30°34′42″N 54°44′19″E
- Country: Iran
- Province: Kerman
- County: Shahr-e Babak
- Bakhsh: Dehaj
- Rural District: Khabar

Population (2006)
  - Total: 40
- Time zone: UTC+3:30 (IRST)
  - Summer (DST): UTC+4:30 (IRDT)

Nazuiyeh (Persian: نازوييه, also Romanized as Nāzū’īyeh; also known as Nārzū’īyeh) is a village in Khabar Rural District, Dehaj District, Shahr-e Babak County, Kerman Province, Iran. At the 2006 census, its population was 40, in 10 families.
