= Bagh-e Zardalu =

Bagh-e Zardalu باغ زردالو
- Village
- Country: Iran
- Province: Kerman
- County: Shahr-e Babak
- Bakhsh: Dehaj
- Rural District: Khabar

Population (2006)
  - Total: 98
- Time zone: UTC+3:30 (IRST)
  - Summer (DST): UTC+4:30 (IRDT)

Bagh-e Zardalu (Persian: باغ زردالو, also Romanized as Bāgh-e Zardālū) is a village in Khabar Rural District, Dehaj District, Shahr-e Babak County, Kerman Province, Iran. At the 2006 census, its population was 98, in 21 families.
