= Estiar =

Estiar or Astiar or Asteyar (Persian: استيار), also rendered as Istiar, may refer to:

- Estiar, Heris
- Estiar, Tabriz
