= Deh-e Pain, Shahr-e Babak =

Village in Kerman province, Iran

Deh-e Pain Persian: ده پايين
- Village
- Location within Iran
- Coordinates: 30°31′37″N 54°44′29″E
- Country: Iran
- Province: Kerman
- County: Shahr-e Babak
- District: Dehaj
- Rural District: Khabar

Population (2016)
  - Total: 804
- Time zone: UTC+3:30 (IRST)

Deh-e Pain (Persian: ده پايين) (Note: Also romanized as Deh-e Pā’īn) is a village in Khabar Rural District of Dehaj District, Shahr-e Babak County, Kerman province, Iran.

== Demographics ==
=== Population ===
At the time of the 2006 National Census, the village's population was 474 in 96 households. The following census in 2011 counted 617 people in 160 households. The 2016 census measured the population of the village as 804 people in 216 households. It was the most populous village in its rural district.
