= Bilverdi =

Village in East Azerbaijan province, Iran

Bilverdi Persian: بيلوردي
- Village
- Location within Iran
- Coordinates: 38°15′35″N 46°52′06″E
- Country: Iran
- Province: East Azerbaijan
- County: Heris
- District: Khvajeh
- Rural District: Bedevostan-e Gharbi

Population (2016)
  - Total: 1,215
- Time zone: UTC+3:30 (IRST)

Bilverdi (Persian: بيلوردي) (Note: Also romanized as Bīlverdī; also known as Beloo Yerdi, Belvīrdī, Bilberdi, Bīlehverdī, Bil’verdy, and Bīlvīrdī) is a village in, and the capital of, Bedevostan-e Gharbi Rural District in Khvajeh District of Heris County, East Azerbaijan province, Iran.

== Demographics ==
=== Population ===
At the time of the 2006 National Census, the village's population was 1,147 in 288 households. The following census in 2011 counted 1,281 people in 335 households. The 2016 census measured the population of the village as 1,215 people in 356 households.
