= Rugushuiyeh-ye Olya =

Rugushuiyeh-ye Olya روگوشوئيه عليا
- Village
- Location within Iran
- Coordinates: 30°28′45″N 55°10′29″E
- Country: Iran
- Province: Kerman
- County: Shahr-e Babak
- Bakhsh: Dehaj
- Rural District: Jowzam

Population (2006)
  - Total: 71
- Time zone: UTC+3:30 (IRST)
  - Summer (DST): UTC+4:30 (IRDT)

Rugushuiyeh-ye Olya (Persian: روگوشوئيه عليا, also Romanized as Rūgūshū’īyeh-ye ‘Olyā; also known as Rogūshū’īyeh-ye Bālā, Rūgoshū’īyeh-ye ‘Olyā, Rūgūshū’īyeh Bālā, and Rūgūshū’īyeh-ye Bālā) is a village in Jowzam Rural District, Dehaj District, Shahr-e Babak County, Kerman Province, Iran. At the 2006 census, its population was 71, in 26 families.
