= Khademiyeh =

Village in Kerman province, Iran

Khademiyeh Persian: خادميه
- Village
- Country: Iran
- Province: Kerman
- County: Shahr-e Babak
- District: Dehaj
- Rural District: Dehaj

Population (2016)
  - Total: 219
- Time zone: UTC+3:30 (IRST)

Khademiyeh (Persian: خادميه) (Note: Also romanized as Khādemīyeh; also known as Khān Nesā (خان نسا)) is a village in Dehaj Rural District of Dehaj District, Shahr-e Babak County, Kerman province, Iran.

== Demographics ==
=== Population ===
At the time of the 2006 National Census, the village's population was 13 in 4 households. The following census in 2011 counted 69 people in 22 households. The 2016 census measured the population of the village as 219 people in 61 households. It was the most populous village in its rural district.
