= Latala, Iran =

Latala لاطلا
- Village
- Location within Iran
- Coordinates: 30°26′46″N 55°10′31″E
- Country: Iran
- Province: Kerman
- County: Shahr-e Babak
- Bakhsh: Dehaj
- Rural District: Jowzam

Population (2006)
  - Total: 33
- Time zone: UTC+3:30 (IRST)
  - Summer (DST): UTC+4:30 (IRDT)

Latala (Persian: لاطلا, also Romanized as Lāṭalā) is a village in Jowzam Rural District, Dehaj District, Shahr-e Babak County, Kerman Province, Iran. At the 2006 census, its population was 33, in 13 families.
