= Shabanluy =

Shabanluy (Persian: شعبان لوي) may refer to:

- Shabanluy-e Olya
- Shabanluy-e Sofla
