= Shabrak =

Shabrak may refer to:

- Ahmadabad-e Shahrak
- Shahrak-e Pain
