= Torsh Kuh, Kerman =

Torsh Kuh ترشكوه
- Village
- Location within Iran
- Coordinates: 30°26′02″N 55°14′28″E
- Country: Iran
- Province: Kerman
- County: Shahr-e Babak
- Bakhsh: Dehaj
- Rural District: Jowzam

Population (2006)
  - Total: 42
- Time zone: UTC+3:30 (IRST)
  - Summer (DST): UTC+4:30 (IRDT)

Torsh Kuh (Persian: ترشكوه, also Romanized as Torsh Kūh) is a village in Jowzam Rural District, Dehaj District, Shahr-e Babak County, Kerman Province, Iran. At the 2006 census, its population was 42, in 10 families.
