= Deh-e Shaduiyeh =

Village in Kerman province, Iran

Deh-e Shaduiyeh Persian: دهشادوييه
- Village
- Location within Iran
- Coordinates: 30°29′32″N 55°03′11″E
- Country: Iran
- Province: Kerman
- County: Shahr-e Babak
- District: Dehaj
- Rural District: Jowzam

Population (2016)
  - Total: 460
- Time zone: UTC+3:30 (IRST)

Deh-e Shaduiyeh (Persian: دهشادوييه) (Note: Also romanized as Deh-e Shādū’īyeh) is a village in Jowzam Rural District of Dehaj District, Shahr-e Babak County, Kerman province, Iran.

== Demographics ==
=== Population ===
At the time of the 2006 National Census, the village's population was 397 in 112 households. The following census in 2011 counted 510 people in 164 households. The 2016 census measured the population of the village as 460 people in 164 households. It was the most populous village in its rural district.
