= Janqur, Heris =

Village in East Azerbaijan province, Iran

Janqur Persian: جانقور
- Village
- Location within Iran
- Coordinates: 38°08′56″N 46°54′05″E
- Country: Iran
- Province: East Azerbaijan
- County: Heris
- District: Khvajeh
- Rural District: Bedevostan-e Gharbi

Population (2016)
  - Total: 2,221
- Time zone: UTC+3:30 (IRST)

Janqur (Persian: جانقور) (Note: Also romanized as Jānqūr; also known as Dzhangur and Jangur) is a village in Bedevostan-e Gharbi Rural District of Khvajeh District in Heris County, East Azerbaijan province, Iran.

== Demographics ==
=== Population ===
At the time of the 2006 National Census, the village's population was 1,940 in 492 households. The following census in 2011 counted 2,129 people in 598 households. The 2016 census measured the population of the village as 2,221 people in 631 households.
