= Omidcheh =

Omidcheh (Persian: اميدچه) may refer to:

- Omidcheh, Ardabil
- Omidcheh, Meshgin Shahr, Ardabil Province
- Omidcheh, East Azerbaijan
