= Agal =

Agal or AGAL may refer to:

- Agal (accessory), an Arab men's clothing accessory
- Agal, Iran, a village in East Azerbaijan Province, Iran
- Adobe Graphics Assembly Language, a programming language for GPU shaders in Adobe Flash
- Galician Language Association (Galician: Associaçom Galega da Língua, AGAL), a Galician linguistic association founded in 1981
- AG.AL International, an alternate name for the esports organization All Gamers
