= Khabar Rural District =

Khabar Rural District (Persian: دهستان خبر) may refer to:

- Khabar Rural District (Baft County)
- Khabar Rural District (Shahr-e Babak County)
