= Qalehlar =

Qalehlar or Qaleh Lar (Persian: قلعه لر) may refer to:

- Qalehlar, East Azerbaijan
- Qaleh Lar, West Azerbaijan
