= Taraf, Iran =

Taraf طرف
- Village
- Location within Iran
- Coordinates: 38°19′52″N 46°54′24″E
- Country: Iran
- Province: East Azerbaijan
- County: Heris
- Bakhsh: Khvajeh
- Rural District: Bedevostan-e Gharbi

Population (2006)
  - Total: 227
- Time zone: UTC+3:30 (IRST)
  - Summer (DST): UTC+4:30 (IRDT)

Taraf (Persian: طرف, also Romanized as Ţaraf; also known as Tarp) is a village in Bedevostan-e Gharbi Rural District, Khvajeh District, Heris County, East Azerbaijan Province, Iran. At the 2006 census, its population was 227, in 51 families.
