= Kahlik Bolaghi =

Kahlik Bolaghi (Persian: كهليك بلاغي) may refer to two villages in Iran:

- Kahlik Bolaghi, Ardabil
- Kahlik Bolaghi, East Azerbaijan
