= Abd al-Jabbar (disambiguation) =

Abd al-Jabbar is a masculine Arabic name used by Muslims.

Abd al-Jabbar may also refer to:

- Sidi Abdeldjebar, Algeria
- Abd ol-Jabbar, East Azerbaijan Province, Iran
