= Zaruiyeh-ye Sofla =

Zaruiyeh-ye Sofla زاروييه سفلي
- Village
- Location within Iran
- Coordinates: 30°26′53″N 54°58′42″E
- Country: Iran
- Province: Kerman
- County: Shahr-e Babak
- Bakhsh: Dehaj
- Rural District: Jowzam

Population (2006)
  - Total: 76
- Time zone: UTC+3:30 (IRST)
  - Summer (DST): UTC+4:30 (IRDT)

Zaruiyeh-ye Sofla (Persian: زاروييه سفلي, also Romanized as Zārū’īyeh-ye Soflá; also known as Zārū’īyeh and Zārū’īyeh-ye Pā’īn) is a village in Jowzam Rural District, Dehaj District, Shahr-e Babak County, Kerman Province, Iran. At the 2006 census, its population was 76, in 15 families.
