= Janqur =

Janqur (Persian: جانقور) may refer to:

- Janqur, Heris
- Janqur, Tabriz
