= UK underground (disambiguation) =

UK Underground may refer to:

- London Underground, the primary metro system in the UK
- UK underground, a 1960s counterculture movement in the UK
- UK underground hip-hop, a 1980s British underground hip-hop scene influenced by UK jazz, electro, and conscious rap
- UK underground rap, a 2020s underground hip-hop scene influenced by cloud rap, rage, and jerk
- Mail Rail, a former underground postal railway in London

== See also ==
- Transport in the United Kingdom
- List of metro systems
- Underground (disambiguation)
