= Jiqeh =

Village in East Azerbaijan province, Iran

Jiqeh Persian: جيقه
- Village
- Location within Iran
- Coordinates: 38°18′57″N 46°45′31″E
- Country: Iran
- Province: East Azerbaijan
- County: Heris
- District: Khvajeh
- Rural District: Bedevostan-e Gharbi

Population (2016)
  - Total: 909
- Time zone: UTC+3:30 (IRST)

Jiqeh (Persian: جيقه) (Note: Also romanized as Jīqeh; also known as Dzhiga, Jegheh, Jeqeh (جقه), Jeqqeh, Jiga, and Jīgheh) is a village in Bedevostan-e Gharbi Rural District of Khvajeh District in Heris County, East Azerbaijan province, Iran.

== Demographics ==
=== Population ===
At the time of the 2006 National Census, the village's population was 1,156 in 244 households. The following census in 2011 counted 1,084 people in 280 households. The 2016 census measured the population of the village as 909 people in 263 households.
