= Gugarchin =

Gugarchin (Persian: گوگرچين) may refer to:

- Gugarchin, Ardabil
- Gugarchin, East Azerbaijan
