= Quyujaq =

Quyujaq (Persian: قويوجاق), also rendered as Quyjaq, may refer to:

- Quyujaq, Heris
- Quyujaq, Meyaneh
