= Zaruiyeh-ye Olya =

Zaruiyeh-ye Olya زاروييه عليا
- Village
- Location within Iran
- Coordinates: 30°27′42″N 54°58′02″E
- Country: Iran
- Province: Kerman
- County: Shahr-e Babak
- Bakhsh: Dehaj
- Rural District: Jowzam

Population (2006)
  - Total: 39
- Time zone: UTC+3:30 (IRST)
  - Summer (DST): UTC+4:30 (IRDT)

Zaruiyeh-ye Olya (Persian: زاروييه عليا, also Romanized as Zārū'īyeh-ye 'Olyā; also known as Zārū'īyeh-ye Bālā) is a village in Jowzam Rural District, Dehaj District, Shahr-e Babak County, Kerman Province, Iran. At the 2006 census, its population was 39, in 11 families.
