= Di Baglu =

Village in East Azerbaijan province, Iran

Di Baglu Persian: ديبگلو
- Village
- Location within Iran
- Coordinates: 38°23′16″N 46°36′20″E
- Country: Iran
- Province: East Azerbaijan
- County: Heris
- District: Khvajeh
- Rural District: Mavazekhan-e Shomali

Population (2016)
  - Total: 276
- Time zone: UTC+3:30 (IRST)

Di Baglu (Persian: ديبگلو) (Note: Also romanized as Dī Baglū; also known as Dabakloo, Debaglū, Debaklū, Debīglū, Dībaklū, Dībeklū, Ţebāqlī, and Tibagli) is a village in Mavazekhan-e Shomali Rural District of Khvajeh District in Heris County, East Azerbaijan province, Iran.

== Demographics ==
=== Population ===
At the time of the 2006 National Census, the village's population was 193 in 35 households. The following census in 2011 counted 161 people in 44 households. The 2016 census measured the population of the village as 276 people in 89 households.
