= Rugushuiyeh-ye Sofla =

Village in Kerman, Iran

Rugushuiyeh-ye Sofla روگوشوئيه سفلي
- Village
- Location within Iran
- Coordinates: 30°29′04″N 55°10′01″E
- Country: Iran
- Province: Kerman
- County: Shahr-e Babak
- Bakhsh: Dehaj
- Rural District: Jowzam

Population (2006)
  - Total: 43
- Time zone: UTC+3:30 (IRST)
  - Summer (DST): UTC+4:30 (IRDT)

Rugushuiyeh-ye Sofla (Persian: روگوشوئيه سفلي, also Romanized as Rūgūshū’īyeh-ye Soflā; also known as Rogūshū’īyeh-ye Pā’īn, Rūgoshū’īyeh-ye Soflā, Rūgūshū’īyeh Pā’īn, and Rūgūshū’īyeh-ye Pā’īn) is a village in Jowzam Rural District, Dehaj District, Shahr-e Babak County, Kerman Province, Iran. At the 2006 census, its population was 43, in 15 families.
