= Tarfeh =

Tarfeh طرفه
- Village
- Location within Iran
- Coordinates: 30°30′29″N 55°04′06″E
- Country: Iran
- Province: Kerman
- County: Shahr-e Babak
- Bakhsh: Dehaj
- Rural District: Jowzam

Population (2006)
  - Total: 25
- Time zone: UTC+3:30 (IRST)
  - Summer (DST): UTC+4:30 (IRDT)

Tarfeh (Persian: طرفه, also Romanized as Ţarfeh; also known as Ţaraf) is a village in Jowzam Rural District, Dehaj District, Shahr-e Babak County, Kerman Province, Iran. At the 2006 census, its population was 25, in seven families.
