= Latala =

Latala may refer to:

- Latala, Iran, a village in Dehaj District, Kerman Province, Iran
- Latala (Ludhiana West), a village located in Ludhiana district, Punjab, India
