= Khabar, Shahr-e Babak =

Village in Kerman province, Iran

Khabar Persian: خبر
- Village
- Location within Iran
- Coordinates: 30°32′45″N 54°42′20″E
- Country: Iran
- Province: Kerman
- County: Shahr-e Babak
- District: Dehaj
- Rural District: Khabar

Population (2016)
  - Total: 791
- Time zone: UTC+3:30 (IRST)

Khabar (Persian: خبر) (Note: Also romanized as Khabr and Khebr; also known as Khebreh and Khowr) is a village in, and the capital of, Khabar Rural District of Dehaj District, Shahr-e Babak County, Kerman province, Iran.

== Demographics ==
=== Population ===
At the time of the 2006 National Census, the village's population was 263 in 60 households. The following census in 2011 counted 711 people in 208 households. The 2016 census measured the population of the village as 791 people in 275 households.
