= The Underground (Boston) =

Music club in Boston, Massachusetts

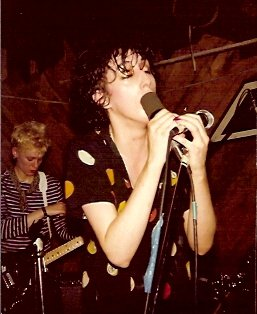
- Cynthia Sley (front) and Pat Place of Bush Tetras at The Underground, 1981
- Interactive map of The Underground
- Location: 1110 Commonwealth Avenue, Boston (Allston), Massachusetts 42°21′5.31″N 71°7′29.47″W
- Type: Music venue
- Events: Post-punk, punk rock, alternative rock, garage rock, rock and roll, new wave

Construction
- Opened: February 16, 1980
- Closed: June 14, 1981

The Underground was a music club located in the Allston neighborhood of Boston that featured local, national and international acts performing independent and post-punk music. Although the emerging acts who played there included Mission of Burma, The Cure and New Order, its lifespan was short, from February 1980 until June 1981.

Jim Coffman, a Boston University sophomore who was waiting tables at the nearby restaurant Our House, started the club after convincing the same owners of the pub Sweet Virginia's (whose boss was the infamous Boston club owner Henry Vara) to turn over the dying business at 1110 Commonwealth Avenue, an L-shaped wood-paneled venue (one-time home of music club Brandy's II.)

As Doug Simmons wrote in his 1981 Boston Phoenix postmortem for the club, The Underground's opening launched "the city's most far-ranging search for underground talent," adding that "never had so many bands traveled so far to play in front of so few for so little." As but one memorable example, The Cure performed their first time in Boston at the venue, playing virtually the entire Boys Don't Cry album before little more than a hundred people the night of Robert Smith's 21st birthday which MIT film and video student Jan Crocker recorded along with warmup Mission of Burma.

"The effect on the local Boston scene was even more dramatic," Simmons also wrote. The Underground provided support for a mix of Boston bands: among others, the teen rock of Boys Life and The Outlets, the punk-funk of the Suade Cowboys and Prince Charles and the City Beat Band, the new wave of Peter Dayton and The Neats and, most of all, the art-rock of Mission of Burma (whom Coffman would later manage), the all female group Bound and Gagged, and Someone and the Somebodies.

In addition to nurturing homegrown talent, honed by the soundwork of Michael Whittaker, who later worked for many of the clubs headliners like Bush Tetras, Raybeats, and later toured with The Raincoats, Fad Gadget, Wah and others, the Underground booked many bands from across the U.S. and abroad. Whittaker later moved to Los Angeles and under the 'non-de-plume' "Spaceman" worked at SST, furthering the sounds of Black Flag, Sonic Youth, Dinosaur Jr., Slovenly and many others. Besides The Cure and New Order making their Boston debuts there, other out-of-towners headlining the club included such American indie acts as The Bongos, Lydia Lunch and 8-Eyed Spy, Shrapnel, Bush Tetras, Los Microwaves, The dB's, The Suburbs and Pylon. Brian Brain, Delta 5, Bauhaus, Au Pairs, Blurt, A Certain Ratio and Orchestral Manoeuvres in the Dark were among the British acts to play there, as did Canada's DOA and Northern Ireland's Protex.

Although accounts vary on the specific reasons for the club's demise, all cite ongoing tension between the club, whose lease had an option through 1990, and Boston University, which had purchased the building housing The Underground shortly before it opened and turned the above-ground floors into a dormitory. Landlord-tenant squabbles ensued, leaving CCCPTV, People in Stores, The Dark and headliners The Neats to play The Underground's final night on June 14, 1981. The crowd in attendance pulled down the drop ceiling, punched through walls and flooded the bathrooms. Dormitory students flooded through the shared entrance and confronted the club goers with some students dropping bottles from their dorm rooms. Members of the rock band "Jomo Birds" were seen cowering behind their amplifiers in the ensuing mayhem.

== Notables ==
- Au Pairs
- Bauhaus
- Blurt
- Bush Tetras
- A Certain Ratio
- The Cure
- Delta 5
- DOA
- Human Switchboard
- Lydia Lunch and 8-Eyed Spy
- Lyres
- The Method Actors
- Mission of Burma
- R. Stevie Moore
- The Neats
- New Order
- Orchestral Manoeuvres in the Dark
- The Outlets
- People in Stores
- Polyrock
- Pylon
- The Raybeats
- The Suburbs
- The Vacuum Heads
- The Young Snakes
