= Jowzam =

City in Kerman province, Iran

Jowzam Persian: جوزم
- City
- Location within Iran
- Coordinates: 30°30′36″N 55°01′48″E
- Country: Iran
- Province: Kerman
- County: Shahr-e Babak
- District: Dehaj

Population (2016)
  - Total: 3,436
- Time zone: UTC+3:30 (IRST)

Jowzam (Persian: جوزم) is a city in Dehaj District of Shahr-e Babak County, Kerman province, Iran, serving as the administrative center for Jowzam Rural District.

== Demographics ==
=== Population ===
At the time of the 2006 National Census, Jowzam's population was 7,949 in 1,495 households, when it was a village in Jowzam Rural District. The following census in 2011 counted 4,929 people in 1,169 households, by which time the village had been elevated to the status of a city. The 2016 census measured the population of the city as 3,436 people in 994 households.
