= Sense and Sensuality =

Studio album by Au Pairs
- Released: June 1982
- Genre: Post-punk
- Label: Kamera Records
- Producer: Au Pairs

Au Pairs chronology
Playing with a Different Sex (1981)	Sense and Sensuality (1982)

Professional ratings
Review scores
Source	Rating
Allmusic	4/5 stars
Christgau's Record Guide	C
Smash Hits	9/10
Tom Hull – on the Web	B

Sense and Sensuality (1982) is the second and last album by British post-punk band Au Pairs. The album reached No. 79 in Britain. No singles were released from the album. The album cover wasn't approved by the band. The lyrics focus on personal and wider political issues, but show a greater range of musical influences, than their first album Playing with a Different Sex.

== Track listing ==
All tracks composed by Lesley Woods, Paul Foad, Jane Munro and Peter Hammond.

1. "Don't Lie Back"
2. "(That's When) It's Worth It"
3. "Instant Touch"
4. "Sex Without Stress"
5. "Fiasco"
6. "Intact"
7. "Tongue in Cheek"
8. "Stepping Out of Line"
9. "Shakedown"
10. "America"

== Personnel ==
=== Band ===
- Lesley Woods – guitar, vocals
- Paul Foad – guitar, cello, vocals
- Jane Munro – bass
- Peter Hammond – drums, percussion

=== Additional musicians ===
- Chris Lee – trumpet
- James Johnstone & Olly Moore – saxophones
- Keith Knowles & John Suddick – synthesizers
- Milt Hampton – vibraphone

=== Production ===
- Au Pairs – producer
- Terry Barham – engineer
- Ken Thomas – engineer

== Charts ==
Chart (1982)	Peak position
UK Albums (OCC)	79
Dutch Albums (Album Top 100)	49
Swedish Albums (Sverigetopplistan)	30

== External links and sources ==
- Au Pairs at AllMusic
