= Underground 2 =

Underground 2 may refer to:

- Need for Speed: Underground 2, a 2004 racing video game
- Tony Hawk's Underground 2, a 2004 skateboarding video game
- LP Underground 2.0, a 2002 CD and digital download set by Linkin Park Underground
- Underground Vol. 2: Club Memphis, a compilation album by Three 6 Mafia

== See also ==
- Underground (disambiguation)
