= Arbatan, Heris =

City in East Azerbaijan province, Iran

Arbatan Persian: اربطان
- City
- Location within Iran
- Coordinates: 38°10′27″N 46°56′16″E
- Country: Iran
- Province: East Azerbaijan
- County: Heris
- District: Khvajeh
- Established as a city: 2019

Population (2016)
  - Total: 3,233
- Time zone: UTC+3:30 (IRST)

Arbatan (Persian: اربطان) (Note: Also romanized as Arabatan and Arbaţān) is a city in Khvajeh District of Heris County, East Azerbaijan province, Iran.

== Demographics ==
=== Population ===
At the time of the 2006 National Census, Arbatan's population was 2,824 in 670 households, when it was a village in Bedevostan-e Gharbi Rural District. The following census in 2011 counted 3,167 people in 851 households. The 2016 census measured the population as 3,233 people in 936 households. It was the most populous village in its rural district.

After the census, Arbatan was elevated to the status of a city.
