= Playing with a Different Sex =

1981 studio album by Au Pairs

Studio album by Au Pairs
- Released: May 1981
- Recorded: April 1981
- Studios: Jacobs (Farnham, Surrey, England)
- Genre: Post-punk
- Length: 40:10
- Label: Human
- Producers: Au Pairs; Martin Culverwell; Ken Thomas

Au Pairs chronology
Playing with a Different Sex (1981)	Sense and Sensuality (1982)

Playing with a Different Sex is the debut studio album by English post-punk band Au Pairs, released in May 1981 by Human Records.

The album peaked at number 33 in Britain and produced the single "It's Obvious", which reached number 37 on the Club Play Singles chart in America in 1981. Although the record was not a great commercial success on its initial release, it has since received critical acclaim and is viewed as an influence on later female-fronted bands.

== Themes ==
Many of the songs on the album deal with sexual politics. In "Repetition", a David Bowie cover, domestic violence is explored ("I guess the bruises won't show/If she wears long sleeves"), and the possessiveness underlying an open relationship is pilloried in "We're So Cool" ("you must admit/I'm prepared to share/At off-peak times"). "It's Obvious" has been described as a fantasy "about a time when gender roles ceased to matter".

"Headache for Michelle", is about being too high to object to problems in society, and was inspired by Woods’ first girlfriend. Though Woods identifies as bisexual, at the time she felt it was easier to tell journalists that she was a lesbian, though it risked harming her career.

Allegations of rape and torture of Irish women imprisoned in the city of Armagh in Northern Ireland are the core content of the song "Armagh", which challenges the notion that "civilised nations" do not torture. The refrain, "We don't torture, we're a civilized nation / We're avoiding any confrontation / We don't torture..." is repeated throughout the song. The lyrics point out that the "American hostages in Iran, [are] heard daily on the news..." while "You can ignore the 32." They continue: "There are 32 women in Armagh jail / Political prisoners here at home," before describing alleged incidents of abuse. The song led to limited distribution of the album in Ireland, when Northern Irish record distributors refused to carry it.

The song "Come Again" refers to the social pressure to "achieve orgasmic equality"; a 1982 profile in Mother Jones notes that the song depicts sex "as a dreary ritual in which partners as joyless as lab rats press bars and nose buttons in the hopes of an orgasm as dry and quantifiable as kibble." The song, directed at "those who changed the game" and "brought in new rules", asks "is it real? Are you feeling it?", before turning into a dialogue between the female lead singer and male back up who is evidently attempting to satisfy her: "Am I doing it right?" he asks, and the woman reassures him, "You're not selfish/You're trying hard to please me – please, please me/Is your finger aching?/I can feel you hesitating." The song was banned from the BBC, who feared parental backlash.

== Reissue ==
The album was reissued in 1992 on CD by RPM Records, a subsidiary of Cherry Red Records, with an additional eight tracks, consisting of singles, remixes and previously unreleased songs.

== Critical response ==
Professional ratings
Review scores
Source	Rating
AllMusic	4.5/5 stars
Pitchfork	9.3/10
Record Mirror	5/5 stars
The Rolling Stone Album Guide	4/5 stars
The Village Voice	B+

Paul Du Noyer of NME wrote that "it's not a perfect record ... But even the few faults that I'll describe don't alter one fact, namely that Playing with a Different Sex amounts to a well-above-average example of new English rock". For Du Noyer, the two faults with the album were that the music's "tense, abrasive attack" suffered from a lack of variety, and that Woods "has a tendency to overdo the disenchantment ... sarcasm and scorn are wearying eventually". Overall, however, he stated that "Playing with a Different Sex is a fine effort, well worth the required slice of anyone's time and money". Paolo Hewitt of Melody Maker said that "The Au Pairs sound is a hectic, jerking rush, usually dominated by bass and drums", but because of their reliance on this, "their formula tends to be limited" and many of the songs were "unmemorable". He concluded that the album was "a record that undoubtedly contains the seeds for future prosperity, but is too self conscious, too locked up in itself to breathe properly". In Record Mirror, Mark Cooper wrote that the Au Pairs' "critique of all forms of possession and sexual stereotyping assumes a devastating power". Playing with a Different Sex was ranked at number 17 on NME's list of the best albums of 1981.

Later reviews of Playing with a Different Sex have been universally positive. In its retrospective review, AllMusic described the album as "one of the great, and perhaps forgotten, post-punk records". In a 2023 review for Pitchfork, Sophie Kemp called it "an oblique piece of music" and "one of those records that requires you to rewire your brain a little bit. They play with dissonance and repetition, taking one phrase and beating it into the ground until it becomes less of an earworm and more of an absurdist echolalia". Describing the album in The Rough Guide to Rock (2003), Owen James referred to the band's mix of humour and righteous anger, stating "They don't make them like this anymore." In 2002's She's a Rebel: The History of Women in Rock & Roll, Gillian G. Gaar suggested that "the taut rhythms and aggressive lyrics of Different Sex make it a classic example of how the influence of punk could steer rock into exciting new areas." The song "Diet", originally released as a single in 1980 and recorded for a session for BBC Radio 1 in 1981, was later released on Equal but Different (1994), a compilation of twenty of the band's BBC performances, and included on the extended reissue of Playing with a Different Sex; it was described by Fact as a "masterpiece of feminist rock" with an almost unparalleled "power and pathos".

== Track listing ==
All tracks are written by Paul Foad, Peter Hammond, Jane Munro and Lesley Woods, except where noted.

Side one

1. "We're So Cool" – 3:29
2. "Love Song" – 2:51
3. "Set-Up" – 3:21
4. "Repetition" (David Bowie) – 3:34
5. "Headache for Michelle" – 6:39

Side B

1. "Come Again" – 3:54
2. "Armagh" – 3:37
3. "Unfinished Business" – 3:29
4. "Dear John" – 2:57
5. "It's Obvious" – 6:19

=== Reissue bonus tracks ===
1. "You" – 2:52
2. "Domestic Departure" – 2:22
3. "Kerb Crawler" – 2:47
4. "Diet" – 4:19
5. "It's Obvious" (single version) – 5:47
6. "Inconvenience" (12" version) – 2:56
7. "Pretty Boys" – 3:40
8. "Headache for Michelle" (remix) – 6:38

== Personnel ==
Credits are adapted from the album's liner notes.

Au Pairs

- Jane Munro – bass guitar, production
- Lesley Woods – guitar, vocals, production
- Paul Foad – guitar, backing vocals, production
- Peter Hammond – drums, production

Technical

- Eve Arnold – cover photography
- Martin Culverwell – production, sleeve design
- John Dent – mastering
- Rocking Russian – sleeve design
- Ken Thomas – production, engineering

== Charts ==
Chart performance for Playing with a Different Sex
Chart (1981)	Peak position
UK Albums (Official Charts)	33
UK Independent Albums (Record Business)	1
