= Overground =

Overground may refer to:

== Transport ==
- London Overground, a suburban rail network in London since 2007
  - By analogy, a commuter rail network in general
- "Overground" trains, an informal, colloquial term for National Rail services in London, used to distinguish them from London Underground services
- Overground Network, a former temporary brand name for suburban railways in south London, UK, which is now defunct
- Overground (bus company), a former London independent bus operator

== Music ==
- Overground, a 2020s British underground rap scene influenced by cloud rap, rage, and jerk
- Overground (band), a German boy band
- "Overground" (song), a single released by Siouxsie & the Banshees
- "Overground", a song released by Ruslana on her Wild Energy (album)

== See also ==
- Underground (disambiguation)
