= Dehaj =

City in Kerman province, Iran

Dehaj Persian: دهج
- City
- Location within Iran
- Coordinates: 30°41′33″N 54°52′41″E
- Country: Iran
- Province: Kerman
- County: Shahr-e Babak
- District: Dehaj

Population (2016)
  - Total: 5,045
- Time zone: UTC+3:30 (IRST)

Dehaj (Persian: دهج) (Note: Also romanized as Dahaj; also known as Dehīj) is a city in, and the capital of, Dehaj District of Shahr-e Babak County, Kerman province, Iran. It also serves as the administrative center for Dehaj Rural District. Ayyoub's (Job's) Cave is located near Dehaj.

== Demographics ==
=== Population ===
At the time of the 2006 National Census, the city's population was 7,756 in 1,600 households. The following census in 2011 counted 3,366 people in 987 households. The 2016 census measured the population of the city as 5,045 people in 1,621 households.
