= Stepping Out of Line: The Anthology =

Compilation album by Au Pairs
- Released: 6 June 2006
- Genre: rock, post-punk
- Label: Castle

Au Pairs chronology
| Shocks to the System: Very Best of the Au Pairs (1999) | Stepping Out of Line: The Anthology (2006) |

Stepping Out of Line: The Anthology is a 2006 compilation CD containing every available track recorded by the brief-lived 1980s British post-punk band Au Pairs, described by AllMusic's reviewer as "one of the smartest, sharpest bands of the post-punk era."

== Themes ==
The Au Pairs were frequently jarring and dissonant, closely related musically and thematically to other post-punk bands like Mekons or the Gang of Four, but the Au Pairs are unusual in the even division of the band between male and female members and their deep exploration of sexual politics. Sexual roles and conflicts are a recurrent theme through the album. Allegations of rape and torture of Irish women imprisoned in the city of Armagh in Northern Ireland are the subject of the song "Armagh." "Diet" is a strident ode to the repetitive role of the housewife. Social pressures on men, too, are examined: "Come Again" refers to the polite requirement for equal orgasm in a modern, civilised couple.

== Reception ==
Professional ratings
Review scores
| Source | Rating |
|---|---|
| Allmusic | 4.5/5 stars |
| Blender Magazine | 3.5/5 stars |
| Stylus Magazine | (A) |

The compilation, like the band, was not universally well received. Though describing its dissonance as "coldly thrill friction," Blender Magazine reviewer Simon Reynolds found the anthology excessive and noted that the "power of dour wears thin," but other reviewers treated the album more generously. Stylus Magazine's Mallory O'Donnell "[s]trongly recommended" the anthology "for all who seek to temper well-grounded ire with emotional fires," and AllMusic's Andy Kellman asserted that "[n]o one could possibly give this band's output too much attention."

== Track listing ==
Unless otherwise noted, all songs composed by Paul Foad, Peter Hammond, Jane Munro and Lesley Woods.

1. "We're So Cool" – 3:28
2. "Love Song" – 2:59
3. "Set-Up" – 3:20
4. "Repetition" (David Bowie) – 3:48
5. "Headache for Michelle" – 6:54
6. "Come Again" – 3:54
7. "Armagh" – 3:37
8. "Unfinished Business" – 3:29
9. "Dear John" – 2:57
10. "It's Obvious" – 6:19
11. "Pretty Boys" – 4:00
12. "Monogamy" – 2:55
13. "Ideal Woman" – 3:55
14. "You" – 2:51
15. "Domestic Departure" – 2:21
16. "Kerb Crawler" – 2:46
17. "Diet" – 4:18
18. "It's Obvious (Single Version)" – 5:45
19. "Inconvenience (12" Version)" – 2:55
20. "Pretty Boys" (Alt) – 3:38
21. "Stepping Out of Line" – 6:02
22. "Sex Without Stress" – 4:31
23. "Instant Touch" – 3:00
24. "That's When It's Worth It" – 4:06
25. "Shakedown" – 4:22
26. "Tongue in Cheek" – 3:01
27. "Intact" – 3:16
28. "Don't Lie Back" – 4:49
29. "America" – 5:20
30. "Fiasco" – 3:51
31. "No More Secret Lives" (demo) – 5:16
32. "Runs with Honey" (demo) – 6:19
33. "Hokka He Ha" (demo) – 5:32
34. "Taking Care of Him" (demo) – 5:12
35. "What Kind of Girl" – 3:36
36. "Piece of My Heart" (live) (Jerry Ragovoy, Bert Berns) – 3:49
37. "Headache for Michelle (Remix)" – 6:38

== Personnel ==
=== Performance ===
- Jane Munro – bass
- Lesley Woods – guitar, vocals
- Paul Foad – guitar, vocals
- Peter Hammond – drums
- Nick O'Connor – keyboards on tracks 31, 32, 33, 34 and bass on 33 & 34
- Jayne Morris – percussion and backing vocals on tracks 31, 32, 33, 34
- Graeme Hamilton – trumpet

=== Production ===
- Anton Corbijn – photography
- Steve Hammonds – project coordinator
- Will Nicol – project coordinator
- Becky Stewart – design
- Kieron Tyler – liner notes
