= Underground culture (disambiguation) =

Underground culture is a term to describe various alternative cultures which either consider themselves different from the mainstream of society and culture, or are considered so by others.

Underground culture may also refer to:

- Underground art, art with a following independent of commercial success
- Underground comix, a small press or self-published alternative comic books
- Underground film, cinema outside the commercial mainstream
- Underground music, music with a following despite moderate commercial success
  - Underground hip hop, a style of hip hop music
  - Underground rock, a radio format of progressive rock
- Underground press, the alternative print media in the late 1960s and early 1970s
- Prague underground (culture), an underground culture movement in Prague, Czechoslovakia
- UK underground, a 1960s countercultural movement in the United Kingdom
- Ukrainian underground, a movement in the Soviet period of Ukraine

== See also ==
- Underground (disambiguation)
