= Khajeh, Iran =

City in East Azerbaijan province, Iran

Khajeh Persian: خواجه
- City
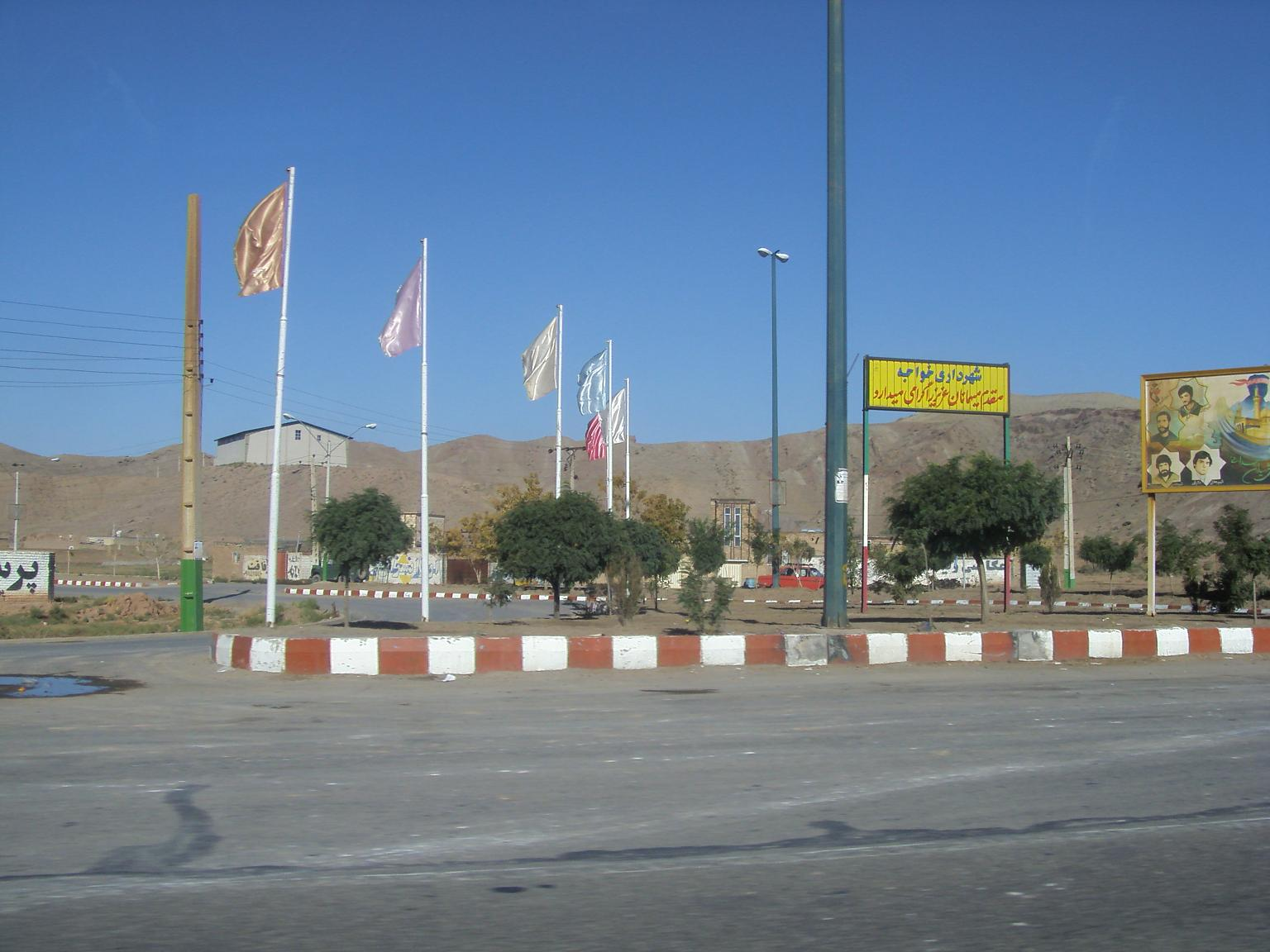
- Landscape in Khajeh, Iran

- Location within Iran
- Coordinates: 38°09′19″N 46°35′09″E
- Country: Iran
- Province: East Azerbaijan
- County: Heris
- District: Khavej
- Established as a city: 1994

Population (2016)
  - Total: 4,011
- Time zone: UTC+3:30 (IRST)

Khajeh (Persian: خواجه) (Note: Also romanized as Khājeh, and Khvājeh; also known as Khadzha and Khwāja) is a city in, and the capital of, Khvajeh District of Heris County, East Azerbaijan province, Iran. It also serves as the administrative center for Mavazekhan-e Sharqi Rural District. The village of Khajeh was converted to a city in 1994.

== Demographics ==
=== Population ===
At the time of the 2006 National Census, the city's population was 3,700 in 981 households. The following census in 2011 counted 3,801 people in 1,154 households. The 2016 census measured the population of the city as 4,011 people in 1,265 households.
