= Qaragüney, Sabirabad =

Garaguney
- Municipality
- Azerbaijani: Qaragüney
- Location within Azerbaijan
- Coordinates: 39°57′36″N 48°50′49″E
- Country: Azerbaijan
- District: Sabirabad

Population
  - Total: 2,532
- Time zone: UTC+4 (AZT)
  - Summer (DST): UTC+5 (AZT)

Qaragüney (Garaguney, previously Qaragünə, Yaxa-Qaragünə) is a village and municipality in the Sabirabad District of Azerbaijan. It has a population of 2,532.
