= Joghanab-e Sofla =

Joghanab-e Sofla جغناب سفلي
- Village
- Location within Iran
- Coordinates: 38°46′47″N 47°06′59″E
- Country: Iran
- Province: East Azerbaijan
- County: Kaleybar
- Bakhsh: Central
- Rural District: Peyghan Chayi

Population (2006)
  - Total: 125
- Time zone: UTC+3:30 (IRST)
  - Summer (DST): UTC+4:30 (IRDT)

Joghanab-e Sofla (Persian: جغناب سفلي, also Romanized as Joghanāb-e Soflá; also known as Jeghanāb Pā’īn and Joghanāb-e Pā’īn) is a village in Peyghan Chayi Rural District, in the Central District of Kaleybar County, East Azerbaijan Province, Iran. At the 2006 census, its population was 125, in 29 families.
