= Au Pairs =

British post-punk band

- The band circa. 1982

Background information
- Origin: Birmingham, England
- Genres: Post-punk
- Years active: 1978–1983, 2025 - present
- Labels: Human; Kamera
- Members: Lesley Woods; Alex Ward; Jem Doulton; Estella Adeyeri
- Past members: Jane Munro; Paul Foad; Pete Hammond; Nick O'Connor; Jayne Morris; Graeme Hamilton; Cara Tivey

The Au Pairs are a British post-punk band that formed in Birmingham in 1978 and continued until 1983 on their first run. The band reformed in 2025, with Lesley Woods as the only original member. They produced two studio albums and three singles. Their songs were said to have "contempt for the cliches of contemporary sexual politics" and their music has been compared to that of the Gang of Four and the Young Marble Giants. The band was fronted by Lesley Woods, who was once described as "one of the most striking women in British rock".

== History ==
=== Formation ===
Au Pairs formed in Birmingham in 1978. The genesis happened after guitarists Lesley Woods and Paul Foad met at a bus stop in Birmingham in 1976. They began dating and set about starting a band, though their relationship came to an end before the first Au Pairs album came out. Woods was initially a student of philosophy and French at Birmingham University, but transferred to Keele University in Staffordshire as it was a "hotbed of leftwing politics and feminism".

Drummer Peter Hammond had attended school with Foad. Foad and Woods were living together in Smethwick and performing as a folk duo. Foad asked Hammond if he was interested in forming a band. They recruited Jane Munro who had recently started playing bass. They had their first rehearsal at the upstairs function room at the Earl Grey pub in Balsall Heath.

The group were involved with the Birmingham Rock Against Racism action group, and would play gigs for the organisation with other local bands. In 1979 the band had earned enough money through gigging to self-release their own single, "You", and print 1,000 records. They sent a copy to John Peel who played it on BBC Radio 1 and invited them onto the show to play live. The single was released under the band's own 021 Records, which later released the debut single by Musical Youth.

=== Playing with a Different Sex ===
Their first album, Playing with a Different Sex (1981), reached number 33 in the UK Albums chart and number 1 in the Independent Albums chart. It is considered a post-punk classic, with strong, sarcastic songs such as "It's Obvious" and "We're So Cool" taking a dry look at gender relations. The former has been described as a fantasy "about a time when gender roles ceased to matter".

=== Sense and Sensuality and change of lineup ===
The band's second album, Sense and Sensuality (1982), showed a greater influence of jazz, soul, funk and disco on the band's sound, but was less well received.

Bassist Jane Munro departed the band six months before their dissolution in 1983, after which the band recruited Nick O'Connor, who also played piano and synthesizers. During this period the group were further augmented by Jayne Morris (percussion and backing vocals), Graeme Hamilton (trumpet) and Cara Tivey on additional keyboards.

=== Dissolution ===
The band were scheduled to record a third album with producer Steve Lillywhite in 1983 but broke up. Woods has intimated that the hostility and violence she and other women faced playing music was a factor in the group's demise: "There comes a point where you can’t go on any more at that level," she told Nige Tassell of The Guardian.

=== Post-breakup (1984–2024) ===
Woods formed an all-woman band called the Darlings in the late 1980s, but then left the music industry. Now, as Lesley Longhurst-Woods, she works as a lawyer in London. Guitarist Paul Foad and drummer Pete Hammond formed the band End Of Chat with trumpeter Graham Hamilton. Foad is a jazz musician and music teacher. Hammond also remains an active musician and teaches percussion in Birmingham. Bass player Jane Munro is retired from working as an complementary therapist in Birmingham.

==== Rights dispute ====
Foad, Hammond, and Munro have had a dispute with Woods over the rights to the band's songs, and their royalties. Woods says that she was the lyricist and the songs originate in her experiences: "These are songs that came out of me, they’re part of me". The trio claim that the band co-wrote the songs together, and that a decision was made when they formed to share credits and royalties equally. In a joint statement, they said: "One of the founding principles of the Au Pairs was equality, and that extended to the members of the band – each one of us uniquely important. We are saddened by Lesley’s desire to take our rights away from us."

=== Reunion (2025–present) ===
In 2025, Woods approached the other former members about reforming but they declined. Woods has trademarked the band name and formed a new line up of the band. The new line-up consists of Woods, Estella Adeyeri (bass) of Big Joanie, and Thurston Moore Group’s Jem Doulton (drums) and Alex Ward (guitar). In 2026, they played shows in the UK and Europe.

== Discography ==
=== Albums ===
- Playing with a Different Sex (Human Records, HUMAN 1, 1981) (No. 33 UK)
- Sense and Sensuality (Kamera Records, KAM 010, 1982) (No. 79 UK)

=== Singles ===
- "You" / "Domestic Departure" / "Kerb Crawler" (021 Records, OTO 2, 1979)
- "It's Obvious" / "Diet" (021 Records, OTO 4, 1980) (No. 37 on the US Billboard Club Play Singles charts)
- "Inconvenience" / "Pretty Boys" (Human Records, HUM 8, 1981)
- "Inconvenience" / "Pretty Boys" / "Headache For Michelle" (remix) (Human Records, HUM 8/12, 1981)

=== Live and compilation albums ===
- Live in Berlin (AKA Records, AKA6, recorded 1982, released 1983)
- Shocks to the System: The Very Best of the Au Pairs (Cherry Red, CDMRED161, 1999)
- Equal But Different - BBC Sessions 79-81 (RPM, RPM139)
- Stepping Out of Line: The Anthology (Castle Music, CMQDD1338, released May 2006 in the UK)
- Equally Different. Live in Berlin, 1981, Suffragette Production SP 27 (bootleg)

== Members ==
- Lesley Woods - guitar/vocals (1978 - 83, 2025 - present)
- Alex Ward - guitar (2025 - present)
- Estella Adeyeri - bass (2025 - present)
- Jem Doulton - drums (2025 - present)

=== Original members ===
- Paul Foad - guitar/vocals (1978 - 83)
- Jane Munro (now Dowsett) - bass (1978 - 83)
- Pete Hammond - drums (1978 - 83)

=== 1983 members ===
- Nick O'Connor - bass/keyboards/backing vocals (1983)
- Jayne Morris - percussion/backing vocals (1983)
- Graeme Hamilton - trumpet (1983)
- Cara Tivey - additional keyboards (1983)

== Critical reception ==
In mid-1981 critic Robin Denselow of the London Guardian praised the group's "viciously well-observed lyrics on contemporary life and love and the role of women’. Music historian Gillian G. Gaar noted in her 2002 She's a Rebel: The History of Women in Rock and Roll (Live Girls) that the band mingled male and female musicians in a revolutionary collaborative way, as part of its outspoken explorations of sexual politics. Lester Bangs wrote that "the absolute best rock’n’roll anywhere today is being played by women: last night I saw God in the form of the Au Pairs."

== Influence ==
Kathleen Hanna of Bikini Kill cited the Au Pairs as an influence on her band, and the wider riot grrrl movement. Miki Berenyi of Lush has named the band as an influence, saying of first hearing "Diet", "the spikiness lit up my teenage synapses", and that "Playing with a Different Sex is one of my formative albums, and it’s never far from my thoughts when writing my own lyrics".
