= TARP (gene) =

Protein-coding gene in the species Homo sapiens

Identifiers
- Aliases: TARP, CD3G, TCRG, TCRGC1, TCRGC2, TCRGV, TCR gamma alternate reading frame protein
- External IDs: OMIM: 609642; HomoloGene: 128237; GeneCards: TARP; OMA:TARP - orthologs

Gene location (Human)
Chr.	Chromosome 7 (human)
Band	7p14.1	Start	38,257,879 bp
Band	7p14.1	End	38,265,678 bp
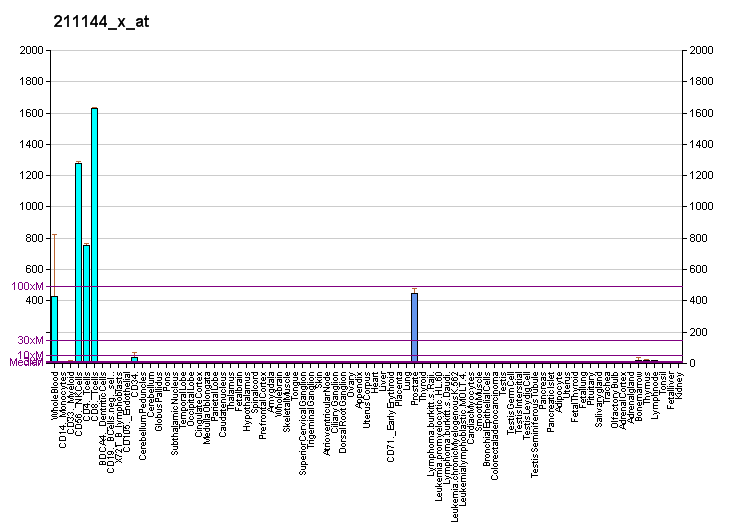

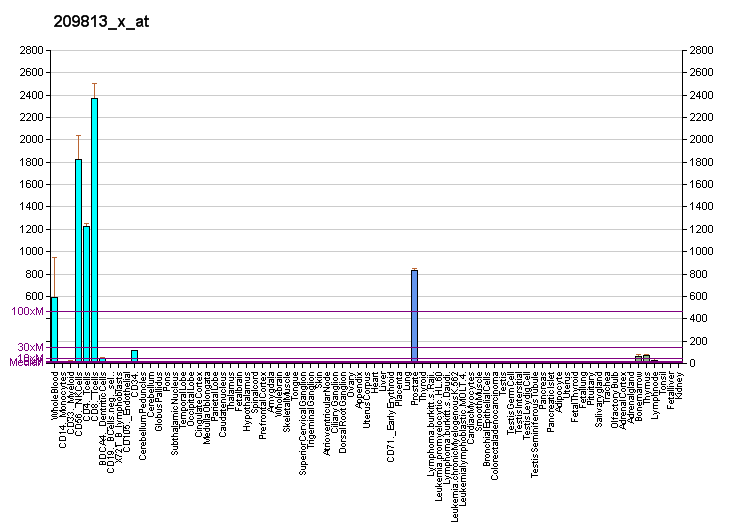

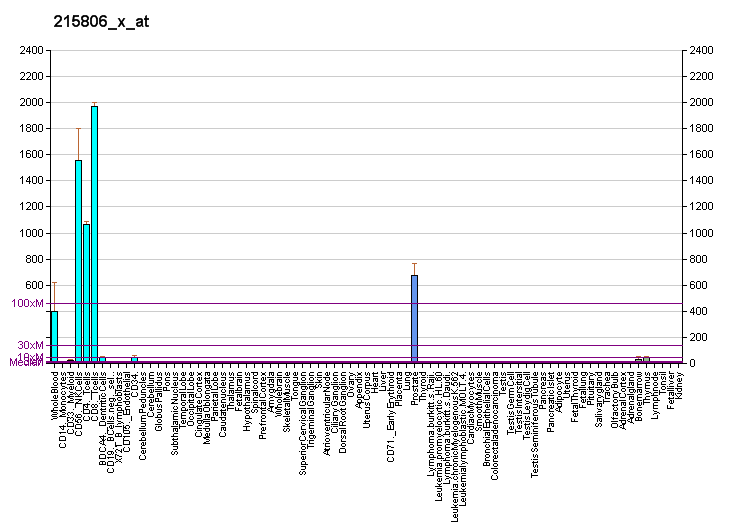
RNA expression pattern
Bgee	Human / Mouse (ortholog); Top expressed in: prostate; granulocyte; testicle; bone marrow; blood; bone marrow cells; spleen; lymph node; mucosa of transverse colon; appendix / n/a; More reference expression data
BioGPS	More reference expression data
Orthologs
Species	Human	Mouse
Entrez	445347	n/a
Ensembl	ENSG00000211689	n/a
UniProt	Q0VGM3	n/a
RefSeq (mRNA)	NM_001003799; NM_001003806	n/a
RefSeq (protein)	NP_001003806.1	n/a
Location (UCSC)	Chr 7: 38.26 – 38.27 Mb	n/a
PubMed search		n/a
- Wikidata
View/Edit Human

TCR gamma alternate reading frame protein, also known as TARP, is a human gene.

In some non-lymphoid tissues, the unrearranged T cell receptor gamma (TRG@) locus is expressed. The resulting transcript contains a subset of the TRG@ gene segments and is shorter than TRG@ transcripts expressed in lymphoid tissues.

This RefSeq record represents the unrearranged TRG@ locus transcript; the complete TRG@ locus is represented by the genomic RefSeq NG_001336. The transcript represented by this RefSeq has two open reading frames (ORFs) that encode different proteins. The downstream ORF is in the same frame as TRG@ and its protein product is similar to TRG@ proteins. The upstream ORF uses a different reading frame and encodes a novel protein.
