= Joghanab-e Olya =

Joghanab-e Olya جغناب عليا
- Village
- Location within Iran
- Coordinates: 38°47′00″N 47°08′00″E
- Country: Iran
- Province: East Azerbaijan
- County: Kaleybar
- Bakhsh: Central
- Rural District: Peyghan Chayi

Population (2006)
  - Total: 56
- Time zone: UTC+3:30 (IRST)
  - Summer (DST): UTC+4:30 (IRDT)

Joghanab-e Olya (Persian: جغناب عليا, also Romanized as Joghanāb-e ‘Olyā) is a village in Peyghan Chayi Rural District, in the Central District of Kaleybar County, East Azerbaijan Province, Iran. At the 2006 census, its population was 56, in 14 families.
