= 6 Underground =

6 Underground may refer to:

- 6 Underground (film), a 2019 film directed by Michael Bay
- "6 Underground" (song), by Sneaker Pimps, 1996
- 6underground, a music venue in Manila, Philippines
