= Dibaklu, Charuymaq =

Dibaklu ديبكلو
- Village
- Location within Iran
- Coordinates: 36°59′32″N 46°59′32″E
- Country: Iran
- Province: East Azerbaijan
- County: Charuymaq
- Bakhsh: Central
- Rural District: Charuymaq-e Jonubegharbi

Population (2006)
  - Total: 35
- Time zone: UTC+3:30 (IRST)
  - Summer (DST): UTC+4:30 (IRDT)

Dibaklu (Persian: ديبكلو, also Romanized as Dībaklū; also known as Dabaklū) is a village in Charuymaq-e Jonubegharbi Rural District, in the Central District of Charuymaq County, East Azerbaijan Province, Iran. At the 2006 census, its population was 35, in 6 families.
