= Terminal Identifier – Address Resolution Protocol =

Terminal Identifier – Address Resolution Protocol (TARP) is a protocol defined in Telcordia Technologies (formerly Bellcore) Generic Requirements document GR-253-CORE for SONET and used in OSS to resolve a TL1 TID to a CLNP address (NSAP) of a Network Element (NE). The protocol is used in a number of network devices. Steven R. Kim originally developed the protocol while working for Fujitsu Network Systems.
