= Suli Daraq, Kaleybar =

Suli Daraq سولي درق
- Village
- Location within Iran
- Coordinates: 38°46′01″N 47°19′17″E
- Country: Iran
- Province: East Azerbaijan
- County: Kaleybar
- Bakhsh: Abish Ahmad
- Rural District: Abish Ahmad

Population (2006)
  - Total: 74
- Time zone: UTC+3:30 (IRST)
  - Summer (DST): UTC+4:30 (IRDT)

Suli Daraq (Persian: سولي درق, also Romanized as Sūlī Daraq) is a village in Abish Ahmad Rural District, Abish Ahmad District, Kaleybar County, East Azerbaijan Province, Iran. At the 2006 census, its population was 74, in 16 families.
