= Torshkuh, Gilan =

Torshkuh ترشكوه
- Village
- Location within Iran
- Coordinates: 37°01′27″N 50°19′53″E
- Country: Iran
- Province: Gilan
- County: Rudsar
- Bakhsh: Rahimabad
- Rural District: Rahimabad

Population (2006)
  - Total: 594
- Time zone: UTC+3:30 (IRST)
  - Summer (DST): UTC+4:30 (IRDT)

Torshkuh (Persian: ترشكوه, also Romanized as Torshkūh) is a village in Rahimabad Rural District, Rahimabad District, Rudsar County, Gilan Province, Iran. At the 2006 census, its population was 594, in 151 families.
