= Shabanluy-e Olya =

Shabanluy-e Olya شعبانلوي عليا
- Village
- Location within Iran
- Coordinates: 38°26′24″N 44°53′57″E
- Country: Iran
- Province: West Azerbaijan
- County: Khoy
- Bakhsh: Central
- Rural District: Rahal

Population (2006)
  - Total: 267
- Time zone: UTC+3:30 (IRST)
  - Summer (DST): UTC+4:30 (IRDT)

Shabanluy-e Olya (Persian: شعبانلوي عليا, also Romanized as Sha‘bānlūy-e ‘Olyā; also known as Bīlehverdī and Pīleh Verdī) is a village in Rahal Rural District, in the Central District of Khoy County, West Azerbaijan Province, Iran. At the 2006 census, its population was 267, in 70 families.
