= Analog Pussy =

Psychedelic trance group

Analog Pussy אנלוג פוסי
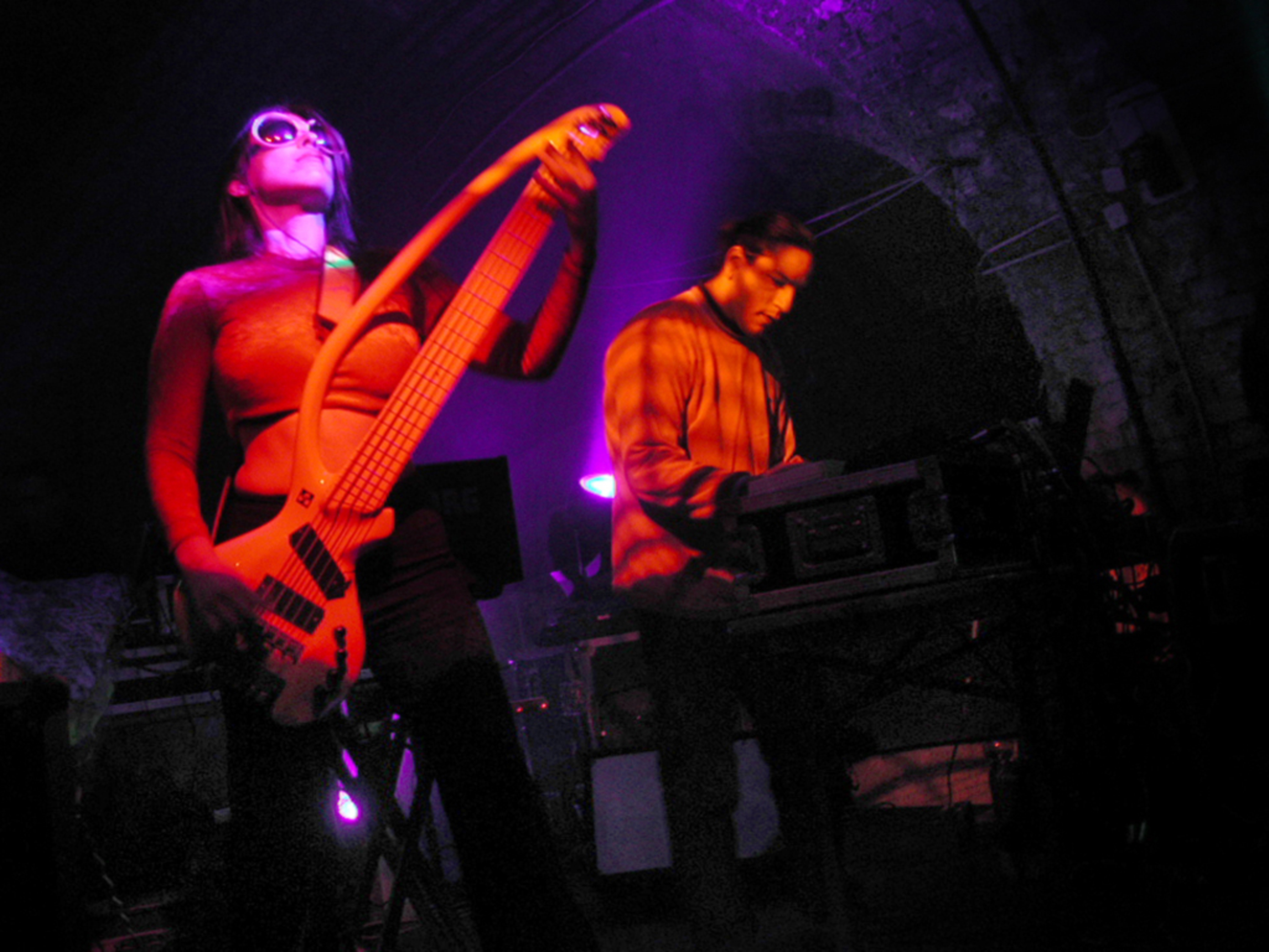
- Analog Pussy Live in Austria

Background information
- Origin: Israel
- Genres: Trance; Psy trance Goa trance
- Years active: 1997–present
- Label: Analog Pussy Records
- Members: Kim Lilach Michael (Jiga); Erez (Jinno)
- Website: https://www.analog-pussy.com, www.analog-pussy.org

Analog Pussy (Hebrew: אנלוג פוסי) is a psychedelic trance group that originated in Israel, now located in Germany.

== History ==
Jiga was born in Jerusalem. At age 15 she learned to play a bass guitar and played in punk bands. She bought a $50 synthesizer and a computer and began producing on her own. Jinno was born in Montevideo, Uruguay and moved to Israel in his early childhood. In his teens he experimented with electronic music when he connected several synthesizers together. The two met when Jiga broke away from the punk/metal genre and was interested in electronic music and in 1997 formed Analog Pussy together.

== Career ==
Jiga and Jinno built a studio in their living room where they produced their first tracks. They made their music available for free on the internet and gained a fan-base. Later on, when they headlined the Electronic charts on MP3.com, their music was downloaded over one million times.

In 1999, coming back from their first European tour, they signed with the German label Balloonia Records and released their first album, "Psycho Bitch From Hell".

Jiga and Jinno relocated to Germany in 2002 and launched their own record label "AP Records", whose first release was their second album, "Underground".

In mid 2004 they released their third album "Trance 'N Roll". The songs feature live instruments, hard rock guitar riffs and vocals.

The instrument most associated with Analog Pussy is a yellow bass guitar by BassLab, played by Jiga.

== Breakup ==
The duo broke up their personal and musical relationship in 2007. Jiga continues to play live and release new music as Analog Pussy.

== Releases ==
- MP3001 (1999)
- Psycho Bitch from Hell (Balloonia Records 1999)
- Underground (2001)
- Vinyl Trax (2002)
- Trance N Roll (2004)
- Future The Remixes (2004)
- Mister Clown ( 2012)
- Alive (2012)
- Creme de la Pussy (2013)
