= Bedevostan-e Gharbi Rural District =

Rural district in East Azerbaijan province, Iran

Bedevostan-e Gharbi Rural District Persian: دهستان بدوستان غربي
- Rural District
- Location within Iran
- Coordinates: 38°14′N 46°49′E
- Country: Iran
- Province: East Azerbaijan
- County: Heris
- District: Khvajeh
- Established: 1987
- Capital: Bilverdi

Population (2016)
  - Total: 16,242
- Time zone: UTC+3:30 (IRST)

Bedevostan-e Gharbi Rural District (Persian: دهستان بدوستان غربي) is in Khvajeh District of Heris County, East Azerbaijan province, Iran. Its capital is the village of Bilverdi.

== Demographics ==
=== Population ===
At the time of the 2006 National Census, the rural district's population was 16,259 in 3,729 households. There were 16,026 inhabitants in 4,265 households at the following census of 2011. The 2016 census measured the population of the rural district as 16,242 in 4,728 households. The most populous of its 25 villages was Arbatan (now a city), with 3,233 people.

=== Other villages in the rural district ===
- Gildir
- Janqur
- Jiqeh
- Qarajeh
- Saray
