= Khabar Rural District (Shahr-e Babak County) =

Rural district in Kerman province, Iran

Khabar Rural District Persian: دهستان خبر
- Rural District
- Location within Iran
- Coordinates: 30°29′07″N 54°39′36″E
- Country: Iran
- Province: Kerman
- County: Shahr-e Babak
- District: Dehaj
- Capital: Khabar

Population (2016)
  - Total: 4,906
- Time zone: UTC+3:30 (IRST)

Khabar Rural District (Persian: دهستان خبر) is in Dehaj District of Shahr-e Babak County, Kerman province, Iran. Its capital is the village of Khabar.

== Demographics ==
=== Population ===
At the time of the 2006 National Census, the rural district's population was 4,089 in 804 households. There were 2,881 inhabitants in 819 households at the following census of 2011. The 2016 census measured the population of the rural district as 4,906 in 1,548 households. The most populous of its 28 villages was Deh-e Pain, with 804 people.
