= Mavazekhan-e Sharqi Rural District =

Rural district in East Azerbaijan province, Iran

Mavazekhan-e Sharqi Rural District Persian: دهستان مواضع خان شرقي
- Rural District
- Location within Iran
- Coordinates: 38°13′N 46°33′E
- Country: Iran
- Province: East Azerbaijan
- County: Heris
- District: Khvajeh
- Established: 1987
- Capital: Khajeh

Population (2016)
  - Total: 3,755
- Time zone: UTC+3:30 (IRST)

Mavazekhan-e Sharqi Rural District (Persian: دهستان مواضع خان شرقي) is in Khvajeh District of Heris County, East Azerbaijan province, Iran. It is administered from the city of Khajeh.

== Demographics ==
=== Population ===
At the time of the 2006 National Census, the rural district's population was 4,274 in 994 households. There were 3,496 inhabitants in 981 households at the following census of 2011. The 2016 census measured the population of the rural district as 3,755 in 1,115 households. The most populous of its 15 villages was Nahand, with 1,061 people.

=== Other villages in the rural district ===
- Amandi
- Gamand
