= Dehaj Rural District =

Rural district in Kerman province, Iran

Dehaj Rural District Persian: دهستان دهج
- Rural District
- Location within Iran
- Coordinates: 30°47′35″N 54°52′20″E
- Country: Iran
- Province: Kerman
- County: Shahr-e Babak
- District: Dehaj
- Capital: Dehaj

Population (2016)
  - Total: 2,106
- Time zone: UTC+3:30 (IRST)

Dehaj Rural District (Persian: دهستان دهج) is in Dehaj District of Shahr-e Babak County, Kerman province, Iran. It is administered from the city of Dehaj.

== Demographics ==
=== Population ===
At the time of the 2006 National Census, the rural district's population was 3,137 in 633 households. There were 2,056 inhabitants in 625 households at the following census of 2011. The 2016 census measured the population of the rural district as 2,106 in 799 households. The most populous of its 82 villages was Khademiyeh, with 219 people.
