= Mavazekhan-e Shomali Rural District =

Rural district in East Azerbaijan province, Iran

Mavazekhan-e Shomali Rural District Persian: دهستان مواضع خان شمالي
- Rural District
- Location within Iran
- Coordinates: 38°18′N 46°37′E
- Country: Iran
- Province: East Azerbaijan
- County: Heris
- District: Khvajeh
- Established: 1987
- Capital: Sarand

Population (2016)
  - Total: 4,527
- Time zone: UTC+3:30 (IRST)

Mavazekhan-e Shomali Rural District (Persian: دهستان مواضع خان شمالي) is in Khvajeh District of Heris County, East Azerbaijan province, Iran. Its capital is the village of Sarand.

== Demographics ==
=== Population ===
At the time of the 2006 National Census, the rural district's population was 5,918 in 1,297 households. There were 4,762 inhabitants in 1,296 households at the following census of 2011. The 2016 census measured the population of the rural district as 4,527 in 1,422 households. The most populous of its 28 villages was Gavij, with 551 people.

=== Other villages in the rural district ===
- Afshord
- Chay Kandi
- Chubanlar-e Sardarlu
- Di Baglu
