= Jowzam Rural District =

Rural district in Kerman province, Iran

Jowzam Rural District Persian: دهستان جوزم
- Rural District
- Location within Iran
- Coordinates: 30°30′50″N 55°04′28″E
- Country: Iran
- Province: Kerman
- County: Shahr-e Babak
- District: Dehaj
- Capital: Jowzam

Population (2016)
  - Total: 2,631
- Time zone: UTC+3:30 (IRST)

Jowzam Rural District (Persian: دهستان جوزم) is in Dehaj District of Shahr-e Babak County, Kerman province, Iran. It is administered from the city of Jowzam.

== Demographics ==
=== Population ===
At the time of the 2006 National Census, the rural district's population was 10,659 in 2,256 households. There were 2,352 inhabitants in 748 households at the following census of 2011. The 2016 census measured the population of the rural district as 2,631 in 875 households. The most populous of its 92 villages was Deh-e Shaduiyeh, with 460 people.
