= Khvajeh District =

District in East Azerbaijan province, Iran

Khvajeh District Persian: بخش خواجه
- District
- Location within Iran
- Coordinates: 38°14′N 46°42′E
- Country: Iran
- Province: East Azerbaijan
- County: Heris
- Established: 1989
- Capital: Khajeh

Population (2016)
  - Total: 28,535
- Time zone: UTC+3:30 (IRST)

Khvajeh District (Persian: بخش خواجه) is in Heris County, East Azerbaijan province, Iran. Its capital is the city of Khajeh.

== History ==
The village of Arbatan was converted to a city in 2019.

== Demographics ==
=== Population ===
At the time of the 2006 census, the district's population was 30,151 in 7,001 households. The following census in 2011 counted 28,085 people in 7,696 households. The 2016 census measured the population of the district as 28,535 inhabitants in 8,530 households.

=== Administrative divisions ===
Khvajeh District Population
| Administrative Divisions | 2006 | 2011 | 2016 |
|---|---|---|---|
| Bedevostan-e Gharbi RD | 16,259 | 16,026 | 16,242 |
| Mavazekhan-e Sharqi RD | 4,274 | 3,496 | 3,755 |
| Mavazekhan-e Shomali RD | 5,918 | 4,762 | 4,527 |
| Arbatan (city) (Note: Became a city after the 2016 census) | | | |
| Khajeh (city) | 3,700 | 3,801 | 4,011 |
| Total | 30,151 | 28,085 | 28,535 |
RD = Rural District
