= Heris County =

County in East Azerbaijan province, Iran

Heris County Persian: شهرستان هریس
- County
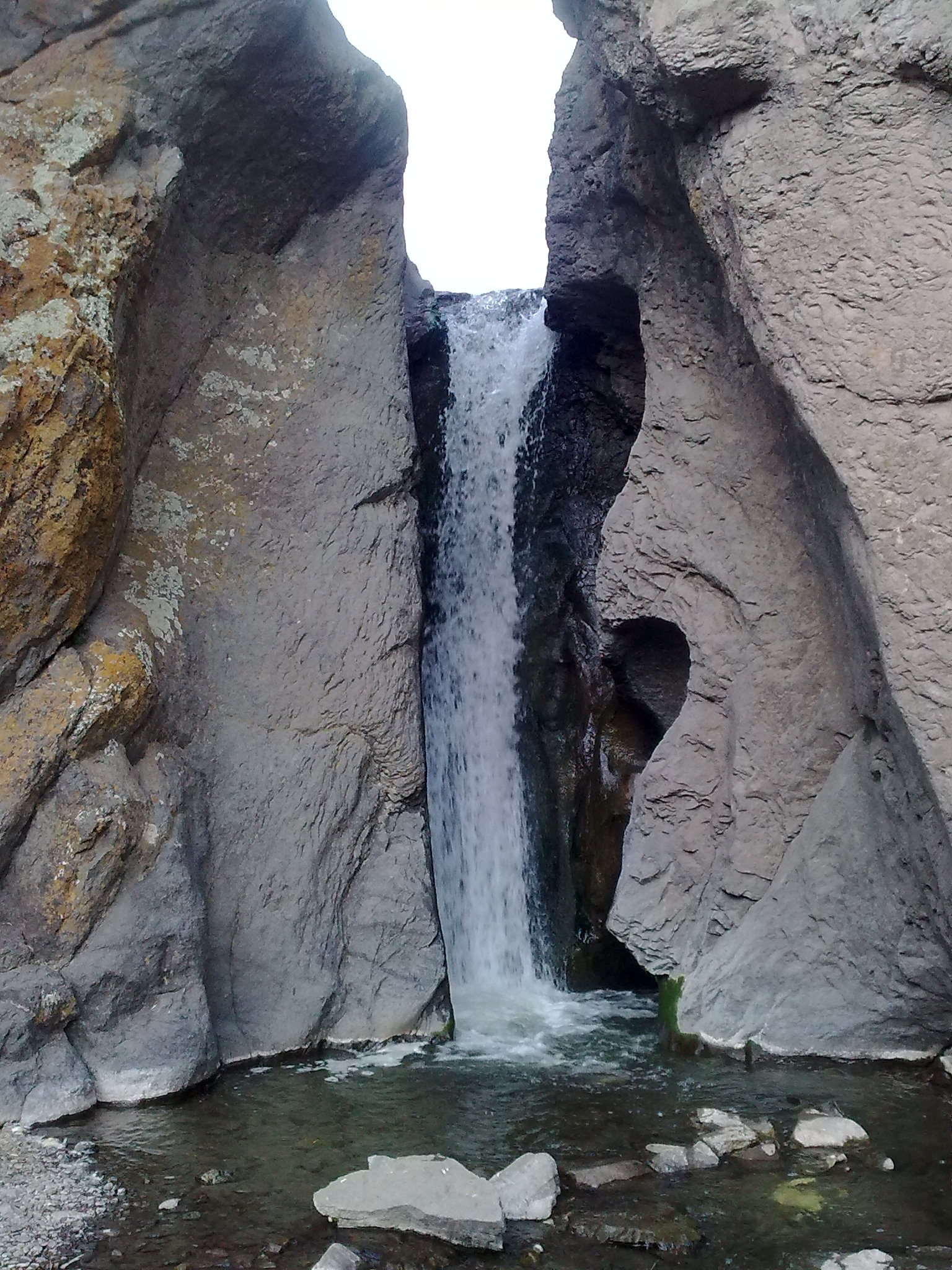
- Sharan village waterfall

- Location of Heris County in East Azerbaijan province (center, yellow)

- Location of East Azerbaijan province in Iran
- Coordinates: 38°14′N 46°53′E
- Country: Iran
- Province: East Azerbaijan
- Established: 1989
- Capital: Heris
- Districts: Central, Khvajeh

Population (2016)
  - Total: 69,093
- Time zone: UTC+3:30 (IRST)

Heris County (Persian: شهرستان هریس) is located in East Azerbaijan province, Iran. Its capital is the city of Heris.

== History ==
The village of Arbatan was elevated to the status of a city in 2019.

== Demographics ==
=== Population ===
At the time of the 2006 National Census, the county's population was 67,626, in 15,916 households. The following census in 2011 counted 67,820 people, in 18,339 households. The 2016 census measured the population of the county as 69,093, in 20,639 households.

=== Administrative divisions ===
Heris County's population history and administrative structure over three consecutive censuses are shown in the following table.

Heris County Population
Administrative Divisions	2006	2011	2016
Central District	37,475	39,735	40,558
Baruq RD (Note: Merger of Mehranrud-e Shomali and Zarnaq Rural Districts)	1,883	1,863	1,828
Bedevostan-e Sharqi RD	5,729	5,948	5,984
Khanamrud RD	3,488	3,498	3,321
Bakhshayesh (city)	5,752	6,098	6,102
Heris (city)	9,513	9,823	10,515
Kolvanaq (city)	6,344	6,792	7,465
Zarnaq (city)	4,766	5,713	5,343
Khvajeh District	30,151	28,085	28,535
Bedevostan-e Gharbi RD	16,259	16,026	16,242
Mavazekhan-e Sharqi RD	4,274	3,496	3,755
Mavazekhan-e Shomali RD	5,918	4,762	4,527
Arbatan (city) (Note: Became a city after the 2016 census)			
Khajeh (city)	3,700	3,801	4,011
Total	67,626	67,820	69,093
RD = Rural District

== See also ==
Media related to Heris County at Wikimedia Commons
