= Dehaj District =

District in Kerman province, Iran

Dehaj District Persian: بخش دهج
- District
- Location within Iran
- Coordinates: 30°40′35″N 54°50′36″E
- Country: Iran
- Province: Kerman
- County: Shahr-e Babak
- Capital: Dehaj

Population (2016)
  - Total: 18,124
- Time zone: UTC+3:30 (IRST)

Dehaj District (Persian: بخش دهج) is in Shahr-e Babak County, Kerman province, Iran. Its capital is the city of Dehaj.

== History ==
After the 2006 National Census, the village of Jowzam was elevated to the status of a city.

== Demographics ==
=== Population ===
At the time of the 2006 census, the district's population was 25,641 in 5,293 households. The following census in 2011 counted 15,584 people in 4,348 households. The 2016 census measured the population of the district as 18,124 inhabitants in 5,837 households.

=== Administrative divisions ===
Dehaj District Population
Administrative Divisions	2006	2011	2016
Dehaj RD	3,137	2,056	2,106
Jowzam RD	10,659	2,352	2,631
Khabar RD	4,089	2,881	4,906
Dehaj (city)	7,756	3,366	5,045
Jowzam (city)		4,929	3,436
Total	25,641	15,584	18,124
RD = Rural District
