= Purkan, Kerman =

Purkan پوركان
- Village
- Location within Iran
- Coordinates: 30°21′24″N 55°21′27″E
- Country: Iran
- Province: Kerman
- County: Rafsanjan
- Bakhsh: Koshkuiyeh
- Rural District: Raviz

Population (2006)
  - Total: 157
- Time zone: UTC+3:30 (IRST)
  - Summer (DST): UTC+4:30 (IRDT)

Purkan (Persian: پوركان, also Romanized as Pūrkān) is a village in Raviz Rural District, Koshkuiyeh District, Rafsanjan County, Kerman province, Iran. At the 2006 census, its population was 157, in 50 families.

== Location ==
=== Coordinates ===
UTM : CU45

The Geographical coordinates are provided in decimal degrees (WGS84) of Longitude 55.358, and Latitude 30.357. The Geographical coordinates in degrees minutes seconds (WGS84) of Latitude 30 21' 24 and Longitude 55 21' 27.

This gives the same location but expressed in two different notations, commonly used in mapping and navigation systems.

== Daylight duration ==
Sunrise by 04:14:0, and Sunset by 16:00:20.

== Place nearby purkan ==
Afrineh, Amrodu'iyeh, Bakht sefid, Bandevan, Bidu'iyeh, Doqondar, Duzakhdar, Estahu'iyeh, Fedij, Gari-ye bala, Godar-e abdar, Godar-e 'eyn od din, Hum od din, Jadal tanan, Jalalabad.
