= Kashkuiyeh (disambiguation) =

Kashkuiyeh is a city in Kerman Province, Iran.

Kashkuiyeh (Persian: كشكوئيه) may refer to:

- Kashkuiyeh, Hormozgan
- Kashkuiyeh, Bandar Abbas, Hormozgan Province
- Kashkuiyeh, Baft, Kerman Province
- Kashkuiyeh, Jiroft, Kerman Province
- Kashkuiyeh, alternate name of Kushkuiyeh, Kerman, Jiroft County, Kerman Province
- Kashkuiyeh, Sirjan, Kerman Province

== See also ==
- Kushkuiyeh (disambiguation)
