= Deh-e Qazi =

Deh-e Qazi or Deh Qazi (Persian: ده قاضي) may refer to various places in Iran:

- Deh-e Qazi, Kerman
- Deh-e Qazi, Shahr-e Babak, Kerman Province
- Deh-e Qazi, Zarand, Kerman Province
- Deh Qazi, Kohgiluyeh and Boyer-Ahmad
- Deh-e Qazi, Damghan, Semnan Province
