= Senjedkuh =

Senjedkuh سنجدكوه
- Village
- Location within Iran
- Coordinates: 30°21′32″N 55°12′48″E
- Country: Iran
- Province: Kerman
- County: Shahr-e Babak
- Bakhsh: Central
- Rural District: Madvarat

Population (2006)
  - Total: 26
- Time zone: UTC+3:30 (IRST)
  - Summer (DST): UTC+4:30 (IRDT)

Senjedkuh (Persian: سنجدكوه, also Romanized as Senjedkūh; also known as Senjedkū’īyeh) is a village in Madvarat Rural District, in the Central District of Shahr-e Babak County, Kerman Province, Iran. At the 2006 census, its population was 26, in 10 families.
