= Khaleng =

Khaleng خالنگ
- Village
- Location within Iran
- Coordinates: 30°23′58″N 55°12′08″E
- Country: Iran
- Province: Kerman
- County: Shahr-e Babak
- Bakhsh: Central
- Rural District: Madvarat

Population (2006)
  - Total: 22
- Time zone: UTC+3:30 (IRST)
  - Summer (DST): UTC+4:30 (IRDT)

Khaleng (Persian: خالنگ, also Romanized as Khāleng; also known as Khāleng’ī) is a village in Madvarat Rural District, in the Central District of Shahr-e Babak County, Kerman Province, Iran. At the 2006 census, its population was 22, in 8 families.
