= Deh Now-e Farrokhzad =

Deh Now-e Farrokhzad دهنوفرخ زاد
- Village
- Location within Iran
- Coordinates: 30°04′28″N 55°10′27″E
- Country: Iran
- Province: Kerman
- County: Shahr-e Babak
- Bakhsh: Central
- Rural District: Khatunabad

Population (2006)
  - Total: 53
- Time zone: UTC+3:30 (IRST)
  - Summer (DST): UTC+4:30 (IRDT)

Deh Now-e Farrokhzad (Persian: دهنوفرخ زاد, also romanized as Deh Now-e Farrokhzād; also known as ‘Arab Oghlū) is a village in Khatunabad Rural District, in the Central District of Shahr-e Babak County, Kerman Province, Iran. At the 2006 census, its population was 53, in 11 families.
