= Behnuiyeh =

Behnuiyeh بهنوييه
- Village
- Location within Iran
- Coordinates: 30°21′59″N 55°10′07″E
- Country: Iran
- Province: Kerman
- County: Shahr-e Babak
- Bakhsh: Central
- Rural District: Madvarat

Population (2006)
  - Total: 109
- Time zone: UTC+3:30 (IRST)
  - Summer (DST): UTC+4:30 (IRDT)

Behnuiyeh (Persian: بهنوييه, also Romanized as Behnū’īyeh and Bahnū’īyeh; also known as Behnow, Behnu, and Chāvārchi) is a village in Madvarat Rural District, in the Central District of Shahr-e Babak County, Kerman Province, Iran. At the 2006 census, its population was 109, in 31 families.
