= Gozgestan =

Gozgestan گزگستان
- Village
- Location within Iran
- Coordinates: 30°24′47″N 55°13′33″E
- Country: Iran
- Province: Kerman
- County: Shahr-e Babak
- Bakhsh: Central
- Rural District: Madvarat

Population (2006)
  - Total: 19
- Time zone: UTC+3:30 (IRST)
  - Summer (DST): UTC+4:30 (IRDT)

Gozgestan (Persian: گزگستان, also Romanized as Gozgestān; also known as Bozestān) is a village in Madvarat Rural District, in the Central District of Shahr-e Babak County, Kerman Province, Iran. At the 2006 census, its population was 19, in 5 families.
