= Geshnizuiyeh =

Geshnizuiyeh گشنيزوييه
- Village
- Location within Iran
- Coordinates: 30°21′44″N 55°08′13″E
- Country: Iran
- Province: Kerman
- County: Shahr-e Babak
- Bakhsh: Central
- Rural District: Madvarat

Population (2006)
  - Total: 107
- Time zone: UTC+3:30 (IRST)
  - Summer (DST): UTC+4:30 (IRDT)

Geshnizuiyeh (Persian: گشنيزوييه, also Romanized as Geshnīzū’īyeh; also known as Gīshnīzū’īyeh) is a village in Madvarat Rural District, in the Central District of Shahr-e Babak County, Kerman Province, Iran. At the 2006 census, its population was at 107, in 26 families.
