= Riseh =

Riseh ريسه
- Village
- Location within Iran
- Coordinates: 30°19′00″N 55°24′33″E
- Country: Iran
- Province: Kerman
- County: Shahr-e Babak
- Bakhsh: Central
- Rural District: Pa Qaleh

Population (2006)
  - Total: 295
- Time zone: UTC+3:30 (IRST)
  - Summer (DST): UTC+4:30 (IRDT)

Riseh (Persian: ريسه, also Romanized as Rīseh; also known as Rīzeh and Rīzh) is a village in Pa Qaleh Rural District, in the Central District of Shahr-e Babak County, Kerman Province, Iran. At the 2006 census, its population was 295, in 96 families.
