= Harnashak =

Harnashak هرناشك
- Village
- Location within Iran
- Coordinates: 30°22′12″N 55°06′13″E
- Country: Iran
- Province: Kerman
- County: Shahr-e Babak
- Bakhsh: Central
- Rural District: Madvarat

Population (2006)
  - Total: 54
- Time zone: UTC+3:30 (IRST)
  - Summer (DST): UTC+4:30 (IRDT)

Harnashak (Persian: هرناشك, also Romanized as Harnāshak and Hernāshk) is a village in Madvarat Rural District, in the Central District of Shahr-e Babak County, Kerman Province, Iran. At the 2006 census, its population was 54, in 22 families.
