= Aliabad-e Kafi =

Aliabad-e Kafi علي ابادكافي
- Village
- Location within Iran
- Coordinates: 30°19′29″N 54°49′21″E
- Country: Iran
- Province: Kerman
- County: Shahr-e Babak
- Bakhsh: Central
- Rural District: Khursand

Population (2006)
  - Total: 55
- Time zone: UTC+3:30 (IRST)
  - Summer (DST): UTC+4:30 (IRDT)

Aliabad-e Kafi (Persian: علي ابادكافي, also Romanized as ‘Alīābād-e Kāfī; also known as ‘Alīābād) is a village in Khursand Rural District, in the Central District of Shahr-e Babak County, Kerman Province, Iran. At the 2006 census, its population was 55, in 13 families.
