= Lay Shokerkuiyeh =

Lay Shokerkuiyeh لاي شكركوئيه
- Village
- Country: Iran
- Province: Kerman
- County: Shahr-e Babak
- Bakhsh: Central
- Rural District: Meymand

Population (2006)
  - Total: 30
- Time zone: UTC+3:30 (IRST)
  - Summer (DST): UTC+4:30 (IRDT)

Lay Shokerkuiyeh (Persian: لاي شكركوئيه, also Romanized as Lāy Shokerkū’īyeh) is a village in Meymand Rural District, in the Central District of Shahr-e Babak County, Kerman Province, Iran. At the 2006 census, its population was 30, in 4 families.
