= Daryiduiyeh =

Daryiduiyeh درئيدوئيه
- Village
- Country: Iran
- Province: Kerman
- County: Shahr-e Babak
- Bakhsh: Central
- Rural District: Madvarat

Population (2006)
  - Total: 17
- Time zone: UTC+3:30 (IRST)
  - Summer (DST): UTC+4:30 (IRDT)

Daryiduiyeh (Persian: درئيدوئيه, also Romanized as Daryiīdū’īyeh) is a village in Madvarat Rural District, in the Central District of Shahr-e Babak County, Kerman Province, Iran. At the 2006 census, its population was 17, in 9 families.
