= Eshkur =

Eshkur اشكور
- Village
- Location within Iran
- Coordinates: 30°02′43″N 55°11′12″E
- Country: Iran
- Province: Kerman
- County: Shahr-e Babak
- Bakhsh: Central
- Rural District: Estabraq

Population (2006)
  - Total: 295
- Time zone: UTC+3:30 (IRST)
  - Summer (DST): UTC+4:30 (IRDT)

Eshkur (Persian: اشكور, also Romanized as Eshkūr) is a village in Estabraq Rural District, in the Central District of Shahr-e Babak County, Kerman Province, Iran. At the 2006 census, its population was 295, in 71 families.
