= Hesaruiyeh =

Hesaruiyeh حصاروييه
- Village
- Location within Iran
- Coordinates: 30°02′37″N 55°12′59″E
- Country: Iran
- Province: Kerman
- County: Shahr-e Babak
- Bakhsh: Central
- Rural District: Khatunabad

Population (2006)
  - Total: 221
- Time zone: UTC+3:30 (IRST)
  - Summer (DST): UTC+4:30 (IRDT)

Hesaruiyeh (Persian: حصاروييه, Romanized as Ḩeşārū’īyeh; also known as Hazār, Hazārū, and Hisāru) is a village in Khatunabad Rural District, in the Central District of Shahr-e Babak County, Kerman Province, Iran. At the 2006 census, its population was 221, in 54 families. Hesaruiyeh is located roughly 10 kilometres (6.2 mi) southeast of Shahr-e Babak.

== Etymology ==
One local author suggests that the name comes from the words Ḩeşār (حصار), meaning "fort", "fence", "wall", or "barrier", and bārū (بارو) meaning "fortification".

== History ==
Ḩeşārū’īyeh served as the stronghold of the Ismailis and is home to many Ismailis who have contributed a lot to building Shahr-e-Babak when they ruled Shahr-e Babak during their rule in the 19th century.

== Surroundings ==
Ḩeşārū’īyeh is located close to Road 71, a national highway that connects Tehran in the north to Bandar-Abbas in the South. In addition to the forts and the barriers, there is a nearby horseshoe-shaped hill called Tale-h Hesar, meaning "hill of the fort".
