= Madvar, Kerman =

Madvar مدوار
- Village
- Location within Iran
- Coordinates: 30°14′43″N 55°06′52″E
- Country: Iran
- Province: Kerman
- County: Shahr-e Babak
- Bakhsh: Central
- Rural District: Khursand

Population (2006)
  - Total: 87
- Time zone: UTC+3:30 (IRST)
  - Summer (DST): UTC+4:30 (IRDT)

Madvar (Persian: مدوار, also Romanized as Madvār; also known as Madvīr) is a village in Khursand Rural District, in the Central District of Shahr-e Babak County, Kerman Province, Iran. At the 2006 census, its population was 87, in 23 families.
