= Behjatabad =

Behjatabad (Persian: بهجت اباد) may refer to:

- Behjatabad, East Azerbaijan
- Behjatabad, Kerman
- Behjatabad, Mazandaran
- Behjatabad, Qazvin
- Behjatabad, Sistan and Baluchestan
