= Galuzardab =

Galuzardab گلوزرداب
- Village
- Location within Iran
- Coordinates: 30°05′30″N 55°06′39″E
- Country: Iran
- Province: Kerman
- County: Shahr-e Babak
- Bakhsh: Central
- Rural District: Estabraq

Population (2006)
  - Total: 185
- Time zone: UTC+3:30 (IRST)
  - Summer (DST): UTC+4:30 (IRDT)

Galuzardab (Persian: گلوزرداب, also romanized as Galūzardāb; also known as Gol Zardeh and Gol Zardū) is a village in Estabraq Rural District, in the Central District of Shahr-e Babak County, Kerman Province, Iran. At the 2006 census, its population was 185, in 33 families.
