= Shamshir Gard =

Shamshir Gard شمشيرگرد
- Village
- Location within Iran
- Coordinates: 30°05′09″N 55°03′48″E
- Country: Iran
- Province: Kerman
- County: Shahr-e Babak
- Bakhsh: Central
- Rural District: Estabraq

Population (2006)
  - Total: 78
- Time zone: UTC+3:30 (IRST)
  - Summer (DST): UTC+4:30 (IRDT)

Shamshir Gard (Persian: شمشيرگرد, also Romanized as Shamshīr Gard and Shamshīr Gerd; also known as Shamshīrābād) is a village in Estabraq Rural District, in the Central District of Shahr-e Babak County, Kerman Province, Iran. At the 2006 census, its population was 78, in 21 families.
