= Gohort =

Gohort گهرت
- Village
- Location within Iran
- Coordinates: 30°04′15″N 55°12′20″E
- Country: Iran
- Province: Kerman
- County: Shahr-e Babak
- Bakhsh: Central
- Rural District: Khatunabad

Population (2006)
  - Total: 254
- Time zone: UTC+3:30 (IRST)
  - Summer (DST): UTC+4:30 (IRDT)

Gohort (Persian: گهرت, also Romanized as Gahrt; also known as Bāvard and Gāhvard) is a village in Khatunabad Rural District, in the Central District of Shahr-e Babak County, Kerman Province, Iran. At the 2006 census, its population was 254, in 67 families.
