= La Gerdu, Kerman =

La Gerdu لاگردو
- Village
- Location within Iran
- Coordinates: 30°24′17″N 55°17′52″E
- Country: Iran
- Province: Kerman
- County: Shahr-e Babak
- Bakhsh: Central
- Rural District: Madvarat

Population (2006)
  - Total: 92
- Time zone: UTC+3:30 (IRST)
  - Summer (DST): UTC+4:30 (IRDT)

La Gerdu (Persian: لاگردو, also Romanized as Lā Gerdū; also known as Lāy Gerdū) is a village in Madvarat Rural District, in the Central District of Shahr-e Babak County, Kerman Province, Iran. At the 2006 census, its population was 92, in 27 families.
