= Abdolabad, Shahr-e Babak =

Abdolabad عبدل‌آباد
- village
- Location within Iran
- Coordinates: 30°04′08″N 55°12′39″E
- Country: Iran
- Province: Kerman
- County: Shahr-e Babak
- Bakhsh: Central
- Rural District: Khatunabad

Population (2006)
  - Total: 72
- Time zone: UTC+3:30 (IRST)
  - Summer (DST): UTC+4:30 (IRDT)

Abdolabad (Persian: عبدل‌آباد, also Romanized as ‘Abdolābād; also known as Abdollāhābād and ‘Abdollāhābād) is a village in Khatunabad Rural District, in the Central District of Shahr-e Babak County, Kerman Province, Iran. At the 2006 census, its population was 72, in 20 families.
