= Ab Dar =

Ab Dar or Abdar (Persian: ابدر) may refer to:

- Abdar, East Azerbaijan, a village in Iran
- Ab Dar, Lorestan, a village in Iran
- Abdar, Hamadan, a village in Iran
- Abdar, Kerman, a village in Iran
- Abdar, Shahr-e Babak, a village in Iran
- Abdar Miyan, a village in Iran

== See also ==
- Dar Ab (disambiguation)
