= Bid Andar, Shahr-e Babak =

Bid Andar بيدوندر
- Village
- Location within Iran
- Coordinates: 30°29′28″N 55°16′35″E
- Country: Iran
- Province: Kerman
- County: Shahr-e Babak
- Bakhsh: Central
- Rural District: Madvarat

Population (2006)
  - Total: 123
- Time zone: UTC+3:30 (IRST)
  - Summer (DST): UTC+4:30 (IRDT)

Bid Andar (Persian: بيدوندر, also Romanized as Bīd Andar) is a village in Madvarat Rural District, in the Central District of Shahr-e Babak County, Kerman Province, Iran. In the 2006 census the population of the village was 123 people in 28 different families.
