= Kuhsenjan =

Kuhsenjan كوه سنجان
- Village
- Location within Iran
- Coordinates: 30°25′39″N 55°20′16″E
- Country: Iran
- Province: Kerman
- County: Shahr-e Babak
- Bakhsh: Central
- Rural District: Madvarat

Population (2006)
  - Total: 125
- Time zone: UTC+3:30 (IRST)
  - Summer (DST): UTC+4:30 (IRDT)

Kuhsenjan (Persian: كوه سنجان, also Romanized as Kūhsenjān) is a village in Madvarat Rural District, in the Central District of Shahr-e Babak County, Kerman Province, Iran. At the 2006 census, its population was 125, in 36 families.
