= Tavakkolabad, Khursand =

Tavakkolabad توكل اباد
- Village
- Country: Iran
- Province: Kerman
- County: Shahr-e Babak
- Bakhsh: Central
- Rural District: Khursand

Population (2006)
  - Total: 69
- Time zone: UTC+3:30 (IRST)
  - Summer (DST): UTC+4:30 (IRDT)

Tavakkolabad (Persian: توكل اباد, also Romanized as Tavakkolābād) is a village in Khursand Rural District, in the Central District of Shahr-e Babak County, Kerman Province, Iran. At the 2006 census, its population was 69, in 18 families.
