= Nadik =

Nadik نديك
- Village
- Location within Iran
- Coordinates: 30°22′59″N 55°03′37″E
- Country: Iran
- Province: Kerman
- County: Shahr-e Babak
- Bakhsh: Central
- Rural District: Madvarat

Population (2006)
  - Total: 333
- Time zone: UTC+3:30 (IRST)
  - Summer (DST): UTC+4:30 (IRDT)

Nadik (Persian: نديك, also Romanized as Nadīk; also known as Nadbak) is a village in Madvarat Rural District, in the Central District of Shahr-e Babak County, Kerman Province, Iran. At the 2006 census, its population was 333, in 80 families.
