= Bab Hayyeh =

Bab Hayyeh باب هيه
- Village
- Location within Iran
- Coordinates: 30°15′37″N 55°29′33″E
- Country: Iran
- Province: Kerman
- County: Shahr-e Babak
- Bakhsh: Central
- Rural District: Pa Qaleh

Population (2006)
  - Total: 33
- Time zone: UTC+3:30 (IRST)
  - Summer (DST): UTC+4:30 (IRDT)

Bab Hayyeh (Persian: باب هيه, also Romanized as Bāb Ḩayyeh; also known as Bābāhi, Bābhā’īyeh, Bābā Ḩayyeh, and Bābūyeh) is a village in Pa Qaleh Rural District, in the Central District of Shahr-e Babak County, Kerman Province, Iran. At the 2006 census, its population was 33, in 10 families.
