= Dehnagareh =

Dehnagareh دهنگره
- Village
- Country: Iran
- Province: Kerman
- County: Shahr-e Babak
- Bakhsh: Central
- Rural District: Estabraq

Population (2006)
  - Total: 14
- Time zone: UTC+3:30 (IRST)
  - Summer (DST): UTC+4:30 (IRDT)

Dehnagareh (Persian: دهنگره) is a village in Estabraq Rural District, in the Central District of Shahr-e Babak County, Kerman Province, Iran. As of the 2006 census, its population was 14, in 4 families.
