= Robat, Shahr-e Babak =

Robat رباط
- Village
- Location within Iran
- Coordinates: 30°02′49″N 54°48′03″E
- Country: Iran
- Province: Kerman
- County: Shahr-e Babak
- Bakhsh: Central
- Rural District: Khursand

Population (2006)
  - Total: 571
- Time zone: UTC+3:30 (IRST)
  - Summer (DST): UTC+4:30 (IRDT)

Robat (Persian: رباط, also Romanized as Robāţ; also known as Ribāt and Robāţ-e Shahr-e Bābak) is a village in Khursand Rural District, in the Central District of Shahr-e Babak County, Kerman Province, Iran. At the 2006 census, its population was 571, in 139 families.
