= Hoseynabad-e Robat =

Hoseynabad-e Robat حسين ابادرباط
- Village
- Location within Iran
- Coordinates: 30°03′10″N 54°47′11″E
- Country: Iran
- Province: Kerman
- County: Shahr-e Babak
- Bakhsh: Central
- Rural District: Khursand

Population (2006)
  - Total: 157
- Time zone: UTC+3:30 (IRST)
  - Summer (DST): UTC+4:30 (IRDT)

Hoseynabad-e Robat (Persian: حسين ابادرباط, also Romanized as Ḩoseynābād-e Robāṭ) is a village in Khursand Rural District, in the Central District of Shahr-e Babak County, Kerman Province, Iran. At the 2006 census, its population was 157, in 31 families.
