= Hoseynabad-e Madvar =

Hoseynabad-e Madvar حسين ابادمدوار
- Village
- Location within Iran
- Coordinates: 30°14′30″N 55°06′06″E
- Country: Iran
- Province: Kerman
- County: Shahr-e Babak
- Bakhsh: Central
- Rural District: Khursand

Population (2006)
  - Total: 20
- Time zone: UTC+3:30 (IRST)
  - Summer (DST): UTC+4:30 (IRDT)

Hoseynabad-e Madvar (Persian: حسين ابادمدوار, also Romanized as Ḩoseynābād-e Madvār; also known as Ḩoseynābād) is a village in Khursand Rural District, in the Central District of Shahr-e Babak County, Kerman Province, Iran. At the 2006 census, its population was 20, in 4 families.
