= Abadan-e Hoseyni =

Abadan-e Hoseyni آبادان حسینی
- Village
- Country: Iran
- Province: Kerman
- County: Shahr-e Babak
- Bakhsh: Central
- Rural District: Khursand

Population (2006)
  - Total: 59
- Time zone: UTC+3:30 (IRST)
  - Summer (DST): UTC+4:30 (IRDT)

Abadan-e Hoseyni (Persian: آبادان حسینی, also Romanized as Abādān-e Ḩoseynī) is a village in Khursand Rural District, in the Central District of Shahr-e Babak County, Kerman province, Iran. At the 2006 census, its population was 59, in 12 families.
