= Bon La =

Bon La بن لا
- Village
- Location within Iran
- Coordinates: 30°14′29″N 55°21′44″E
- Country: Iran
- Province: Kerman
- County: Shahr-e Babak
- Bakhsh: Central
- Rural District: Meymand

Population (2006)
  - Total: 10
- Time zone: UTC+3:30 (IRST)
  - Summer (DST): UTC+4:30 (IRDT)

Bon La (Persian: بن لا, also Romanized as Bon Lā) is a village in Meymand Rural District, in the Central District of Shahr-e Babak County, Kerman Province, Iran. At the 2006 census, its population was 10, in 5 families.
