= Mohammadabad-e Seyyedha =

Mohammadabad-e Seyyedha محمدابادسيدها
- Village
- Location within Iran
- Coordinates: 30°05′34″N 55°09′24″E
- Country: Iran
- Province: Kerman
- County: Shahr-e Babak
- Bakhsh: Central
- Rural District: Khatunabad

Population (2006)
  - Total: 31
- Time zone: UTC+3:30 (IRST)
  - Summer (DST): UTC+4:30 (IRDT)

Mohammadabad-e Seyyedha (Persian: محمدابادسيدها, also romanized as Moḩammadābād-e Seyyedhā; also known as Moḩammadābād, Moḩammadābād-e Sādāt, and Moḩammadābād-e Seyyedān) is a village in Khatunabad Rural District, in the Central District of Shahr-e Babak County, Kerman Province, Iran. At the 2006 census, its population was 31, in 6 families.
