= Bagh Sukhteh =

Bagh Sukhteh باغ سوخته
- Village
- Location within Iran
- Coordinates: 30°19′06″N 55°24′00″E
- Country: Iran
- Province: Kerman
- County: Shahr-e Babak
- Bakhsh: Central
- Rural District: Pa Qaleh

Population (2006)
  - Total: 46
- Time zone: UTC+3:30 (IRST)
  - Summer (DST): UTC+4:30 (IRDT)

Bagh Sukhteh (Persian: باغ سوخته, also Romanized as Bāgh Sūkhteh) is a village in Pa Qaleh Rural District, in the Central District of Shahr-e Babak County, Kerman Province, Iran. At the 2006 census, its population was 46, in 10 families.
