= Sarchinu Pain =

Sarchinu Pain سرچينوپايين
- Village
- Location within Iran
- Coordinates: 30°26′13″N 55°18′50″E
- Country: Iran
- Province: Kerman
- County: Shahr-e Babak
- Bakhsh: Central
- Rural District: Madvarat

Population (2006)
  - Total: 50
- Time zone: UTC+3:30 (IRST)
  - Summer (DST): UTC+4:30 (IRDT)

Sarchinu Pain (Persian: سرچينوپايين, also Romanized as Sarchīnū Pā’īn; also known as Sarchīnū Soflá) is a village in Madvarat Rural District, in the Central District of Shahr-e Babak County, Kerman Province, Iran. At the 2006 census, its population was 50, in 14 families.
