= Mowruiyeh =

Mowruiyeh or Muruiyeh or Moorooeyeh (Persian: موروئيه) may refer to:

- Mowruiyeh, Jiroft
- Muruiyeh, Shahr-e Babak
- Muruiyeh, Zarand
