= Pakash =

Pakash پاكش
- Village
- Location within Iran
- Coordinates: 30°22′51″N 55°24′58″E
- Country: Iran
- Province: Kerman
- County: Rafsanjan
- Bakhsh: Koshkuiyeh
- Rural District: Raviz

Population (2006)
  - Total: 127
- Time zone: UTC+3:30 (IRST)
  - Summer (DST): UTC+4:30 (IRDT)

Pakash (Persian: پاكش, also Romanized as Pākash) is a village in Raviz Rural District, Koshkuiyeh District, Rafsanjan County, Kerman Province, Iran. At the 2006 census, its population was 127, in 26 families.
