= Kahn-e Razan =

Kahn-e Razan كهن رزان
- Village
- Location within Iran
- Coordinates: 30°24′17″N 55°23′41″E
- Country: Iran
- Province: Kerman
- County: Rafsanjan
- Bakhsh: Koshkuiyeh
- Rural District: Raviz

Population (2006)
  - Total: 17
- Time zone: UTC+3:30 (IRST)
  - Summer (DST): UTC+4:30 (IRDT)

Kahn-e Razan (Persian: كهن رزان, also Romanized as Kahn-e Razān; also known as Kahn-e Zarān) is a village in Raviz Rural District, Koshkuiyeh District, Rafsanjan County, Kerman Province, Iran. At the 2006 census, its population was 17, in 7 families.
