= Zahruiyeh =

Zahruiyeh زهروييه
- Village
- Location within Iran
- Coordinates: 30°21′44″N 55°24′39″E
- Country: Iran
- Province: Kerman
- County: Rafsanjan
- Bakhsh: Koshkuiyeh
- Rural District: Raviz

Population (2006)
  - Total: 17
- Time zone: UTC+3:30 (IRST)
  - Summer (DST): UTC+4:30 (IRDT)

Zahruiyeh (Persian: زهروييه, also Romanized as Zahrū’īyeh) is a village in Raviz Rural District, Koshkuiyeh District, Rafsanjan County, Kerman Province, Iran. At the 2006 census, its population was 17, in 4 families.
