= Gez Boland =

Gez Boland or Gaz Boland (Persian: گزبلند) may refer to:

- Gez Boland, Bushehr
- Gez Boland, Fars
- Gaz Boland, Shahr-e Babak, Kerman Province
- Gaz Boland, Dehaj, Shahr-e Babak County, Kerman Province
