= Masinan =

Village in Kerman province, Iran

Masinan Persian: مسينان
- Village
- Location within Iran
- Coordinates: 30°24′18″N 55°18′08″E
- Country: Iran
- Province: Kerman
- County: Shahr-e Babak
- District: Central
- Rural District: Madvarat

Population (2016)
  - Total: 257
- Time zone: UTC+3:30 (IRST)

Masinan (Persian: مسينان) (Note: Also romanized as Masīnān) is a village in Madvarat Rural District of the Central District of Shahr-e Babak County, Kerman province, Iran.

== Demographics ==
=== Population ===
At the time of the 2006 National Census, the village's population was 266 in 71 households. The following census in 2011 counted 156 people in 48 households. The 2016 census measured the population of the village as 257 people in 83 households. It was the most populous village in its rural district.
