= Nurabad, Rafsanjan =

Nurabad نوراباد
- Village
- Location within Iran
- Coordinates: 30°32′53″N 55°39′29″E
- Country: Iran
- Province: Kerman
- County: Rafsanjan
- Bakhsh: Koshkuiyeh
- Rural District: Koshkuiyeh

Population (2006)
  - Total: 309
- Time zone: UTC+3:30 (IRST)
  - Summer (DST): UTC+4:30 (IRDT)

Nurabad (Persian: نوراباد, also Romanized as Nūrābād; also known as Noor Abad Kashgoo‘eyeh and Nūrābād-e Kashkū’īyeh) is a village in Koshkuiyeh Rural District, Koshkuiyeh District, Rafsanjan County, Kerman Province, Iran. At the 2006 census, its population was 309, in 68 families.
