= Marj, Iran =

Village in Kerman province, Iran

Marj Persian: مرج
- Village
- Location within Iran
- Coordinates: 30°16′03″N 55°26′57″E
- Country: Iran
- Province: Kerman
- County: Shahr-e Babak
- District: Central
- Rural District: Pa Qaleh

Population (2016)
  - Total: 554
- Time zone: UTC+3:30 (IRST)

Marj (Persian: مرج) (Note: Also known as Marj Pāqal‘eh) is a village in, and the capital of, Pa Qaleh Rural District of the Central District of Shahr-e Babak County, Kerman province, Iran.

== Demographics ==
=== Population ===
At the time of the 2006 National Census, the village's population was 187 in 53 households. The following census in 2011 counted 360 people in 119 households. The 2016 census measured the population of the village as 554 people in 171 households. It was the most populous village in its rural district.
