= Amrduiyeh =

Amrduiyeh امردوييه
- Village
- Location within Iran
- Coordinates: 30°17′28″N 55°18′06″E
- Country: Iran
- Province: Kerman
- County: Shahr-e Babak
- Bakhsh: Central
- Rural District: Meymand

Population (2006)
  - Total: 322
- Time zone: UTC+3:30 (IRST)
  - Summer (DST): UTC+4:30 (IRDT)

Amrduiyeh (Persian: امردوييه, also Romanized as Amrdū’īyeh and Amrodū’īyeh; also known as Amrūdū’īyeh and Hūrmedū) is a village in Meymand Rural District, in the Central District of Shahr-e Babak County, Kerman Province, Iran. At the 2006 census, its population was 322, in 73 families.
