= Nimjerduiyeh =

Nimjerduiyeh نيمجردوييه
- Village
- Location within Iran
- Coordinates: 30°21′42″N 55°24′26″E
- Country: Iran
- Province: Kerman
- County: Rafsanjan
- Bakhsh: Koshkuiyeh
- Rural District: Raviz

Population (2006)
  - Total: 97
- Time zone: UTC+3:30 (IRST)
  - Summer (DST): UTC+4:30 (IRDT)

Nimjerduiyeh (Persian: نيمجردوييه, also Romanized as Nīmjerdū’īyeh; also known as Namak Rūd, Nīmjerd, and Nīmkurd) is a village in Raviz Rural District, Koshkuiyeh District, Rafsanjan County, Kerman Province, Iran. At the 2006 census, its population was 97, in 27 families.
