= Doqondar =

Doqondar دغندر
- Village
- Location within Iran
- Coordinates: 30°24′45″N 55°19′13″E
- Country: Iran
- Province: Kerman
- County: Shahr-e Babak
- Bakhsh: Central
- Rural District: Madvarat

Population (2006)
  - Total: 186
- Time zone: UTC+3:30 (IRST)
  - Summer (DST): UTC+4:30 (IRDT)

Doqondar (Persian: دغندر, also Romanized as Doqandar and Do Qondor; also known as Doghondar, Dowjāndār, Dūgandar, and Dūghandar) is a village in Madvarat Rural District, in the Central District of Shahr-e Babak County, Kerman Province, Iran. At the 2006 census, its population was 186, in 53 families.
