= Difeh Aqa =

Difeh Aqa ديفه اقا
- Village
- Location within Iran
- Coordinates: 30°28′28″N 55°42′35″E
- Country: Iran
- Province: Kerman
- County: Rafsanjan
- Bakhsh: Koshkuiyeh
- Rural District: Koshkuiyeh

Population (2006)
  - Total: 657
- Time zone: UTC+3:30 (IRST)
  - Summer (DST): UTC+4:30 (IRDT)

Difeh Aqa (Persian: ديفه اقا, also Romanized as Dīfeh Āqā; also known as Daf‘eh, Da’feh Āqā, Da’feh Raẕavī, and Da’feh-ye Āqā) is a village in Koshkuiyeh Rural District, Koshkuiyeh District, Rafsanjan County, Kerman Province, Iran. At the 2006 census, its population was 657, in 157 families.
