= Kushkuiyeh =

Kushkuiyeh or Kushkuyeh (Persian: كوشكوئيه) may refer to:

- Kushkuiyeh, Isfahan
- Kushkuiyeh, Kerman
- Kushkuiyeh, Zarand, Kerman Province

== See also ==
- Kashkuiyeh (disambiguation)
