= Mahjerd =

Mahjerd مهجرد
- Village
- Location within Iran
- Coordinates: 30°21′48″N 55°25′51″E
- Country: Iran
- Province: Kerman
- County: Rafsanjan
- Bakhsh: Koshkuiyeh
- Rural District: Raviz

Population (2006)
  - Total: 14
- Time zone: UTC+3:30 (IRST)
  - Summer (DST): UTC+4:30 (IRDT)

Mahjerd (Persian: مهجرد; also known as Mahjerdū’īyeh and Mehjerdī) is a village in Raviz Rural District, Koshkuiyeh District, Rafsanjan County, Kerman Province, Iran. At the 2006 census, its population was 14, in 5 families.
