= Dam-e Bahayi =

Dam-e Bahayi دام بهايي
- Village
- Country: Iran
- Province: Kerman
- County: Rafsanjan
- Bakhsh: Koshkuiyeh
- Rural District: Raviz

Population (2006)
  - Total: 10
- Time zone: UTC+3:30 (IRST)
  - Summer (DST): UTC+4:30 (IRDT)

Dam-e Bahayi (Persian: دام بهايي, also Romanized as Dām-e Bahāyī) is a village in Raviz Rural District, Koshkuiyeh District, Rafsanjan County, Kerman Province, Iran. At the 2006 census, its population was 10, in 4 families.
