= Manzelabad, Kerman =

Manzelabad منزل اباد
- Village
- Location within Iran
- Coordinates: 30°04′03″N 54°46′12″E
- Country: Iran
- Province: Kerman
- County: Shahr-e Babak
- Bakhsh: Central
- Rural District: Khursand

Population (2006)
  - Total: 195
- Time zone: UTC+3:30 (IRST)
  - Summer (DST): UTC+4:30 (IRDT)

Manzelabad (Persian: منزل اباد, also Romanized as Manzelābād; also known as Manzilābād) is a village in Khursand Rural District, in the Central District of Shahr-e Babak County, Kerman Province, Iran. At the 2006 census, its population was 195, in 49 families.
