= Gelab, Kerman =

Gelab گلاب
- Village
- Location within Iran
- Coordinates: 30°13′33″N 55°26′16″E
- Country: Iran
- Province: Kerman
- County: Shahr-e Babak
- Bakhsh: Central
- Rural District: Meymand

Population (2006)
  - Total: 166
- Time zone: UTC+3:30 (IRST)
  - Summer (DST): UTC+4:30 (IRDT)

Gelab (Persian: گلاب, also Romanized as Gelāb, Galāb, and Golāb; also known as Qal‘eh Golāb) is a village in Meymand Rural District, in the Central District of Shahr-e Babak County, Kerman Province, Iran. At the 2006 census, its population was 166, in 40 families.
