= Manzelabad =

Manzelabad (Persian: منزل اباد) may refer to:

- Manzelabad, Ardabil
- Manzelabad, Kerman
- Manzelabad, Razavi Khorasan
