= Dastuiyeh =

Dastuiyeh دستوييه
- Village
- Location within Iran
- Coordinates: 30°21′28″N 55°24′23″E
- Country: Iran
- Province: Kerman
- County: Rafsanjan
- Bakhsh: Koshkuiyeh
- Rural District: Raviz

Population (2006)
  - Total: 36
- Time zone: UTC+3:30 (IRST)
  - Summer (DST): UTC+4:30 (IRDT)

Dastuiyeh (Persian: دستوييه, also Romanized as Dastū’īyeh) is a village in Raviz Rural District, Koshkuiyeh District, Rafsanjan County, Kerman Province, Iran. At the 2006 census, its population was 36, in 9 families.
