= Rustai-ye Abbas Aba =

Rustai-ye Abbas Aba روستاي عباس ابا
- Village
- Country: Iran
- Province: Kerman
- County: Rafsanjan
- Bakhsh: Koshkuiyeh
- Rural District: Koshkuiyeh

Population (2006)
  - Total: 473
- Time zone: UTC+3:30 (IRST)
  - Summer (DST): UTC+4:30 (IRDT)

Rustai-ye Abbas Aba (Persian: روستاي عباس ابا, also Romanized as Rūstāī-ye ʿAbbās Ābā) is a village in Koshkuiyeh Rural District, Koshkuiyeh District, Rafsanjan County, Kerman Province, Iran. At the 2006 census, its population was 473, in 110 families.
