= Dar Ab =

Dar Ab or Dar-e Ab or Derab (Persian: دراب) may refer to:

- Derab, East Azerbaijan
- Dar Ab, Javar, Kerman Province
- Dar Ab, Sistan and Baluchestan

== See also ==
- Ab Dar (disambiguation)
