= Gaz Boland, Shahr-e Babak =

Gaz Boland گزبلند
- Village
- Location within Iran
- Coordinates: 30°12′31″N 55°33′04″E
- Country: Iran
- Province: Kerman
- County: Shahr-e Babak
- Bakhsh: Central
- Rural District: Pa Qaleh

Population (2006)
  - Total: 43
- Time zone: UTC+3:30 (IRST)
  - Summer (DST): UTC+4:30 (IRDT)

Gaz Boland (Persian: گزبلند) is a village in Pa Qaleh Rural District, in the Central District of Shahr-e Babak County, Kerman Province, Iran. At the 2006 census, its population was 43, in 9 families.
