= Sarchinu Bala =

Sarchinu Bala سرچينوبالا
- Village
- Location within Iran
- Coordinates: 30°25′58″N 55°18′01″E
- Country: Iran
- Province: Kerman
- County: Shahr-e Babak
- Bakhsh: Central
- Rural District: Madvarat

Population (2006)
  - Total: 45
- Time zone: UTC+3:30 (IRST)
  - Summer (DST): UTC+4:30 (IRDT)

Sarchinu Bala (Persian: سرچينوبالا, also Romanized as Sarchīnū Bālā; also known as Sarchīnū-ye ‘Olyā) is a village in Madvarat Rural District, in the Central District of Shahr-e Babak County, Kerman Province, Iran. At the 2006 census, its population was 45, in 13 families.
