= Kamarusak =

Kamarusak or Kam Arusak (Persian: كم عروسك) may refer to:

- Kamarusak-e Bala
- Kamarusak-e Pain
