= Andera-ye Olya =

Andera-ye Olya اندراعليا
- Village
- Location within Iran
- Coordinates: 30°28′24″N 55°17′26″E
- Country: Iran
- Province: Kerman
- County: Shahr-e Babak
- Bakhsh: Central
- Rural District: Madvarat

Population (2006)
  - Total: 144
- Time zone: UTC+3:30 (IRST)
  - Summer (DST): UTC+4:30 (IRDT)

Andera-ye Olya (Persian: اندراعليا, also Romanized as Anderā-ye ‘Olyā; also known as Andarā, Andarā’, Anderā, and Indru) is a village in Madvarat Rural District, in the Central District of Shahr-e Babak County, Kerman Province, Iran. At the 2006 census, its population was 144, in 39 families.
