= Sarchinu =

Sarchinu (Persian: سرچينو) may refer to:

- Sarchinu Bala
- Sarchinu Pain
