= Kam-e Sorkh =

Village in Kerman province, Iran

Kam-e Sorkh Persian: كم سرخ
- Village
- Location within Iran
- Coordinates: 30°21′16″N 55°08′53″E
- Country: Iran
- Province: Kerman
- County: Shahr-e Babak
- District: Central
- Rural District: Madvarat

Population (2016)
  - Total: 98
- Time zone: UTC+3:30 (IRST)

Kam-e Sorkh (Persian: كم سرخ) (Note: Also romanized as Kamsorkh) is a village in, and the capital of, Madvarat Rural District of the Central District of Shahr-e Babak County, Kerman province, Iran.

== Demographics ==
=== Population ===
At the time of the 2006 National Census, the village's population was 266 in 78 households. The following census in 2011 counted 187 people in 62 households. The 2016 census measured the population of the village as 98 people in 43 households.
