= Deh-e Qazi-ye Yek =

Deh-e Qazi-ye Yek ده قاضي1
- Village
- Location within Iran
- Coordinates: 30°24′35″N 55°17′59″E
- Country: Iran
- Province: Kerman
- County: Shahr-e Babak
- Bakhsh: Central
- Rural District: Madvarat

Population (2006)
  - Total: 32
- Time zone: UTC+3:30 (IRST)
  - Summer (DST): UTC+4:30 (IRDT)

Deh-e Qazi-ye Yek (Persian: ده قاضي1, also Romanized as Deh-e Qāẕī-ye Yek; also known as Deh-e Kāfī and Deh-e Qāẕī) is a village in Madvarat Rural District, in the Central District of Shahr-e Babak County, Kerman Province, Iran. At the 2006 census, its population was 32, in 7 families.
