= Kushku =

Kushku may refer to:

- Kushku, Fars, the village in Fars Province
- Kushku, Isfahan, the village in Isfahan Province
- Kushku, Kerman, the city in Kerman Province
