= Rashvan =

Rashvan رشوان
- Village
- Location within Iran
- Coordinates: 30°22′10″N 55°26′36″E
- Country: Iran
- Province: Kerman
- County: Rafsanjan
- Bakhsh: Koshkuiyeh
- Rural District: Raviz

Population (2006)
  - Total: 40
- Time zone: UTC+3:30 (IRST)
  - Summer (DST): UTC+4:30 (IRDT)

Rashvan (Persian: رشوان, also Romanized as Rashvān) is a village in Raviz Rural District, Koshkuiyeh District, Rafsanjan County, Kerman Province, Iran. At the 2006 census, its population was 40, in 12 families.

== See also ==
- Rashwan, Egyptian surname
