= Kamarusak-e Pain =

Kamarusak-e Pain كم عروسك پايين
- Village
- Location within Iran
- Coordinates: 30°26′45″N 55°20′09″E
- Country: Iran
- Province: Kerman
- County: Shahr-e Babak
- Bakhsh: Central
- Rural District: Madvarat

Population (2006)
  - Total: 41
- Time zone: UTC+3:30 (IRST)
  - Summer (DST): UTC+4:30 (IRDT)

Kamarusak-e Pain (Persian: كم عروسك پايين, also Romanized as Kam‘arūsak-e Pā’īn; also known as Kam ‘Arūsak-e Soflá) is a village in Madvarat Rural District, in the Central District of Shahr-e Babak County, Kerman Province, Iran. At the 2006 census, its population was 41, in 11 families.
