= Zangiabad (disambiguation) =

Zangiabad is a city in Kerman Province, Iran.

Zangiabad or Zengiabad (Persian: زنگي اباد) may also refer to various places in Iran:

- Zangiabad, East Azerbaijan
- Zangiabad, Fars
- Zangiabad, Shahr-e Babak, Kerman Province
- Zangiabad, South Khorasan
- Zangiabad, West Azerbaijan
- Zangiabad Rural District, in Kerman Province
