= Meymand, Kerman =

Village in Kerman province, Iran

Meymand Persian: ميمند
- Village
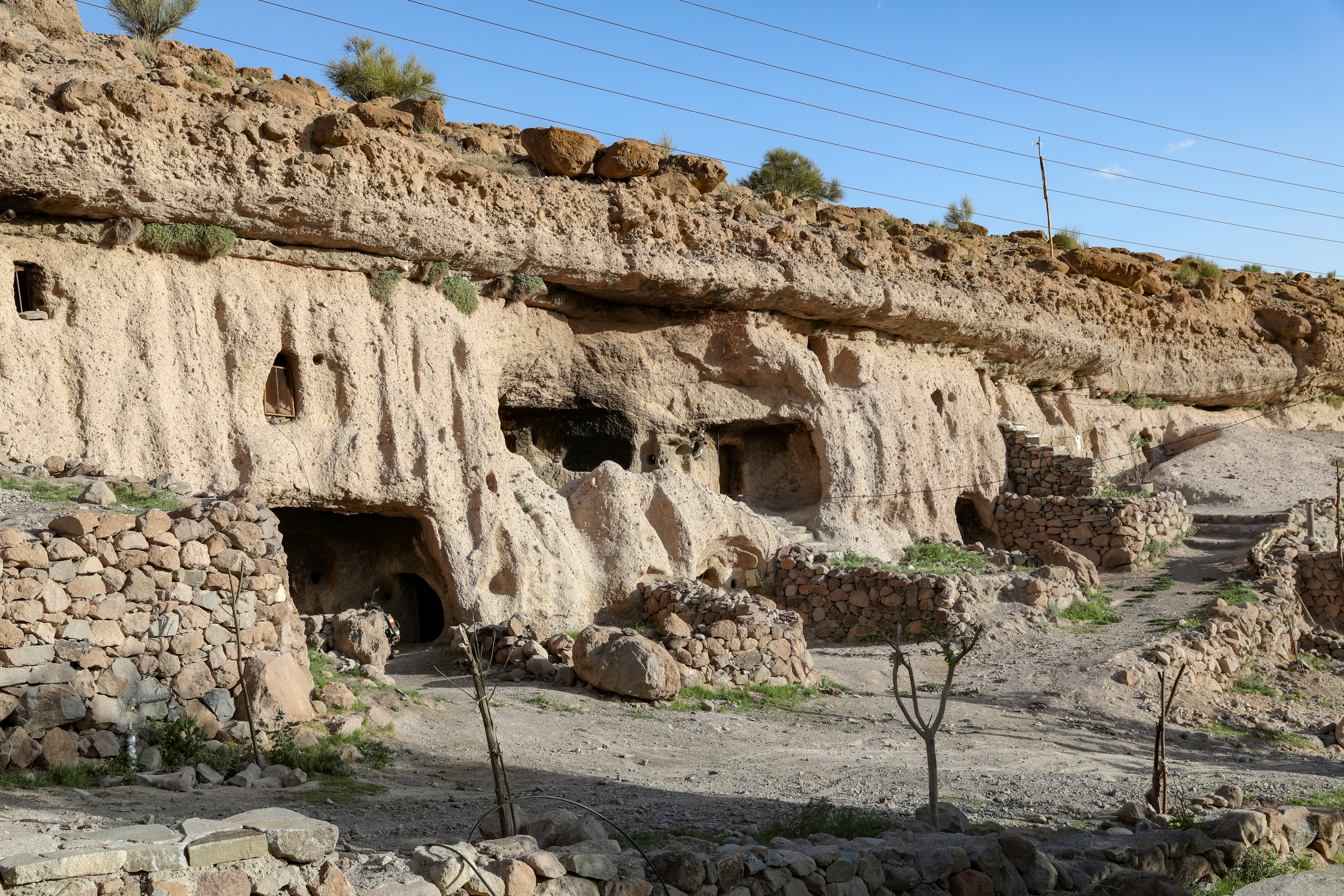

- Location within Iran
- Coordinates: 30°13′46″N 55°22′32″E
- Country: Iran
- Province: Kerman
- County: Shahr-e Babak
- District: Central
- Rural District: Meymand

Population (2016)
  - Total: 105
- Time zone: UTC+3:30 (IRST)

UNESCO World Heritage Site
- Official name: Cultural Landscape of Maymand
- Criteria: Cultural: (v)
- Reference: 1423rev
- Inscription: 2015 (39th Session)
- Area: 4,953.85 ha (12,241.2 acres)
- Buffer zone: 7,024.65 ha (17,358.3 acres)

Meymand (Persian: ميمند) (Note: Also romanized as Maimand, Maymand, and Meimand) is a village in, and the capital of, Meymand Rural District of the Central District of Shahr-e Babak County, Kerman province, Iran.

== Demographics ==
=== Population ===
At the time of the 2006 National Census, the village's population was 674 in 181 households. The following census in 2011 counted 214 people in 74 households. The 2016 census measured the population of the village as 105 people in 44 households.

== Overview ==
Living conditions in Meymhand are harsh due to the aridity of the land and to high temperatures in summers and very cold winters. The local language contains many words from the ancient Sassanid and Pahlavi languages.

In 2005, Meymand was awarded the UNESCO-Green Melina Mercouri International Prize for the Safeguarding and Management of Cultural Landscapes (about $20,000).

On 4 July 2015, the village was added to the UNESCO World Heritage Sites list.

Maymand and its unique position in cultural heritage has been described by Rihanna Ebrahimi, "What makes Maymand specific in the domain of critical heritage studies".

== See also ==
Media related to Maymand at Wikimedia Commons
