= Aliabad-e Sadat =

Aliabad-e Sadat (Persian: علي ابادسادات) may refer to:

- Aliabad-e Sadat, Anbarabad
- Aliabad-e Sadat, Rafsanjan
