= Shahr-e Babak =

City in Kerman province, Iran

Shahr-e Babak Persian: شهربابك
- City
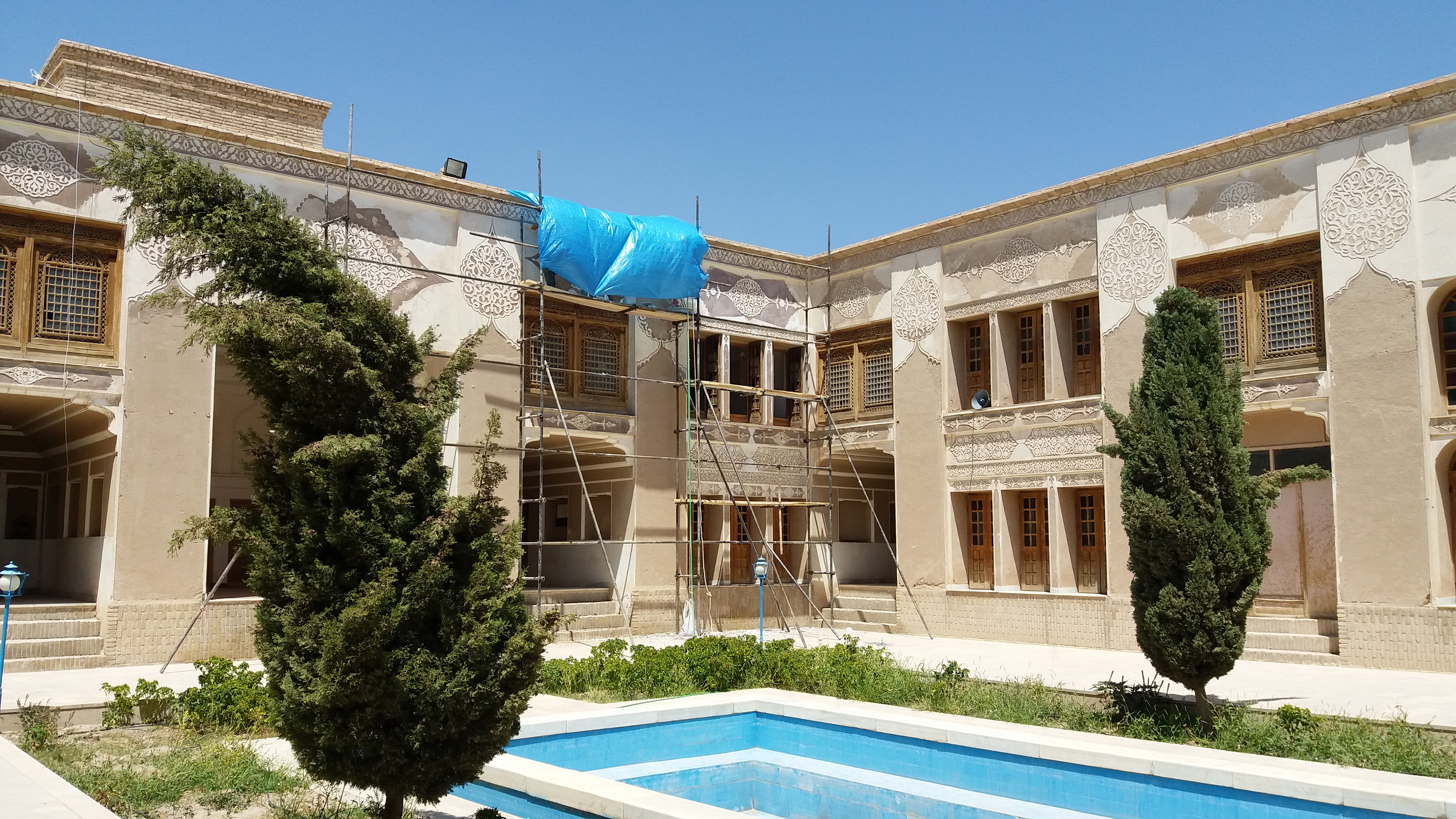
- Mosakhani Building

- Location within Iran
- Coordinates: 30°07′17″N 55°07′22″E
- Country: Iran
- Province: Kerman
- County: Shahr-e Babak
- District: Central

Population (2016)
  - Total: 51,620
- Time zone: UTC+3:30 (IRST)

Shahr-e Babak (Persian: شهر بابک) (Note: Also romanized as Shahr Bābak, Shahr-e Bābak, and Shahr-i-Bābak) is a city in the Central District of Shahr-e Babak County, Kerman province, Iran, serving as capital of both the county and the district.

== Climate ==
Climate data for Shahr Babak (elevation: 1,834.1 m (6,017 ft), 1987-2010)
Month	Jan	Feb	Mar	Apr	May	Jun	Jul	Aug	Sep	Oct	Nov	Dec	Year
Record high °C (°F)	19.6 (67.3)	22.8 (73.0)	29.0 (84.2)	30.6 (87.1)	36.0 (96.8)	39.0 (102.2)	40.4 (104.7)	39.4 (102.9)	37.4 (99.3)	30.8 (87.4)	25.4 (77.7)	24.4 (75.9)	40.4 (104.7)
Mean daily maximum °C (°F)	10.4 (50.7)	13.0 (55.4)	16.8 (62.2)	22.9 (73.2)	28.8 (83.8)	33.8 (92.8)	35.4 (95.7)	34.4 (93.9)	31.2 (88.2)	25.0 (77.0)	18.3 (64.9)	13.4 (56.1)	23.6 (74.5)
Daily mean °C (°F)	3.3 (37.9)	5.8 (42.4)	9.7 (49.5)	14.7 (58.5)	19.9 (67.8)	24.8 (76.6)	27.5 (81.5)	25.7 (78.3)	21.7 (71.1)	15.7 (60.3)	9.5 (49.1)	5.6 (42.1)	15.3 (59.6)
Mean daily minimum °C (°F)	−3.6 (25.5)	−2.1 (28.2)	2.0 (35.6)	6.3 (43.3)	10.4 (50.7)	15.3 (59.5)	19.2 (66.6)	17.2 (63.0)	12.3 (54.1)	6.1 (43.0)	0.8 (33.4)	−1.7 (28.9)	6.8 (44.3)
Record low °C (°F)	−17.8 (0.0)	−16.0 (3.2)	−11.0 (12.2)	−3.6 (25.5)	1.6 (34.9)	5.6 (42.1)	10.6 (51.1)	7.4 (45.3)	2.4 (36.3)	−6.0 (21.2)	−11.0 (12.2)	−16.6 (2.1)	−17.8 (0.0)
Average precipitation mm (inches)	33.3 (1.31)	24.8 (0.98)	29.6 (1.17)	16.6 (0.65)	5.5 (0.22)	0.4 (0.02)	0.4 (0.02)	0.6 (0.02)	0.1 (0.00)	2.2 (0.09)	6.4 (0.25)	26.8 (1.06)	146.7 (5.79)
Average relative humidity (%)	54	47	42	37	27	19	20	20	20	28	39	50	34
Source: Iran Meteorological Organization(max/min temperatures 1987-2005)

== Demographics ==
=== Population ===
At the time of the 2006 National Census, the city's population was 43,916 in 10,401 households. The following census in 2011 counted 45,256 people in 11,928 households. The 2016 census measured the population of the city as 51,620 people in 15,375 households.

== Overview ==
Shahr-e Babak is an ancient city in Iran. Historians believe this town was built by Ardeshir Babakan, the most famous Sasanian king, nearly 1,800 years ago. Meymand, one of the 4 oldest villages in Iran, is 36 km far from Shahr-e Babak. Sarcheshmeh and Miedook, the biggest copper mines in Iran, are located around this town.

Shahr-e Babak is located in the west part of the Kerman province, Iran. To its east is Rafsanjan, in its southern limits is Sirjan, and to the north and west has common borders with the province of Yazd. The city is one of the ancient cities of Iran, and its founder is said to be Babak (the father of Ardeshir Babakan). Such that ancient geographers have mentioned this city in their records, and others have related its historical past with that of Kerman.

Shahr-e Babak was ruled by Nizari Ismailis about 200 years ago. It is known as the "Land of Copper." The county has many villages namely, Eshkoor, Barfeh, Hesarooyeh, Sohrab, Estabraq, Riseh, Pah Qaleh, etc.

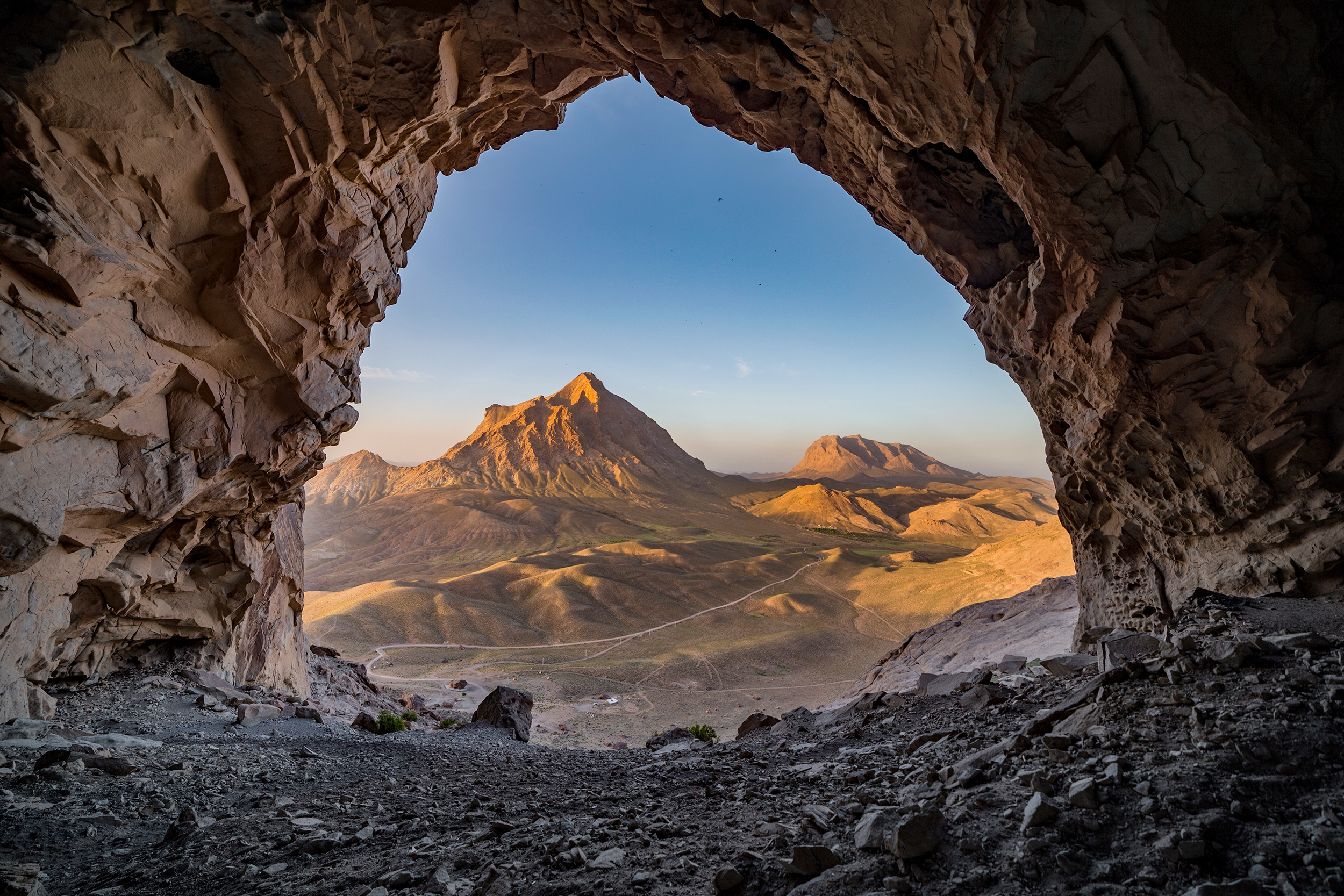
Ayyoub's (Job's) Cave, Shahr-e Babak, Iran

Ayyoub's (Job's) Cave is located near Dehaj.
