= Zarmeh =

Zarmeh زرمه
- Village
- Location within Iran
- Coordinates: 30°04′23″N 55°06′08″E
- Country: Iran
- Province: Kerman
- County: Shahr-e Babak
- Bakhsh: Central
- Rural District: Estabraq

Population (2006)
  - Total: 69
- Time zone: UTC+3:30 (IRST)
  - Summer (DST): UTC+4:30 (IRDT)

Zarmeh (Persian: زرمه; also known as Zara‘ and Z̄arreh) is a village in Estabraq Rural District, in the Central District of Shahr-e Babak County, Kerman Province, Iran. At the 2006 census, its population was 62, in 13 families.
