= Ahmadabad-e Difeh Khoshk =

Village in Kerman province, Iran

Ahmadabad-e Difeh Khoshk Persian: احمداباد ديفه خشك
- Village
- Location within Iran
- Coordinates: 30°27′58″N 55°39′41″E
- Country: Iran
- Province: Kerman
- County: Rafsanjan
- District: Koshkuiyeh
- Rural District: Koshkuiyeh

Population (2016)
  - Total: 1,862
- Time zone: UTC+3:30 (IRST)

Ahmadabad-e Difeh Khoshk (Persian: احمدابادديفه خشك) (Note: Also romanized as Aḩmadābād-e Dīfeh Khoshk; also known as Aḩmadābād and Aḩmadābād-e Da’feh) is a village in Koshkuiyeh Rural District of Koshkuiyeh District, Rafsanjan County, Kerman province, Iran.

== Demographics ==
=== Population ===
At the time of the 2006 National Census, the village's population was 1,518 in 392 households. The following census in 2011 counted 1,804 people in 477 households. The 2016 census measured the population of the village as 1,862 people in 519 households. It was the most populous village in its rural district.
