= Makhrage Lake =

Lake in Kerman, Iran

- Location within Iran
- Interactive map of Makhrage Lake
- Coordinates: 30°25′38″N 57°07′22″E
- Type: lake
- Primary inflows: rain
- Primary outflows: none
- Surface area: 1,500 hectares (3,700 acres)
- Settlements: Shahr-e Babak, Kerman province, Iran

Makhrage Lake (Persian: دریاچه‌ مخراج) also known as Makhrageh or Chah Zangar is a salt lake in the Shahr-e Babak city of Kerman province.

== Description ==
It covers an area of over 15 square kilometers and lies 3 kilometers southeast of Makhrageh. It is the largest natural mirror in Southeast Iran.

Lake is originally nourished by three rivers from Qantas' northern, western, and eastern regions; the lake now grapples with saltwater intrusion from a nearby saline source. Lake's water supply has undergone significant changes over time.

The Habib Allah Khani River offers the main source of freshwater, flowing seasonally and channeling cool water through a network of narrow ditches. Vital watercourse of the lake supports the ecosystem in surrounding areas.
