= Abdar Miyan =

Village in Kerman province, Iran

Abdar Miyan Persian: ابدرميان
- Village
- Location within Iran
- Coordinates: 30°15′18″N 55°17′27″E
- Country: Iran
- Province: Kerman
- County: Shahr-e Babak
- District: Central
- Rural District: Meymand

Population (2016)
  - Total: 291
- Time zone: UTC+3:30 (IRST)

Abdar Miyan (Persian: ابدرميان) (Note: Also romanized as Ābdar Mīyān and Ābdarmīān; also known as Ābdār and Ābdar) is a village in Meymand Rural District of the Central District of Shahr-e Babak County, Kerman province, Iran.

== Demographics ==
=== Population ===
At the time of the 2006 National Census, the village's population was 48 in 13 households. The following census in 2011 counted 231 people in 74 households. The 2016 census measured the population of the village as 291 people in 83 households. It was the most populous village in its rural district.
