= Andera =

Andera is a surname. Notable people with the surname include:

- Bobbi Andera (fl. 2025), American politician from South Dakota
- Leonard E. Andera (1934–2012), American politician from South Dakota

== See also ==
- Andera-ye Olya
