= Qaleh-ye Golab =

Qaleh-ye Golab (Persian: قلعه گلاب), also rendered as Qaleh-i-Gulab, may refer to:

- Qaleh-ye Golab, Kerman
- Qaleh-ye Golab, Kohgiluyeh and Boyer-Ahmad
