= Bandevan =

Bandevan بندوان
- Village
- Location within Iran
- Coordinates: 30°22′45″N 55°24′58″E
- Country: Iran
- Province: Kerman
- County: Rafsanjan
- Bakhsh: Koshkuiyeh
- Rural District: Raviz

Population (2006)
  - Total: 15
- Time zone: UTC+3:30 (IRST)
  - Summer (DST): UTC+4:30 (IRDT)

Bandevan (Persian: بندوان, also Romanized as Bandevān; also known as Bandebān) is a village in Raviz Rural District, Koshkuiyeh District, Rafsanjan County, Kerman Province, Iran. At the 2006 census, its population was 150, in 18 families.
