= Estahuiyeh =

Estahuiyeh اسطاهوييه
- Village
- Location within Iran
- Coordinates: 30°21′45″N 55°26′14″E
- Country: Iran
- Province: Kerman
- County: Rafsanjan
- Bakhsh: Koshkuiyeh
- Rural District: Raviz

Population (2006)
  - Total: 120
- Time zone: UTC+3:30 (IRST)
  - Summer (DST): UTC+4:30 (IRDT)

Estahuiyeh (Persian: اسطاهوييه, also Romanized as Estāhū’īyeh; also known as Estakhr, Estākhū’īyeh, Istahu, and Ostāhū’īyeh) is a village in Raviz Rural District, Koshkuiyeh District, Rafsanjan County, Kerman Province, Iran. At the 2006 census, its population was 120, in 34 families.
