= Muruiyeh, Shahr-e Babak =

Village in Kerman province, Iran

Muruiyeh Persian: موروئيه
- Village
- Location within Iran
- Coordinates: 30°07′23″N 55°05′44″E
- Country: Iran
- Province: Kerman
- County: Shahr-e Babak
- District: Central
- Rural District: Khursand

Population (2016)
  - Total: 1,469
- Time zone: UTC+3:30 (IRST)

Muruiyeh (Persian: موروئيه) (Note: Also romanized as Mowrū’īyeh and Mūrū’īyeh; also known as Mūreh) is a village in Khursand Rural District of the Central District of Shahr-e Babak County, Kerman province, Iran.

== Demographics ==
=== Population ===
At the time of the 2006 National Census, the village's population was 1,520 in 330 households. The following census in 2011 counted 1,102 people in 305 households. The 2016 census measured the population of the village as 1,469 people in 406 households. It was the most populous village in its rural district.
