= Maduk =

Maduk may refer to:

- Miduk, a village in Iran
- Maduk (musician) (born 1990), Dutch drum and bass producer/DJ
