= Gisheh =

Gisheh (Persian: گيشه) may refer to:

- Gisheh, Kerman
- Gisheh, South Khorasan
