= Behjatabad, Kerman =

Behjatabad بهجت آباد
- Village
- Location within Iran
- Coordinates: 30°32′30″N 55°43′14″E
- Country: Iran
- Province: Kerman
- County: Rafsanjan
- Bakhsh: Koshkuiyeh
- Rural District: Koshkuiyeh

Population (2006)
  - Total: 815
- Time zone: UTC+3:30 (IRST)
  - Summer (DST): UTC+4:30 (IRDT)

Behjatabad (Persian: بهجت آباد, also Romanized as Behjatābād) is a village in Koshkuiyeh Rural District, Koshkuiyeh District, Rafsanjan County, Kerman Province, Iran. At the 2006 census, its population was 815, in 183 families.
