= Aliabad-e Sadat, Rafsanjan =

Aliabad-e Sadat علي ابادسادات
- Village
- Location within Iran
- Coordinates: 30°33′04″N 55°37′18″E
- Country: Iran
- Province: Kerman
- County: Rafsanjan
- Bakhsh: Koshkuiyeh
- Rural District: Koshkuiyeh

Population (2006)
  - Total: 358
- Time zone: UTC+3:30 (IRST)
  - Summer (DST): UTC+4:30 (IRDT)

Aliabad-e Sadat (Persian: علي ابادسادات, also Romanized as ‘Alīābād-e Sādāt; also known as ‘Alīābād) is a village in Koshkuiyeh Rural District, Koshkuiyeh District, Rafsanjan County, Kerman Province, Iran. At the 2006 census, its population was 358, in 84 families.
