= Udar =

Udar may refer to:

- Udār, a village in East Azerbaijan Province, Iran
- Udar revolver, an experimental Russian revolver
- UDAR, Ukrainian political party Ukrainian Democratic Alliance for Reform
