= Sorkhan =

Sorkhan (Persian: سرخان) may refer to:

- Sorkhan, Arzuiyeh
- Sorkhan, Shahr-e Babak
