= Mousa Khani Mansion =

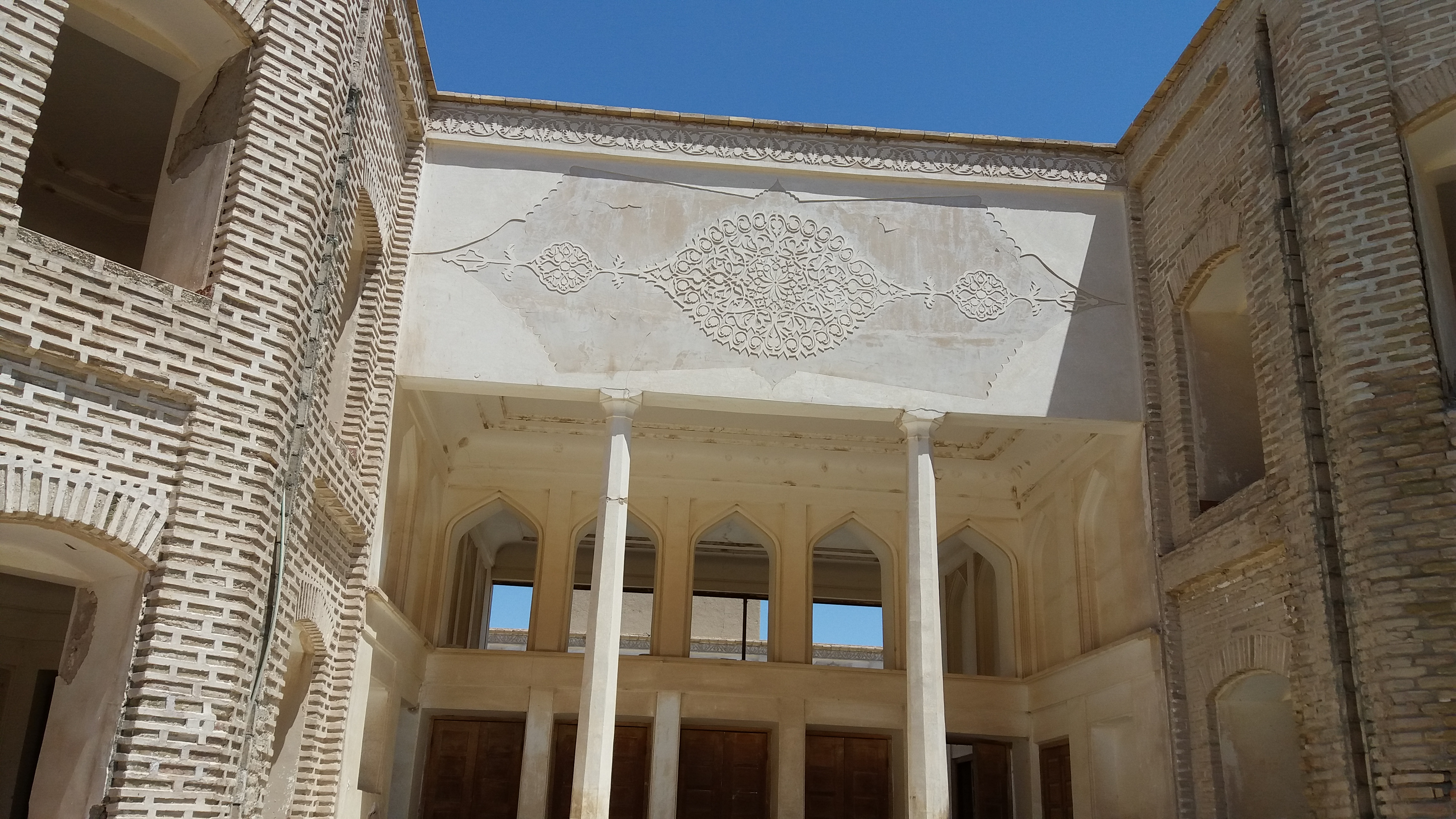
- Interactive map of Mousa Khani Mansion
- Location: Shahr-e Babak, Iran
- Area: Kerman
- Built: Qajar dynasty, 1871

Mousa Khani Mansion is located in Iran, in the city of Shahr-e Babak of Kerman province. It is one of the monuments dating to the Qajar era.

The building was constructed between 1886 and 1871. It covers an area of 7,500 square meters (2,300 square meters under the building, 5200 square meters of mansion garden). There are many endowments in the mansion.

The Mousa Khani building has been decorated inside and outside with gypsum in various parts. Materials used in the construction are raw clay and clay, straw, lime, gypsum, stone, wood and glass. The type of wood used in the doors and windows are of walnut wood while columns and pillars are made out of berry tree.

== The Building ==
The building is built on two floors and on three main sides:

Northern side, (winter) made duplex. I

Western side, (summer) The use of this side has been in the summer.

South side, (Spring) All rooms and its main porch overlook the large garden and its smaller garden inside.

== Gallery ==
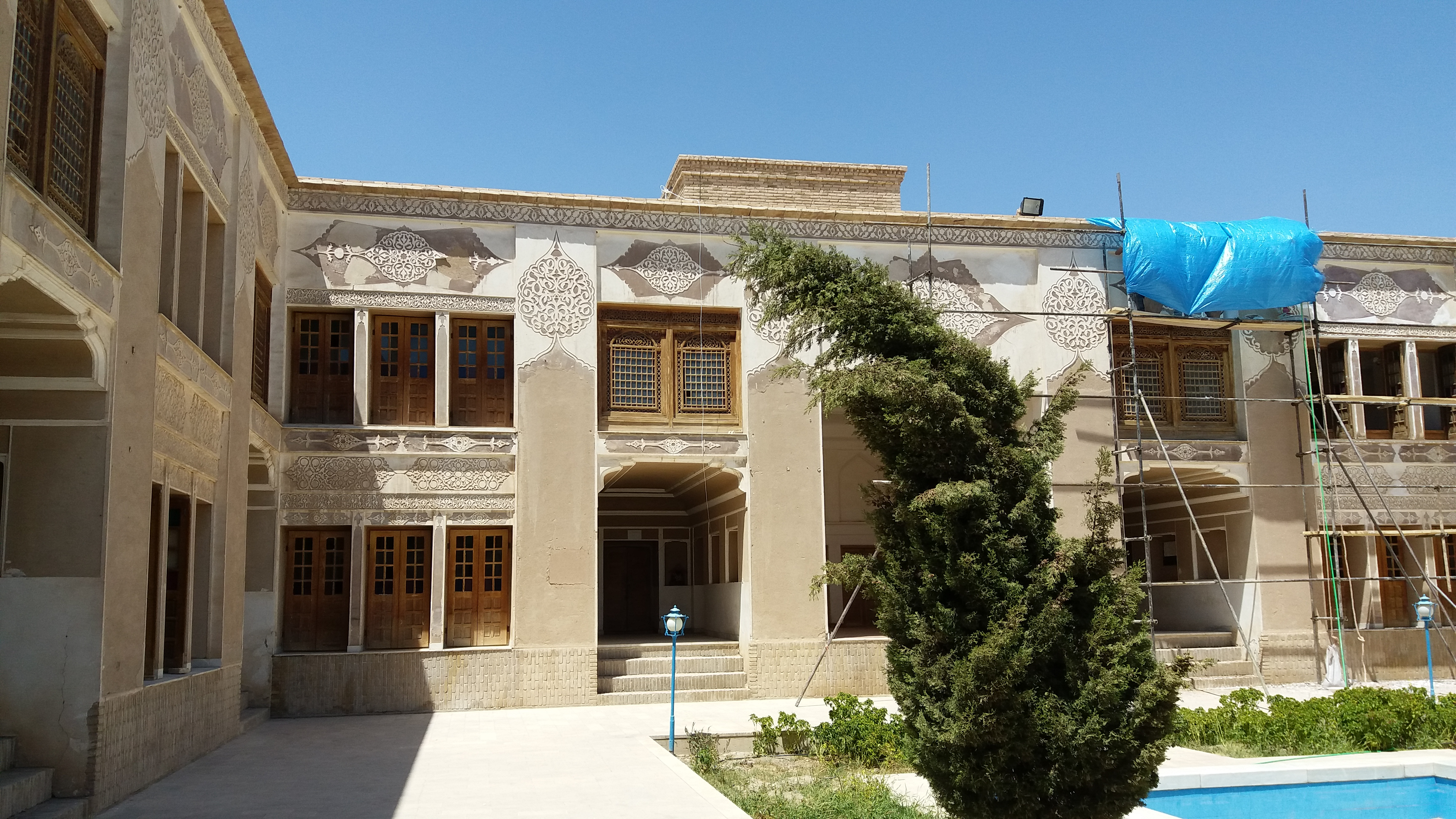
Mousa Khani Mansion

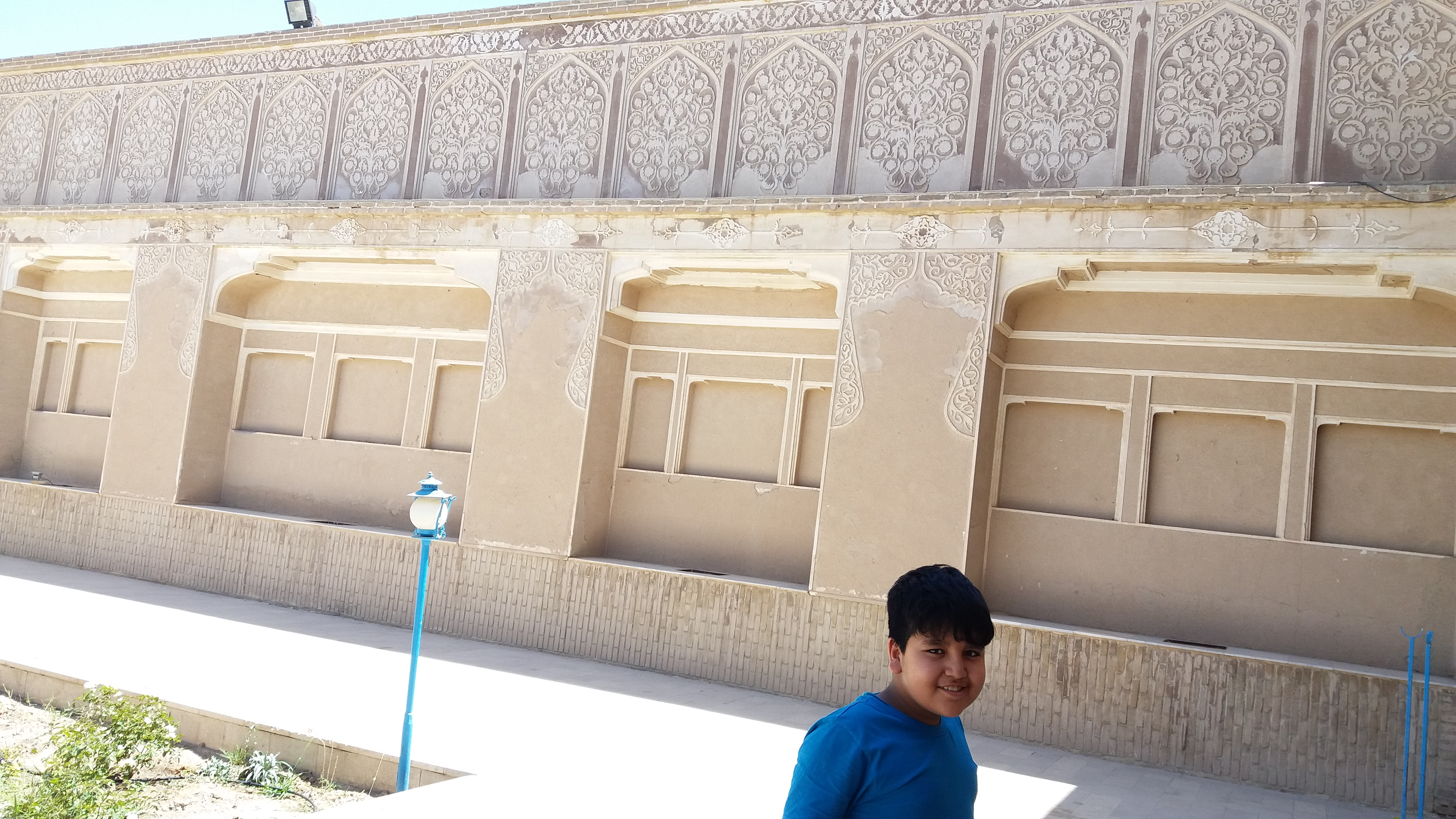
Mousa Khani Mansion

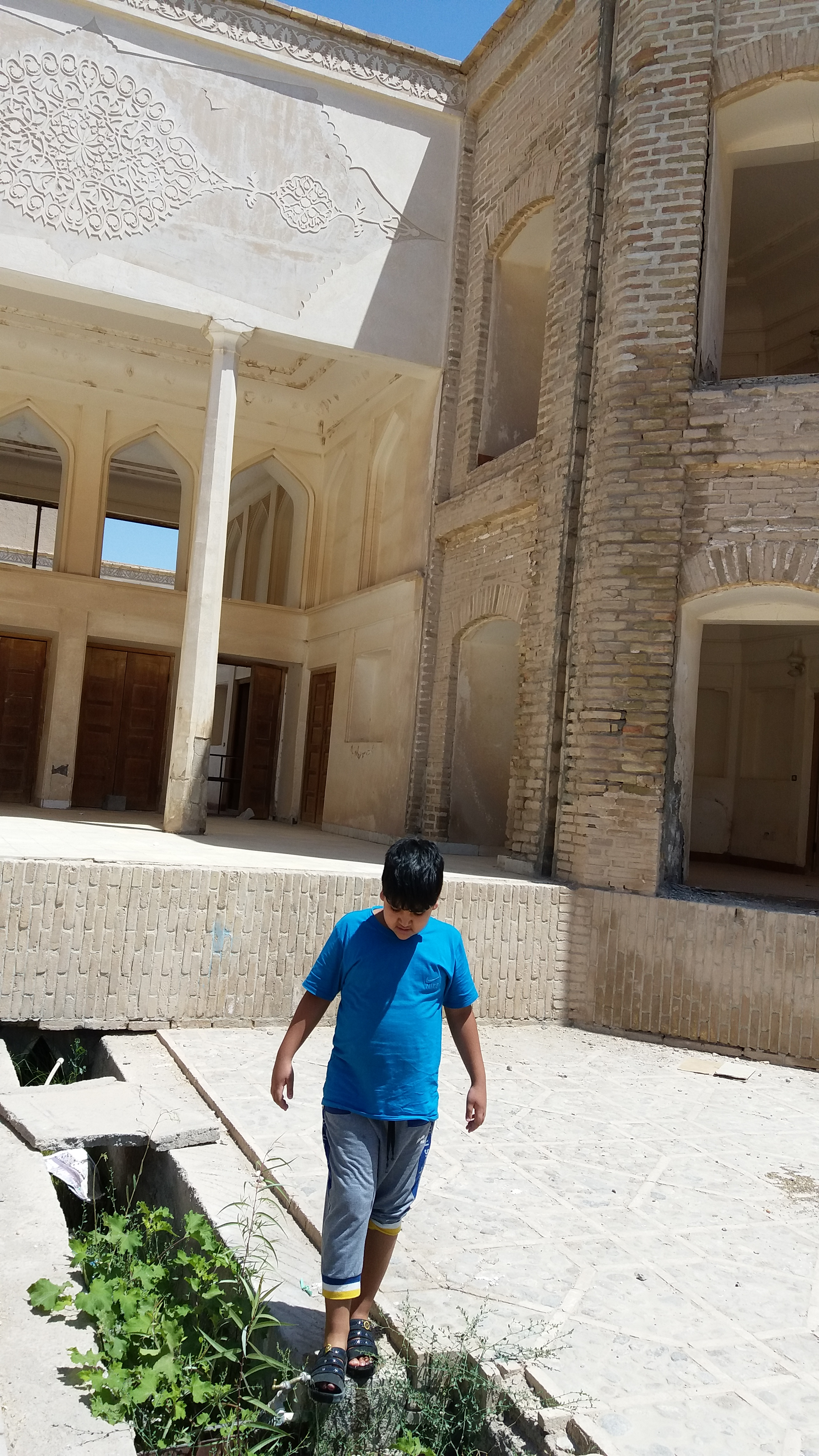
Mousa Khani Mansion

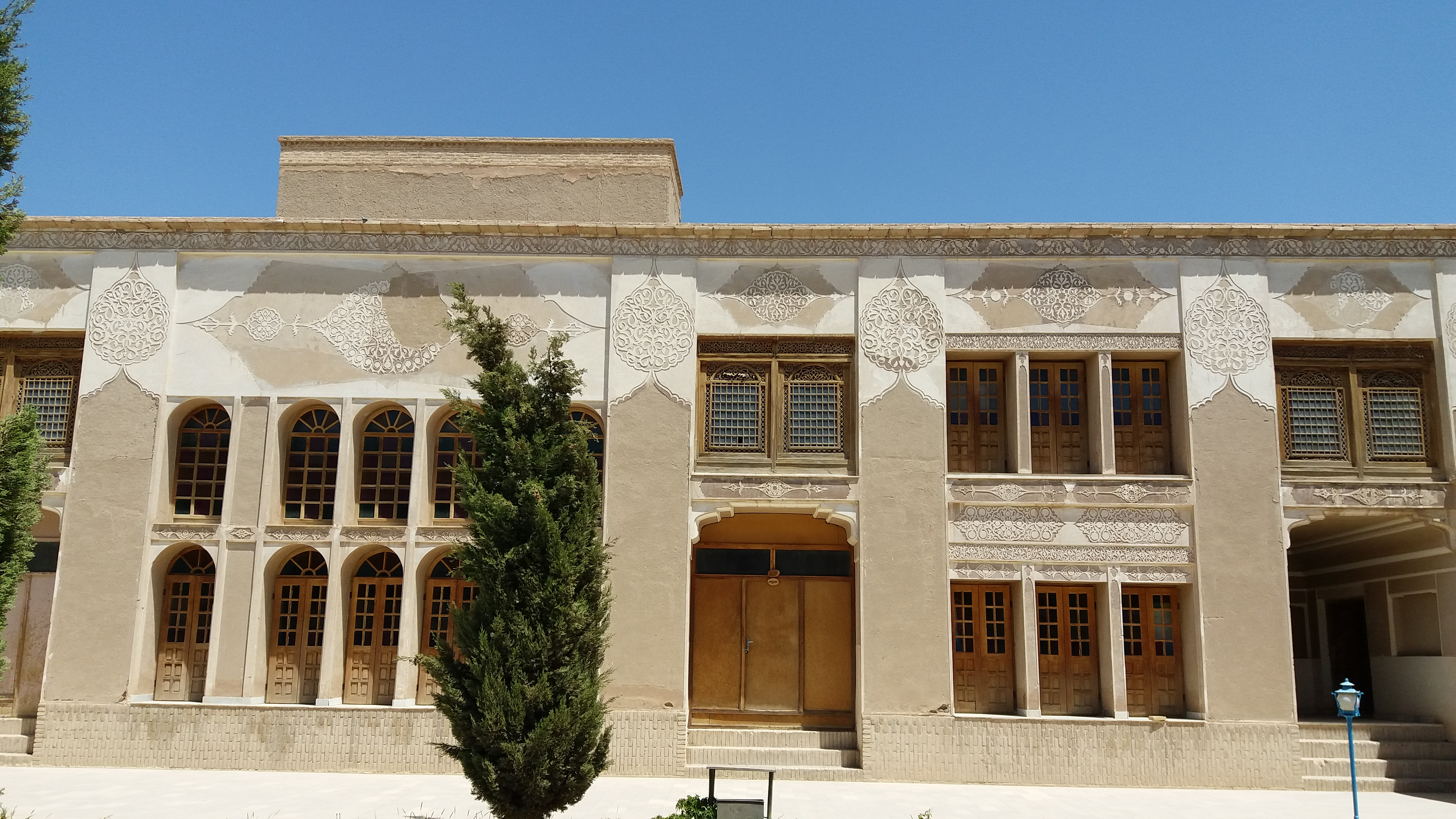
Mousa Khani Mansion

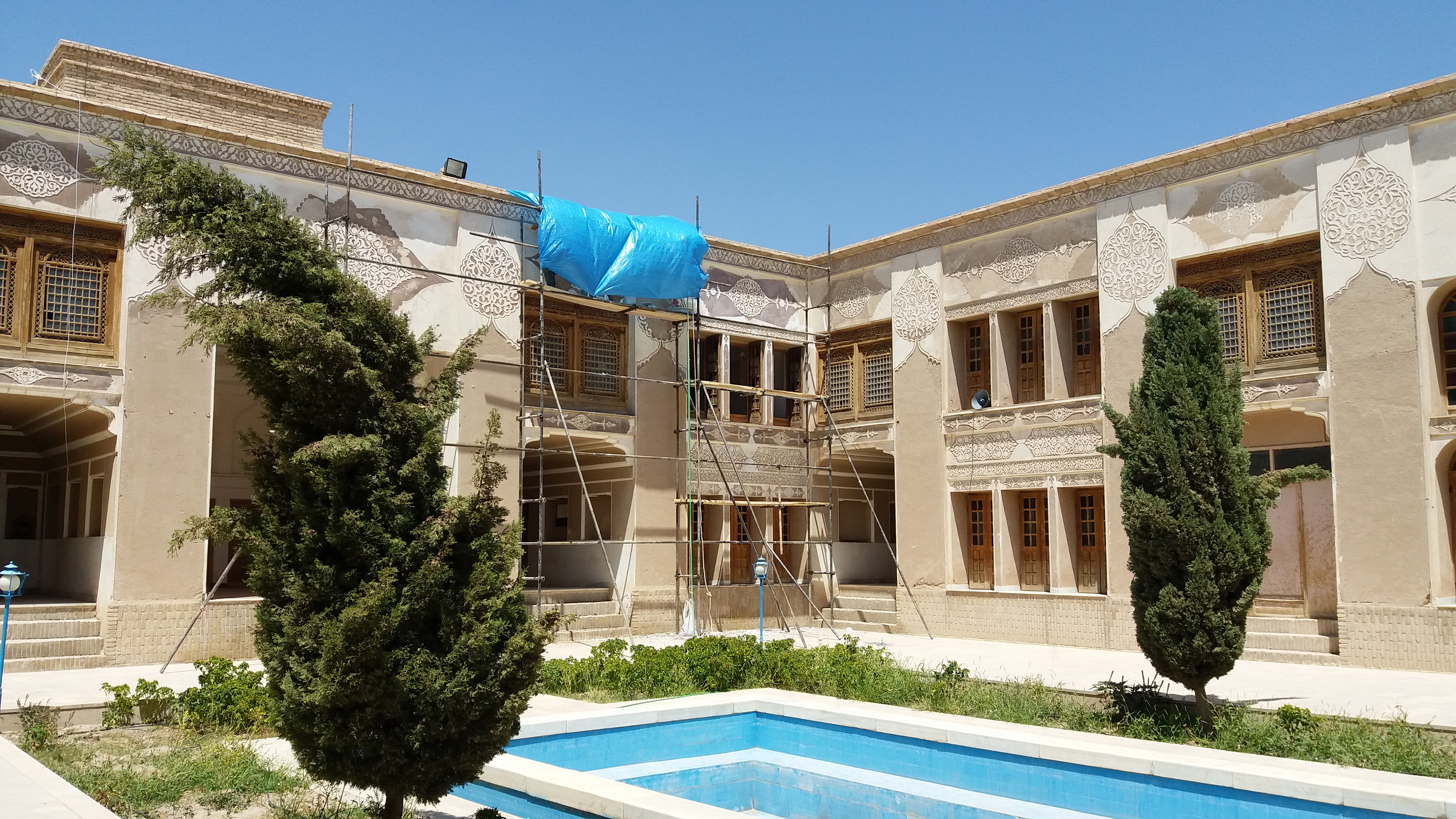
Mousa Khani Mansion

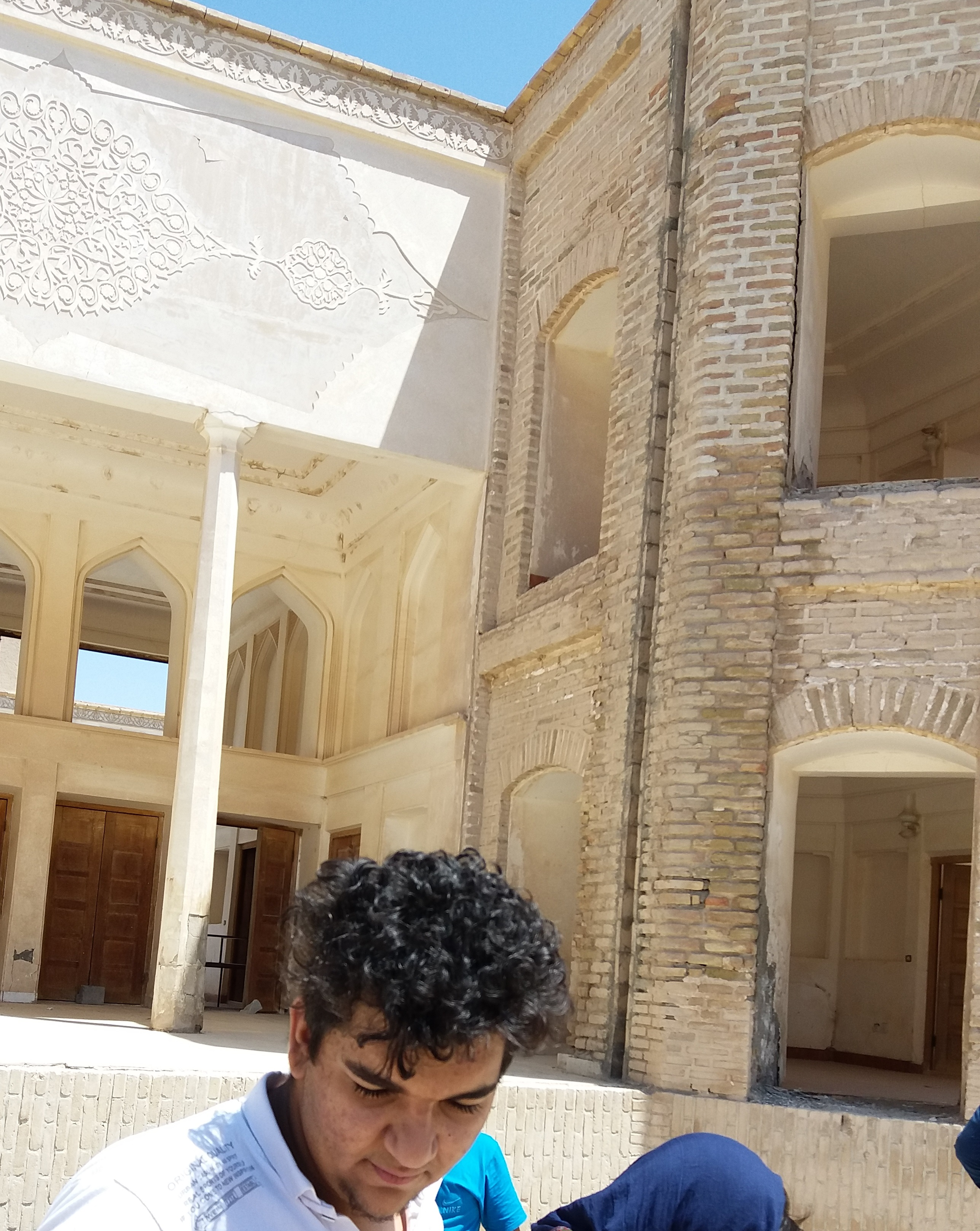
Mousa Khani Mansion
