= Barfeh =

Village in Kerman province, Iran

Barfeh Persian: برفه
- Village
- Location within Iran
- Coordinates: 30°03′50″N 55°12′09″E
- Country: Iran
- Province: Kerman
- County: Shahr-e Babak
- District: Central
- Rural District: Khatunabad

Population (2016)
  - Total: 530
- Time zone: UTC+3:30 (IRST)

Barfeh (Persian: برفه) (Note: Also known as Barfi) is a village in Khatunabad Rural District of the Central District of Shahr-e Babak County, Kerman province, Iran.

== Demographics ==
=== Population ===
At the time of the 2006 National Census, the village's population was 802 in 184 households. The following census in 2011 counted 590 people in 169 households. The 2016 census measured the population of the village as 530 people in 169 households. It was the most populous village in its rural district.
