= Zara, Iran =

Zara (Persian: زرع) in Iran may refer to:

- Sohrab, Iran
- Zarmeh
