= Fedij =

Fedij فديج
- Village
- Location within Iran
- Coordinates: 30°22′17″N 55°27′01″E
- Country: Iran
- Province: Kerman
- County: Rafsanjan
- Bakhsh: Koshkuiyeh
- Rural District: Raviz

Population (2006)
  - Total: 34
- Time zone: UTC+3:30 (IRST)
  - Summer (DST): UTC+4:30 (IRDT)

Fedij (Persian: فديج, also Romanized as Fedīj) is a village in Raviz Rural District, Koshkuiyeh District, Rafsanjan County, Kerman Province, Iran. At the 2006 census, its population was 34, in 7 families.
