= Zarreh =

Zarreh (Persian: زره) may refer to:

- Zarreh, Hamadan
- Zarreh, Kerman
