= Estabraq =

Village in Kerman province, Iran

Estabraq Persian: استبرق
- Village
- Location within Iran
- Coordinates: 30°03′00″N 55°05′57″E
- Country: Iran
- Province: Kerman
- County: Shahr-e Babak
- District: Central
- Rural District: Estabraq

Population (2016)
  - Total: 3,129
- Time zone: UTC+3:30 (IRST)

Estabraq (Persian: استبرق) (Note: Also known as Mazrā) is a village in, and the capital of, Estabraq Rural District of the Central District of Shahr-e Babak County, Kerman province, Iran.

== Demographics ==
=== Population ===
At the time of the 2006 National Census, the village's population was 1,716 in 431 households. The following census in 2011 counted 2,215 people in 553 households. The 2016 census measured the population of the village as 3,129 people in 820 households. It was the most populous village in its rural district.
