= Hum ol Din =

Village in Kerman province, Iran

Hum ol Din Persian: حوم الدين
- Village
- Location within Iran
- Coordinates: 30°22′06″N 55°25′20″E
- Country: Iran
- Province: Kerman
- County: Rafsanjan
- District: Koshkuiyeh
- Rural District: Raviz

Population (2016)
  - Total: 330
- Time zone: UTC+3:30 (IRST)

Hum ol Din (Persian: حوم الدين) (Note: Also romanized as Ḩūm od Dīn and Ḩūm ol Dīn; also known as Ḩām od Dīn, Ḩāmedīn, and Ḩūmedīn) is a village in, and the capital of, Raviz Rural District of Koshkuiyeh District, Rafsanjan County, Kerman province, Iran.

== Demographics ==
=== Population ===
At the time of the 2006 National Census, the village's population was 306 in 80 households. The following census in 2011 counted 165 people in 59 households. The 2016 census measured the population of the village as 330 people in 111 households. It was the most populous village in its rural district.
