= Khursand =

City in Kerman province, Iran

Khursand Persian: خورسند
- City
- Location within Iran
- Coordinates: 30°09′20″N 55°05′13″E
- Country: Iran
- Province: Kerman
- County: Shahr-e Babak
- District: Central

Population (2016)
  - Total: 8,252
- Time zone: UTC+3:30 (IRST)

Khursand (Persian: خورسند) (Note: Also romanized as Khūrsand; also known as Khorsand) is a city in the Central District of Shahr-e Babak County, Kerman province, Iran, serving as the administrative center for Khursand Rural District.

== Demographics ==
=== Population ===
At the time of the 2006 National Census, Khursand's population was 7,847 in 1,663 households, when it was a village in Khursand Rural District. The following census in 2011 counted 6,672 people in 1,828 households, by which time the village had been elevated to the status of a city. The 2016 census measured the population of the city as 8,252 people in 2,435 households.
