= Rashwan =

Rashwan (Arabic: رشوان) is an Egyptian surname.

Notable people with this surname include:

- Ahmed Rashwan (born 1969), Egyptian director
- Diaa Rashwan (born 1960), Egyptian politician
- Hany Rashwan (born 1990), Egyptian businessman
- Ibrahim Rashwan (born 1978), Egyptian volleyball player
- Mohamed Ali Rashwan (born 1956), Egyptian judoka

== See also ==
- Rashvan, Iranian village
