= Khatunabad =

City in Kerman province, Iran

Khatunabad Persian: خاتون اباد
- City
- Location within Iran
- Coordinates: 30°00′32″N 55°25′21″E
- Country: Iran
- Province: Kerman
- County: Shahr-e Babak
- District: Central

Population (2016)
  - Total: 5,471
- Time zone: UTC+3:30 (IRST)

Khatunabad (Persian: خاتون اباد) (Note: Also romanized as Khātūnābād) is a city in the Central District of Shahr-e Babak County, Kerman province, Iran, serving as the administrative center for Khatunabad Rural District.

== Demographics ==
=== Population ===
At the time of the 2006 National Census, Khatunabad's population was 3,883 in 900 households, when it was a village in Khatunabad Rural District. The following census in 2011 counted 4,201 people in 1,089 households, by which time the village had been elevated to the status of a city. The 2016 census measured the population of the city as 5,471 people in 1,642 households.
