= Behjatabad, Mazandaran =

Behjatabad بهجت آباد
- Neighbourhood
- Location within Iran
- Coordinates: 36°40′03″N 51°27′42″E
- Country: Iran
- Province: Mazandaran
- County: Nowshahr
- Bakhsh: Central
- City: Nowshahr

Population (2011)
  - Total: 811
- Time zone: UTC+3:30 (IRST)

Behjatabad (Persian: بهجت اباد, also Romanized as Behjatābād) is a neighbourhood in the city of Nowshahr, in Mazandaran Province, Iran. It was formerly a village in Kheyrud Kenar Rural District, in the Central District of Nowshahr County.

At the time of the 2006 National Census, the village's population was 780 in 222 households. The following census in 2011 counted 811 people in 249 households.
