= Abdar, Kerman =

Abdar ابدر
- Village
- Location within Iran
- Coordinates: 29°25′23″N 56°56′47″E
- Country: Iran
- Province: Kerman
- County: Rabor
- Bakhsh: Central
- Rural District: Siyah Banuiyeh

Population (2006)
  - Total: 16
- Time zone: UTC+3:30 (IRST)
  - Summer (DST): UTC+4:30 (IRDT)

Abdar (Persian: ابدر, also Romanized as Ābdar) is a village in Siyah Banuiyeh Rural District, in the Central District of Rabor County, Kerman Province, Iran. At the 2006 census, its population was 16, in 4 families.
