= Deh-e Qazi, Zarand =

Deh-e Qazi ده قاضي
- Village
- Location within Iran
- Coordinates: 30°50′52″N 56°49′00″E
- Country: Iran
- Province: Kerman
- County: Zarand
- Bakhsh: Central
- Rural District: Hotkan

Population (2006)
  - Total: 81
- Time zone: UTC+3:30 (IRST)
  - Summer (DST): UTC+4:30 (IRDT)

Deh-e Qazi (Persian: ده قاضي, also Romanized as Deh-e Qāẕī and Deh Qāzī; also known as Khāneh Qāzī and Maskūkān) is a village in Hotkan Rural District, in the Central District of Zarand County, Kerman Province, Iran. At the 2006 census, its population was 81, in 26 families.
