= Dar Ab, Sistan and Baluchestan =

Dar Ab دراب
- Village
- Location within Iran
- Coordinates: 26°49′25″N 59°04′29″E
- Country: Iran
- Province: Sistan and Baluchestan
- County: Dalgan
- Bakhsh: Jolgeh-ye Chah Hashem
- Rural District: Jolgeh-ye Chah Hashem

Population (2006)
  - Total: 53
- Time zone: UTC+3:30 (IRST)
  - Summer (DST): UTC+4:30 (IRDT)

Dar Ab (Persian: دراب, also Romanized as Dar Āb) is a village in Jolgeh-ye Chah Hashem Rural District, Jolgeh-ye Chah Hashem District, Dalgan County, Sistan and Baluchestan Province, Iran. At the 2006 census, its population was 53, in 10 families.
