= Zangiabad, West Azerbaijan =

Zangiabad زنگي اباد
- Village
- Location within Iran
- Coordinates: 36°53′29″N 46°03′21″E
- Country: Iran
- Province: West Azerbaijan
- County: Miandoab
- Bakhsh: Central
- Rural District: Mokriyan-e Shomali

Population (2006)
  - Total: 56
- Time zone: UTC+3:30 (IRST)
  - Summer (DST): UTC+4:30 (IRDT)

Zangiabad (Persian: زنگي اباد, also Romanized as Zangīābād) is a village in Mokriyan-e Shomali Rural District, in the Central District of Miandoab County, West Azerbaijan Province, Iran. At the 2006 census, its population was 56, in 10 families.
