= Koshguiyeh =

Koshguiyeh كشگوئيه
- Village
- Location within Iran
- Coordinates: 29°24′33″N 56°03′31″E
- Country: Iran
- Province: Kerman
- County: Sirjan
- Bakhsh: Central
- Rural District: Balvard

Population (2006)
  - Total: 193
- Time zone: UTC+3:30 (IRST)
  - Summer (DST): UTC+4:30 (IRDT)

Koshguiyeh (Persian: كشگوئيه, also Romanized as Koshgū’īyeh; also known as Kashkoo’eyeh, Kashkū’īyeh, Kashkū’īyeh-ye Balūrd, and Koshkū’īyeh) is a village in Balvard Rural District, in the Central District of Sirjan County, Kerman Province, Iran. At the 2006 census, its population was 193, in 50 families.
