= Kashkuiyeh, Hormozgan =

Kashkuiyeh كشكوييه
- Village
- Location within Iran
- Coordinates: 28°36′38″N 55°48′53″E
- Country: Iran
- Province: Hormozgan
- County: Hajjiabad
- Bakhsh: Central
- Rural District: Dar Agah

Population (2006)
  - Total: 239
- Time zone: UTC+3:30 (IRST)
  - Summer (DST): UTC+4:30 (IRDT)

Kashkuiyeh (Persian: كشكوييه, also romanized as Kashkū’īyeh) is a village in Dar Agah Rural District, in the Central District]] of Hajjiabad County, Hormozgan Province, Iran. At the 2006 census its population was 239, in 66 families.
