= Kashkuiyeh, Jiroft =

Kashkuiyeh كشكوئيه
- Village
- Location within Iran
- Coordinates: 29°14′03″N 57°11′57″E
- Country: Iran
- Province: Kerman
- County: Jiroft
- Bakhsh: Sarduiyeh
- Rural District: Sarduiyeh

Population (2006)
  - Total: 44
- Time zone: UTC+3:30 (IRST)
  - Summer (DST): UTC+4:30 (IRDT)

Kashkuiyeh (Persian: كشكوئيه, also Romanized as Kashkū’īyeh) is a village in Sarduiyeh Rural District, Sarduiyeh District, Jiroft County, Kerman Province, Iran. At the 2006 census, its population was 44, in 9 families.
