= Kushkuiyeh, Isfahan =

Kushkuiyeh كوشكوئيه
- Village
- Location within Iran
- Coordinates: 32°44′41″N 52°53′12″E
- Country: Iran
- Province: Isfahan
- County: Nain
- Bakhsh: Central
- Rural District: Lay Siyah

Population (2006)
  - Total: 16
- Time zone: UTC+3:30 (IRST)
  - Summer (DST): UTC+4:30 (IRDT)

Kushkuiyeh (Persian: كوشكوئيه, also Romanized as Kūshkū’īyeh and Kūshkūyeh; also known as Kūshkū) is a village in Lay Siyah Rural District, in the Central District of Nain County, Isfahan Province, Iran. At the 2006 census, its population was 16, in 5 families.
