= Koshkuiyeh =

City in Kerman province, Iran

Koshkuiyeh Persian: كشكوئيه
- City
- Location within Iran
- Coordinates: 30°31′40″N 55°38′37″E
- Country: Iran
- Province: Kerman
- County: Rafsanjan
- District: Koshkuiyeh

Population (2016)
  - Total: 7,644
- Time zone: UTC+3:30 (IRST)

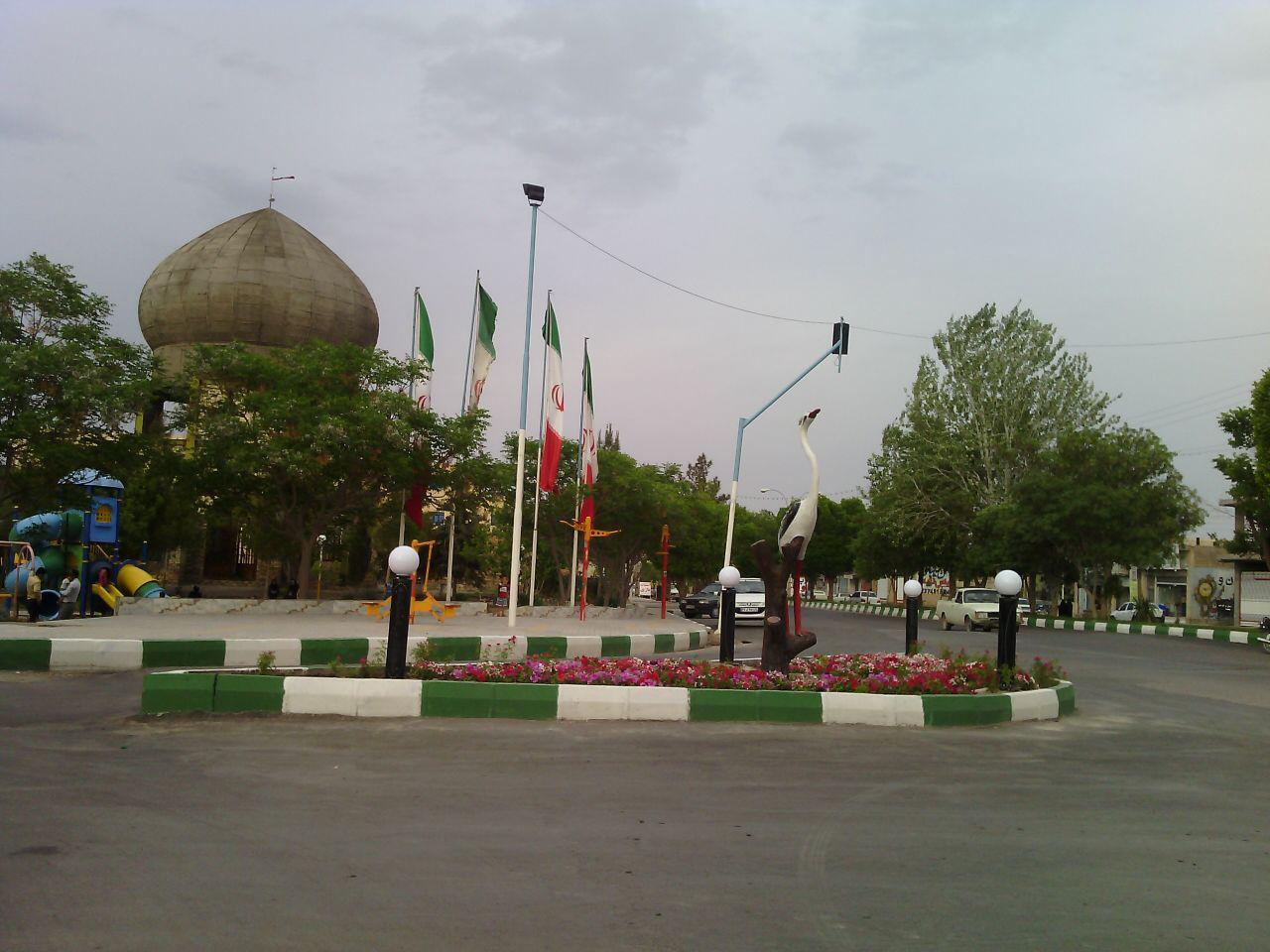
Koshkuiyeh

Koshkuiyeh (Persian: كشكوئيه) (Note: Also romanized as Kashkū’īyeh and Koshkū’īyeh; also known as Kūshku and Qūshk) is a city in, and the capital of, Koshkuiyeh District of Rafsanjan County, Kerman province, Iran. It also serves as the administrative center for Koshkuiyeh Rural District.

== Demographics ==
=== Population ===
At the time of the 2006 National Census, the city's population was 6,150 in 1,428 households. The following census in 2011 counted 6,610 people in 1,712 households. The 2016 census measured the population of the city as 7,644 people in 2,209 households.
