= Kushkuiyeh, Kerman =

Kushkuiyeh كوشكوئيه
- Village
- Location within Iran
- Coordinates: 28°49′26″N 57°55′43″E
- Country: Iran
- Province: Kerman
- County: Jiroft
- Bakhsh: Jebalbarez
- Rural District: Saghder

Population (2006)
  - Total: 54
- Time zone: UTC+3:30 (IRST)
  - Summer (DST): UTC+4:30 (IRDT)

Kushkuiyeh (Persian: كوشكوئيه, also Romanized as Kūshkū’īyeh; also known as Kashkū’īyeh) is a village in Saghder Rural District, Jebalbarez District, Jiroft County, Kerman Province, Iran. At the 2006 census, its population was 54, in 14 families.
