= Abdar, East Azerbaijan =

Abdar ابدار
- Village
- Location within Iran
- Coordinates: 37°39′04″N 46°35′02″E
- Country: Iran
- Province: East Azerbaijan
- County: Bostanabad
- Bakhsh: Tekmeh Dash
- Rural District: Sahandabad

Population (2006)
  - Total: 68
- Time zone: UTC+3:30 (IRST)
  - Summer (DST): UTC+4:30 (IRDT)

Abdar (Persian: ابدار, also Romanized as Ābdār; also known as Udār) is a village in Sahandabad Rural District, Tekmeh Dash District, Bostanabad County, East Azerbaijan Province, Iran. At the 2006 census, its population was 68, in 13 families.
