= Koshkuiyeh Rural District =

Rural district in Kerman province, Iran

Koshkuiyeh Rural District Persian: دهستان كشكوئيه
- Rural District
- Location within Iran
- Coordinates: 30°26′30″N 55°42′38″E
- Country: Iran
- Province: Kerman
- County: Rafsanjan
- District: Koshkuiyeh
- Capital: Koshkuiyeh

Population (2016)
  - Total: 5,969
- Time zone: UTC+3:30 (IRST)

Koshkuiyeh Rural District (Persian: دهستان كشكوئيه) is in Koshkuiyeh District of Rafsanjan County, Kerman province, Iran. It is administered from the city of Koshkuiyeh.

== Demographics ==
=== Population ===
At the time of the 2006 National Census, the rural district's population was 5,995 in 1,438 households. There were 5,325 inhabitants in 1,398 households at the following census of 2011. The 2016 census measured the population of the rural district as 5,969 in 1,734 households. The most populous of its 120 villages was Ahmadabad-e Difeh Khoshk, with 1,862 people.
