= Pa Qaleh Rural District =

Rural district in Kerman province, Iran

Pa Qaleh Rural District Persian: دهستان پاقلعه
- Rural District
- Location within Iran
- Coordinates: 30°11′09″N 55°36′41″E
- Country: Iran
- Province: Kerman
- County: Shahr-e Babak
- District: Central
- Capital: Marj

Population (2016)
  - Total: 2,488
- Time zone: UTC+3:30 (IRST)

Pa Qaleh Rural District (Persian: دهستان پاقلعه) is in the Central District of Shahr-e Babak County, Kerman province, Iran. Its capital is the village of Marj.

== Demographics ==
=== Population ===
At the time of the 2006 National Census, the rural district's population was 1,261 in 371 households. There were 1,489 inhabitants in 514 households at the following census of 2011. The 2016 census measured the population of the rural district as 2,488 in 784 households. The most populous of its 46 villages was Marj, with 554 people.
