= Khatunabad Rural District (Shahr-e Babak County) =

Rural district in Kerman province, Iran

Khatunabad Rural District Persian: دهستان خاتون آباد
- Rural District
- Location within Iran
- Coordinates: 29°58′43″N 55°23′38″E
- Country: Iran
- Province: Kerman
- County: Shahr-e Babak
- District: Central
- Capital: Khatunabad

Population (2016)
  - Total: 1,241
- Time zone: UTC+3:30 (IRST)

Khatunabad Rural District (Persian: دهستان خاتون آباد) is in the Central District of Shahr-e Babak County, Kerman province, Iran. It is administered from the city of Khatunabad.

== Demographics ==
=== Population ===
At the time of the 2006 National Census, the rural district's population was 5,549 in 1,295 households. There were 1,748 inhabitants in 484 households at the following census of 2011. The 2016 census measured the population of the rural district as 1,241 in 417 households. The most populous of its 66 villages was Barfeh, with 530 people.
