= Estabraq Rural District =

Rural district in Kerman province, Iran

Estabraq Rural District Persian: دهستان استبرق
- Rural District
- Location within Iran
- Coordinates: 29°45′09″N 54°56′17″E
- Country: Iran
- Province: Kerman
- County: Shahr-e Babak
- District: Central
- Capital: Estabraq

Population (2016)
  - Total: 6,748
- Time zone: UTC+3:30 (IRST)

Estabraq Rural District (Persian: دهستان استبرق) is in the Central District of Shahr-e Babak County, Kerman province, Iran. Its capital is the village of Estabraq.

== Demographics ==
=== Population ===
At the time of the 2006 National Census, the rural district's population was 5,069 in 1,221 households. There were 5,839 inhabitants in 1,599 households at the following census of 2011. The 2016 census measured the population of the rural district as 6,748 in 1,931 households. The most populous of its 109 villages was Estabraq, with 3,129 people.
