= Khursand Rural District =

Rural district in Kerman province, Iran

Khursand Rural District Persian: دهستان خورسند
- Rural District
- Location within Iran
- Coordinates: 30°04′37″N 54°52′06″E
- Country: Iran
- Province: Kerman
- County: Shahr-e Babak
- District: Central
- Capital: Khursand

Population (2016)
  - Total: 5,065
- Time zone: UTC+3:30 (IRST)

Khursand Rural District (Persian: دهستان خورسند) is in the Central District of Shahr-e Babak County, Kerman province, Iran. It is administered from the city of Khursand.

== Demographics ==
=== Population ===
At the time of the 2006 National Census, the rural district's population was 13,057 in 2,887 households. There were 5,042 inhabitants in 1,347 households at the following census of 2011. The 2016 census measured the population of the rural district as 5,065 in 1,431 households. The most populous of its 99 villages was Muruiyeh, with 1,469 people.
