= Meymand Rural District =

Rural district in Kerman province, Iran

Meymand Rural District Persian: دهستان ميمند
- Rural District
- Location within Iran
- Coordinates: 30°07′43″N 55°27′18″E
- Country: Iran
- Province: Kerman
- County: Shahr-e Babak
- District: Central
- Capital: Meymand

Population (2016)
  - Total: 1,596
- Time zone: UTC+3:30 (IRST)

Meymand Rural District (Persian: دهستان ميمند) is in the Central District of Shahr-e Babak County, Kerman province, Iran. Its capital is the village of Meymand.

== Demographics ==
=== Population ===
At the time of the 2006 National Census, the rural district's population was 2,175 in 536 households. There were 1,522 inhabitants in 495 households at the following census of 2011. The 2016 census measured the population of the rural district as 1,596 in 500 households. The most populous of its 91 villages was Abdar Miyan, with 291 people.
