= Raviz Rural District =

Rural district in Kerman province, Iran

Raviz Rural District Persian: دهستان راويز
- Rural District
- Location within Iran
- Coordinates: 30°24′25″N 55°29′34″E
- Country: Iran
- Province: Kerman
- County: Rafsanjan
- District: Koshkuiyeh
- Capital: Hum ol Din

Population (2016)
  - Total: 1,420
- Time zone: UTC+3:30 (IRST)

Raviz Rural District (Persian: دهستان راويز) is in Koshkuiyeh District of Rafsanjan County, Kerman province, Iran. Its capital is the village of Hum ol Din.

== Demographics ==
=== Population ===
At the time of the 2006 National Census, the rural district's population was 1,374 in 392 households. There were 1,012 inhabitants in 350 households at the following census of 2011. The 2016 census measured the population of the rural district as 1,420 in 488 households. The most populous of its 75 villages was Hum ol Din, with 330 people.
