= Koshkuiyeh District =

District in Kerman province, Iran

Koshkuiyeh District Persian: بخش کشکوئیه
- District
- Location within Iran
- Coordinates: 30°28′22″N 55°36′25″E
- Country: Iran
- Province: Kerman
- County: Rafsanjan
- Capital: Koshkuiyeh

Population (2016)
  - Total: 22,133
- Time zone: UTC+3:30 (IRST)

Koshkuiyeh District (Persian: بخش کشکوئیه) is in Rafsanjan County, Kerman province, Iran. Its capital is the city of Koshkuiyeh.

== Demographics ==
=== Population ===
At the time of the 2006 National Census, the district's population was 22,048 in 5,303 households. The following census in 2011 counted 20,587 people in 5,467 households. The 2016 census measured the population of the district as 22,133 inhabitants in 6,476 households.

=== Administrative divisions ===
Koshkuiyeh District Population
Administrative Divisions	2006	2011	2016
Koshkuiyeh RD	5,995	5,325	5,969
Raviz RD	1,374	1,012	1,420
Sharifabad RD	8,529	7,640	7,100
Koshkuiyeh (city)	6,150	6,610	7,644
Total	22,048	20,587	22,133
RD = Rural District
