= Madvarat Rural District =

Rural district in Kerman province, Iran

Madvarat Rural District Persian: دهستان مدوارات
- Rural District
- Location within Iran
- Coordinates: 30°24′33″N 55°12′46″E
- Country: Iran
- Province: Kerman
- County: Shahr-e Babak
- District: Central
- Capital: Kam-e Sorkh

Population (2016)
  - Total: 3,370
- Time zone: UTC+3:30 (IRST)

Madvarat Rural District (Persian: دهستان مدوارات) is in the Central District of Shahr-e Babak County, Kerman province, Iran. Its capital is the village of Kam-e Sorkh.

== Demographics ==
=== Population ===
At the time of the 2006 National Census, the rural district's population was 3,524 in 969 households. There were 3,142 inhabitants in 944 households at the following census of 2011. The 2016 census measured the population of the rural district as 3,370 in 1,131 households. The most populous of its 164 villages was Masinan, with 257 people.
