= Central District (Shahr-e Babak County) =

District in Kerman province, Iran

Central District (Shahr-e Babak County) Persian: بخش مرکزی شهرستان شهربابک
- District
- Location within Iran
- Coordinates: 29°58′58″N 55°11′02″E
- Country: Iran
- Province: Kerman
- County: Shahr-e Babak
- Capital: Shahr-e Babak

Population (2016)
  - Total: 85,851
- Time zone: UTC+3:30 (IRST)

The Central District of Shahr-e Babak County (Persian: بخش مرکزی شهرستان شهربابک) is in Kerman province, Iran. Its capital is the city of Shahr-e Babak.

== History ==
After the 2006 National Census, the villages of Khatunabad and Khursand were elevated to city status.

== Demographics ==
=== Population ===
At the time of the 2006 census, the district's population was 74,551 in 17,680 households. The following census in 2011 counted 74,911 people in 20,228 households. The 2016 census measured the population of the district as 85,851 inhabitants in 25,646 households.

=== Administrative divisions ===
Central District (Shahr-e Babak County) Population
Administrative Divisions	2006	2011	2016
Estabraq RD	5,069	5,839	6,748
Khatunabad RD	5,549	1,748	1,241
Khursand RD	13,057	5,042	5,065
Madvarat RD	3,524	3,142	3,370
Meymand RD	2,175	1,522	1,596
Pa Qaleh RD	1,261	1,489	2,488
Khatunabad (city)		4,201	5,471
Khursand (city)		6,672	8,252
Shahr-e Babak (city)	43,916	45,256	51,620
Total	74,551	74,911	85,851
RD = Rural District
