= Shahr-e Babak County =

County in Kerman province, Iran

Shahr-e Babak County Persian: شهرستان شهربابک
- County
- Location of Shahr-e Babak County in Kerman province (left, yellow)

- Location of Kerman province in Iran
- Coordinates: 30°29′N 55°05′E
- Country: Iran
- Province: Kerman
- Capital: Shahr-e Babak
- Districts: Central, Dehaj

Population (2016)
  - Total: 103,975
- Time zone: UTC+3:30 (IRST)

Shahr-e Babak County (Persian: شهرستان شهربابک) (Note: Also romanized as Šahr-e Bābak and Shahr-e Bābak (City of Babak)) is in Kerman province, Iran. Its capital is the city of Shahr-e Babak.

== History ==
After the 2006 National Census, the villages of Jowzam, Khatunabad, and Khursand were elevated to city status.

== Demographics ==
=== Population ===
At the time of the 2006 census, the county's population was 100,192 in 22,973 households. The following census in 2011 counted 90,495 people in 24,551 households. The 2016 census measured the population of the county as 103,975 in 31,483 households.

=== Administrative divisions ===
Shahr-e Babak County's population history and administrative structure over three consecutive censuses are shown in the following table.

Shahr-e Babak County Population
Administrative Divisions	2006	2011	2016
Central District	74,551	74,911	85,851
Estabraq RD	5,069	5,839	6,748
Khatunabad RD	5,549	1,748	1,241
Khursand RD	13,057	5,042	5,065
Madvarat RD	3,524	3,142	3,370
Meymand RD	2,175	1,522	1,596
Pa Qaleh RD	1,261	1,489	2,488
Khatunabad (city)		4,201	5,471
Khursand (city)		6,672	8,252
Shahr-e Babak (city)	43,916	45,256	51,620
Dehaj District	25,641	15,584	18,124
Dehaj RD	3,137	2,056	2,106
Jowzam RD	10,659	2,352	2,631
Khabar RD	4,089	2,881	4,906
Dehaj (city)	7,756	3,366	5,045
Jowzam (city)		4,929	3,436
Total	100,192	90,495	103,975
RD = Rural District

== See also ==
Media related to Shahr-e Babak County at Wikimedia Commons
