= Ahmadabad =

Ahmadabad or Ahmedabad may refer to:

== India ==
Ahmedabad, Gujarat

== Pakistan ==
- Ahmedabad, Punjab
- Ahmedabad (Hunza), Gilgit-Baltistan
- Fort Ahmadabad, or Kot Diji Fort, a fort in Sindh

== Afghanistan ==
- Ahmad Aba District, or Ahmadabad

== Azerbaijan ==
- Əhmədabad, Goranboy
- Əhmədabad, Sabirabad
- Əhmədabad, Tovuz

== Iran ==
=== Alborz Province ===
- Ahmadabad-e Etemad ol Dowleh, a village in Savojbolagh County
- Ahmadabad-e Mosaddeq, a village in Nazarabad County
- Ahmadabad Rural District (Nazarabad County), an administrative subdivision of Nazarabad County

=== Ardabil Province ===
- Ahmadabad, Khalkhal, a village in Khalkhal County
- Ahmadabad, Kowsar, a village in Kowsar County
- Ahmadabad, Meshgin Shahr, a village in Meshgin Shahr County

=== Bushehr Province ===
- Ahmadabad, Deyr, a village in Deyr County
- Ahmadabad, Jam, a village in Jam County
- Ahmadabad, Tangestan, a village in Tangestan County

=== Chaharmahal and Bakhtiari Province ===
- Ahmadabad, Chaharmahal and Bakhtiari, a village in Lordegan County

=== East Azerbaijan Province ===
- Ahmadabad, Bostanabad, a village in Bostanabad County
- Ahmadabad, Hashtrud, a village in Hashtrud County
- Ahmadabad-e Leyqoli, a village in Heris County
- Ahmadabad-e Shahrak, a village in Heris County
- Ahmadabad, Jolfa, a village in Jolfa County
- Ahmadabad, Khoda Afarin, a village in Khoda Afarin County
- Ahmadabad, Malekan, a village in Malekan County
- Ahmadabad, Maragheh, a village in Maragheh County
- Ahmadabad-e Garus, a village in Meyaneh County
- Ahmadabad-e Khanliq, a village in Meyaneh County
- Ahmadabad-e Olya, East Azerbaijan, a village in Sarab County
- Ahmadabad-e Sofla, East Azerbaijan, a village in Sarab County

=== Fars Province ===
- Ahmadabad, Arsanjan, a village in Arsanjan County
- Ahmadabad, Eqlid, a village in Eqlid County
- Ahmadabad Rural District (Eqlid County), in Eqlid County
- Ahmadabad, Farashband, a village in Farashband County
- Ahmadabad, Fasa, a village in Fasa County
- Ahmadabad, Firuzabad, a village in Firuzabad County
- Ahmadabad Rural District (Firuzabad County), in Firuzabad County
- Ahmadabad, Kazerun, a village in Kazerun County
- Ahmadabad, Balyan, a village in Kazerun County
- Ahmadabad, Deris, a village in Kazerun County
- Ahmadabad, Kharameh, a village in Kharameh County
- Ahmadabad, Khorrambid, a village in Khorrambid County
- Ahmadabad, Marvdasht, a village in Marvdasht County
- Ahmadabad-e Kateh, a village in Marvdasht County
- Ahmadabad, Pasargad, a village in Pasargad County
- Ahmadabad, Sepidan, a village in Sepidan County
- Ahmadabad, Shiraz, a village in Shiraz County

=== Gilan Province ===
- Ahmadabad, Gilan, a village in Rudsar County

=== Golestan Province ===
- Ahmadabad, Aliabad, a village in Aliabad County
- Ahmadabad, Azadshahr, a village in Azadshahr County

=== Hamadan Province ===
- Ahmadabad, Asadabad, a village in Asadabad County
- Ahmadabad, Hamadan, a village in Hamadan County
- Ahmadabad-e Tappeh, a village in Hamadan County
- Ahmadabad, Kabudarahang, a village in Kabudarahang County
- Ahmadabad, Malayer, a village in Malayer County
- Ahmadabad-e Daryab, a village in Nahavand County
- Ahmadabad-e Olya, Hamadan, a village in Nahavand County
- Ahmadabad, Razan, a village in Razan County
- Ahmadabad, Tuyserkan, a village in Tuyserkan County

=== Hormozgan Province ===
- Ahmadabad, Hajjiabad, a village in Hajjiabad County
- Ahmadabad, Khamir, a village in Khamir County
- Ahmadabad, Minab, a village in Minab County
- Ahmadabad-e Koleybi, a village in Minab County
- Ahmadabad, Mosaferabad, a village in Rudan County
- Ahmadabad, Rudkhaneh, a village in Rudan County

=== Ilam Province ===
- Ahmadabad, Ilam, a village in Dehloran County

=== Isfahan Province ===
- Ahmadabad, Ardestan, a village in Ardestan County
- Ahmadabad, Buin va Miandasht, a village in Buin va Miandasht County
- Ahmadabad, Isfahan, a village in Isfahan County
- Ahmadabad, Kashan, a village in Kashan County
- Ahmadabad, Mobarakeh, a village in Mobarakeh County
- Ahmadabad, Tiran and Karvan, a village in Tiran and Karvan County

=== Kerman Province ===
==== Anar County ====
- Ahmadabad, Anar, a village in Anar County
- Ahmadabad-e Atayi, a village in Anar County

==== Anbarabad County ====
- Ahmadabad, Anbarabad, a village in Anbarabad County
- Ahmadabad-e Esfandiyari, a village in Anbarabad County

==== Kahnuj County ====
- Ahmadabad, Kahnuj, a village in Kahnuj County

==== Kerman County ====
- Ahmadabad, Kerman, a village in Kerman County
- Ahmadabad-e Do, Kerman, a village in Kerman County
- Ahmadabad-e Do, Rayen, a village in Kerman County
- Ahmadabad-e Yek, Chatrud, a village in Kerman County

==== Qaleh Ganj County ====
- Ahmadabad, Qaleh Ganj, a village in Qaleh Ganj County

==== Rafsanjan County ====
- Ahmadabad, Eslamiyeh, a village in Rafsanjan County
- Ahmadabad, Ferdows, a village in Rafsanjan County
- Ahmadabad, Koshkuiyeh, a village in Rafsanjan County
- Ahmadabad, Nuq, a village in Rafsanjan County
- Ahmadabad, Sharifabad, a village in Rafsanjan County
- Ahmadabad-e Abbaskhan, a village in Rafsanjan County

==== Rigan County ====
- Ahmadabad, Rigan, a village in Rigan County

==== Shahr-e Babak County ====
- Ahmadabad, Shahr-e Babak, a village in Shahr-e Babak County

==== Zarand County ====
- Ahmadabad, Zarand, a village in Zarand County

=== Kermanshah Province ===
- Ahmadabad, Kermanshah, a village in Kermanshah County
- Ahmadabad, Miyan Darband, a village in Kermanshah County
- Ahmadabad-e Olya, Kermanshah, a village in Kermanshah County
- Ahmadabad-e Sofla, Kermanshah, a village in Kermanshah County
- Ahmadabad, Sahneh, a village in Sahneh County
- Ahmadabad-e Molla Mas, a village in Sahneh County
- Ahmadabad, Sarpol-e Zahab, a village Sarpol-e Zahab County

=== Khuzestan Province ===
==== Ahvaz County ====
- Ahmadabad, Ahvaz, a village in Ahvaz County
- Ahmadabad-e Abdal, a village in Ahvaz County

==== Andika County ====
- Ahmadabad, Andika, a village in Andika County
- Ahmadabad, Abezhdan, a village in Andika County
- Ahmadabad-e Dinarak, a village in Andika County
- Ahmadabad-e Sar Tang, a village in Andika County

==== Dezful County ====
- Ahmadabad, Dezful, a village in Dezful County

==== Hoveyzeh County ====
- Ahmadabad, Hoveyzeh, a village in Hoveyzeh County

==== Lali County ====
- Ahmadabad-e Barkeh, a village in Lali County

=== Kurdistan Province ===
- Ahmadabad, Bijar, a village in Bijar County
- Ahmadabad, Divandarreh, a village in Divandarreh County
- Ahmadabad, Kamyaran, a village in Kamyaran County
- Ahmadabad, Marivan, a village in Marivan County
- Ahmadabad, Qorveh, a village in Qorveh County
- Ahmadabad, Serishabad, a village in Qorveh County
- Ahmadabad Sara, a village in Saqqez County
- Ahmadabad Sunaj, a village in Saqqez County
- Ahmadabad, Sarvabad, a village in Sarvabad County

=== Lorestan Province ===
- Ahmadabad, Dorud, a village in Dorud County
- Ahmadabad, Khorramabad, a village in Khorramabad County
- Ahmadabad, Pol-e Dokhtar, a village in Pol-e Dokhtar County
- Ahmadabad, Selseleh, a village in Selseleh County
- Ahmadabad, alternate name of Sarab Sorkheh Ahmadabad, a village in Selseleh County

=== Markazi Province ===
- Ahmadabad, Arak, a village in Arak County
- Ahmadabad, Khondab, a village in Khondab County
- Ahmadabad, Saveh, a village in Saveh County
- Ahmadabad-e Shadjerd, a village in Saveh County
- Ahmadabad, Tafresh, a village in Tafresh County
- Ahmadabad (35°24′ N 50°23′ E), Zarandieh, a village in Zarandieh County

=== Mazandaran Province ===
- Ahmadabad-e Kalij-e Olya, a village in Mahmudabad County
- Ahmadabad-e Kalij-e Sofla, a village in Mahmudabad County
- Ahmadabad, Mazandaran, a village in Sari County

=== North Khorasan Province ===
- Ahmadabad Mangeli, a village in Esfarayen County

=== Qazvin Province ===
- Ahmadabad, Abgarm, a village in Abgarm District, Buin Zahra County
- Ahmadabad, Dashtabi, a village in Dashtabi District, Buin Zahra County
- Ahmadabad, Takestan, a village in Takestan County
- Ahmadabad-e Owfan, a village in Qazvin County

=== Qom Province ===
- Ahmadabad, Qom, a village in Iran

=== Razavi Khorasan Province ===
- Ahmadabad, Bajestan, a village in Bajestan County
- Ahmadabad, Fariman, a village in Fariman County
- Ahmadabad, Firuzeh, a village in Firuzeh County
- Ahmadabad, Golbahar, a village in Golbahar County
- Ahmadabad, Gonabad, a village in Gonabad County
- Ahmadabad, Jowayin, a village in Jowayin County
- Ahmadabad-e Malek, a village in Jowayin County
- Ahmadabad, Kalat, a village in Kalat County
- Ahmadabad, Khvaf, a village in Khvaf County
- Ahmadabad, Darzab, a village in Mashhad County
- Ahmadabad, Kenevist, a village in Mashhad County
- Ahmadabad, Razaviyeh, a village in Mashhad County
- Ahmadabad-e Moqbel, a village in Mashhad County
- Ahmadabad, Nishapur, a village in Nishapur County
- Ahmadabad, Miyan Jolgeh, a village in Nishapur County
- Ahmadabad, Zeberkhan, a village in Nishapur County
- Ahmadabad, Quchan, a village in Quchan County
- Ahmadabad, Rashtkhvar, a village in Rashtkhvar County
- Ahmadabad-e Khazai, a village in Torbat-e Heydarieh County
- Ahmadabad-e Sheykh, a village in Torbat-e Heydarieh County
- Ahmadabad-e Banakdar, a village in Torbat-e Jam County
- Ahmadabad-e Sowlat, a village in Torbat-e Jam County

=== Semnan Province ===
- Ahmadabad, Garmsar, a village in Garmsar County
- Ahmadabad, Shahrud, a village in Shahrud County

=== Sistan and Baluchestan Province ===
- Ahmadabad, Dalgan, a village in Dalgan County
- Ahmadabad, Iranshahr, a village in Iranshahr County

=== South Khorasan Province ===
- Ahmadabad, Darmian, a village in Darmian County
- Ahmadabad, Nehbandan, a village in Nehbandan County
- Ahmadabad, Dastgerdan, a village in Tabas County
- Ahmadabad, Deyhuk, a village in Tabas County
- Ahmadabad-e Kalateh, a village in Tabas County

=== Tehran Province ===
- Ahmadabad, Tehran, a village in Varamin County
- Ahmadabad-e Mostowfi, a village in Eslamshahr County
- Ahmadabad-e Mostowfi Rural District, an administrative subdivision of Eslamshahr County
- Ahmadabad-e Vasat, a village in Varamin County
- Imam Khomeini International Airport, originally designated Ahmadabad, an airport in Tehran

=== West Azerbaijan Province ===
- Ahmadabad, Bukan, a village in Bukan County
- Ahmadabad, Dizaj, a village in Khoy County
- Ahmadabad, Firuraq, a village in Khoy County
- Ahmadabad, Miandoab, a village in Miandoab County
- Ahmadabad, Shahin Dezh, a village in Shahin Dezh County
- Ahmadabad-e Dash Kasan, a village in Shahin Dezh County
- Ahmadabad, Showt, a village in Showt County
- Ahmadabad-e Olya, West Azerbaijan, a village in Takab County
- Ahmadabad-e Sofla, West Azerbaijan, a village in Takab County
- Ahmadabad Rural District (Takab County)

=== Yazd Province ===
- Ahmadabad, Yazd, a city in Iran
- Ahmadabad, Abarkuh, a village in Abarkuh County
- Ahmadabad, Behabad, a village in Behabad County
- Ahmadabad, Khatam, a village in Khatam County
- Ahmadabad, Mehriz, a village in Mehriz County
- Ahmadabad, Nir, a village in Taft County
- Ahmadabad-e Mashir, a village in Yazd County

=== Zanjan Province ===
- Ahmadabad, Qareh Poshtelu, a village in Zanjan County

== See also ==
- Əhmədabad (disambiguation)
- Ahmednagar (disambiguation)
- Ahmedpur (disambiguation)
- Karnavati (disambiguation), historical name of Ahmedabad, Gujarat, India
