= Baba Ahmad =

Baba Ahmad (Persian: بابااحمد) may refer to:

- Baba Ahmad, Isfahan
- Ahmadabad, Andika, Khuzestan Province
- Emamzadeh Baba Ahmad, Khuzestan Province
- Baba Ahmad, Kohgiluyeh and Boyer-Ahmad
- Baba Ahmad, West Azerbaijan
