= Ahmadabad-e Sofla =

Ahmadabad-e Sofla (Persian: احمدابادسفلي) may refer to:

- Ahmadabad-e Sofla, East Azerbaijan
- Ahmadabad-e Sofla, Heris, East Azerbaijan Province
- Ahmadabad-e Sofla, Hamadan
- Ahmadabad-e Sofla, Kermanshah
- Ahmadabad-e Sofla, West Azerbaijan

== See also ==
- Ahmadabad-e Pain (disambiguation)
