= Akhmetabad =

Akhmetabad (Persian: اخمتاباد) may refer to:

- Akhmetabad, Ardabil
- Akhmetabad, East Azerbaijan
- Akhmetabad, Qazvin

== See also ==
- Ahmadabad (disambiguation)
