= Ahmadabad-e Pain =

Ahmadabad-e Pain (Persian: احمدابادپائين) may refer to:

- Ahmadabad-e Pain, East Azerbaijan
- Ahmadabad-e Pain, Hamadan
- Ahmadabad-e Pain, Kermanshah
- Ahmadabad-e Pain, Razavi Khorasan
- Ahmadabad-e Pain, West Azerbaijan

== See also ==
- Ahmadabad-e Sofla (disambiguation)
