= Ahmadabad-e Olya =

Ahmadabad-e Olya (Persian: احمدابادعليا) may refer to:

- Ahmadabad-e Olya, East Azerbaijan
- Ahmadabad-e Olya, Hamadan
- Ahmadabad-e Olya, Kermanshah
- Ahmadabad-e Olya, West Azerbaijan

== See also ==
- Ahmadabad-e Bala (disambiguation)
