= Ahmadabad-e Bala =

Ahmadabad-e Bala (Persian: احمدابادبالا) may refer to:

- Ahmadabad-e Bala, Bushehr
- Ahmadabad-e Bala, East Azerbaijan
- Ahmadabad-e Bala, Kermanshah
- Ahmadabad-e Bala, West Azerbaijan

== See also ==
- Ahmadabad-e Olya (disambiguation)
