= Musaabad-e Kashani =

Village in Tehran province, Iran

Musaabad-e Kashani Persian: موسي ابادكاشاني
- Village
- Location within Iran
- Country: Iran
- Province: Tehran
- County: Varamin
- District: Central
- Rural District: Behnampazuki-ye Jonubi

Population (2016)
  - Total: 331
- Time zone: UTC+3:30 (IRST)

Musaabad-e Kashani (Persian: موسي ابادكاشاني) (Note: Also romanized as Mūsáābād-e Kāshānī; also known as Aḩmadīyeh (احمديه) and Mūsáābād) is a village in Behnampazuki-ye Jonubi Rural District of the Central District in Varamin County, Tehran province, Iran.

== Demographics ==
=== Population ===
At the time of the 2006 National Census, the village's population was 405 in 92 households, when it was in Behnamvasat-e Shomali Rural District. The village did not appear in the following census of 2011. The 2016 census measured the population of the village as 331 people in 99 households, by which time the village had been transferred to Behnampazuki-ye Jonubi Rural District.
