= Kalateh-ye Sheykh =

Kalateh-ye Sheykh (Persian: كاجو) may refer to:

- Kalateh-ye Sheykh, Razavi Khorasan
- Kalateh-ye Sheykh, Sarbisheh, South Khorasan Province
