= Korus-e Bala =

Korus-e Bala كروس بالا
- Village
- Location within Iran
- Coordinates: 35°25′44″N 52°01′22″E
- Country: Iran
- Province: Semnan
- County: Garmsar
- Bakhsh: Eyvanki
- Rural District: Eyvanki

Population (2006)
  - Total: 31
- Time zone: UTC+3:30 (IRST)
  - Summer (DST): UTC+4:30 (IRDT)

Korus-e Bala (Persian: كروس بالا, also Romanized as Korūs-e Bālā; also known as Ḩasanābād, Korūs, and Kūros-e Bālā) is a village in Eyvanki Rural District, Eyvanki District, Garmsar County, Semnan Province, Iran. At the 2006 census, its population was 31, in 8 families.
