= Quinak =

Quinak (Persian: قوئينَك) may refer to:

- Qeshlaq-e Quinak
- Quinak-e Rakhshani
- Quinak-e Zohari
