= Kalateh, Tehran =

Village in Tehran province, Iran

Kalateh Persian: كلاته
- Village
- Location within Iran
- Coordinates: 35°20′32″N 51°39′25″E
- Country: Iran
- Province: Tehran
- County: Varamin
- District: Central
- Rural District: Behnampazuki-ye Jonubi

Population (2016)
  - Total: 1,950
- Time zone: UTC+3:30 (IRST)

Kalateh (Persian: كلاته) (Note: Also romanized as Kalāteh) is a village in Behnampazuki-ye Jonubi Rural District of the Central District in Varamin County, Tehran province, Iran.

== Demographics ==
=== Population ===
The village did not appear in the 2006 National Census. The following census in 2011 counted 1,212 people in 324 households. The 2016 census measured the population of the village as 1,950 people in 523 households.
