= Qeshlaq-e Amrabad =

Village in Tehran province, Iran

Qeshlaq-e Amrabad Persian: قشلاق عمراباد
- Village
- Location within Iran
- Coordinates: 35°19′52″N 51°37′23″E
- Country: Iran
- Province: Tehran
- County: Varamin
- District: Central
- Rural District: Behnamvasat-e Shomali

Population (2016)
  - Total: 2,684
- Time zone: UTC+3:30 (IRST)

Qeshlaq-e Amrabad (Persian: قشلاق عمراباد) (Note: Also romanized as Qeshlāq-e ‘Amrābād; also known as Qeshlaq-e Amroabad; also romanized as Qeshlāq-e ‘Amroābād and Qeshlāq-e ‘Amrowābād) is a village in Behnamvasat-e Shomali Rural District of the Central District in Varamin County, Tehran province, Iran.

== Demographics ==
=== Population ===
At the time of the 2006 National Census, the village's population was 2,421 in 575 households. The following census in 2011 counted 2,379 people in 661 households. The 2016 census measured the population of the village as 2,684 people in 805 households.
