= Korak, Semnan =

Village in Semnan province, Iran

Korak Persian: كرك
- Village
- Location within Iran
- Coordinates: 35°23′33″N 52°08′36″E
- Country: Iran
- Province: Semnan
- County: Garmsar
- District: Eyvanki
- Rural District: Eyvanki

Population (2016)
  - Total: 251
- Time zone: UTC+3:30 (IRST)

Korak (Persian: كرك) is a village in Eyvanki Rural District of Eyvanki District in Garmsar County, Semnan province, Iran.

== Demographics ==
=== Population ===
At the time of the 2006 National Census, the village's population was 188 in 55 households. The following census in 2011 counted 106 people in 36 households. The 2016 census measured the population of the village as 251 people in 90 households.
