= Beheshtabad, Semnan =

Village in Semnan province, Iran

Beheshtabad Persian: بهشت آباد
- Village
- Location within Iran
- Country: Iran
- Province: Semnan
- County: Garmsar
- District: Eyvanki
- Rural District: Eyvanki

Population (2016)
  - Total: 20
- Time zone: UTC+3:30 (IRST)

Beheshtabad (Persian: بهشت آباد) (Note: Also romanized as Beheshtābād) is a village in Eyvanki Rural District of Eyvanki District in Garmsar County, Semnan province, Iran.

== Demographics ==
=== Population ===
At the time of the 2006 National Census, the village's population was 39 in eight households. The following census in 2011 counted 22 people in five households. The 2016 census measured the population of the village as 20 people in four households.
