= Hoseynabad-e Korus =

Village in Semnan province, Iran

Hoseynabad-e Korus Persian: حسين آباد کروس
- Village
- Location within Iran
- Coordinates: 35°22′09″N 52°00′34″E
- Country: Iran
- Province: Semnan
- County: Garmsar
- District: Eyvanki
- Rural District: Eyvanki

Population (2016)
  - Total: 190
- Time zone: UTC+3:30 (IRST)

Hoseynabad-e Korus (Persian: حسين آباد کروس) (Note: Also romanized as Hoseynābād-e Korūs; formerly known as Hoseynabad-e Koru (حسين آباد کرو), also romanized as Hoseynābād-e Korū; also known as Ḩoseynābād, Korūs-e Pā’īn, and Kūros) is a village in Eyvanki Rural District of Eyvanki District in Garmsar County, Semnan province, Iran.

== Demographics ==
=== Population ===
At the time of the 2006 National Census, the village's population, as Hoseynabad-e Koru, was 107 in 27 households. The following census in 2011 counted 147 people in 46 households, by which time the village was listed as Hoseynabad-e Korus. The 2016 census measured the population of the village as 190 people in 69 households.
