= Chandab =

Village in Semnan province, Iran

Chandab Persian: چند اب
- Village
- Location within Iran
- Coordinates: 35°25′29″N 51°56′06″E
- Country: Iran
- Province: Semnan
- County: Garmsar
- District: Eyvanki
- Rural District: Eyvanki

Population (2016)
  - Total: 468
- Time zone: UTC+3:30 (IRST)

Chandab (Persian: چند اب) (Note: Also romanized as Chandāb; also known as Gondā (گندا) and Gandāb (گنداب)) is a village in Eyvanki Rural District of Eyvanki District in Garmsar County, Semnan province, Iran.

== Demographics ==
=== Population ===
At the time of the 2006 National Census, the village's population was 425 in 96 households. The following census in 2011 counted 401 people in 108 households. The 2016 census measured the population of the village as 468 people in 151 households.
