= Sangab =

Sangab (Persian: سنگاب or سنگ اب) may refer to:

- Sangab, Razavi Khorasan
- Sangab, Semnan
- Sangab, South Khorasan
