= Hoseynabad-e Kashani =

Village in Tehran province, Iran

Hoseynabad-e Kashani Persian: حسين ابادكاشاني
- Village
- Location within Iran
- Coordinates: 35°20′27″N 51°32′53″E
- Country: Iran
- Province: Tehran
- County: Varamin
- District: Central
- Rural District: Behnamvasat-e Shomali

Population (2016)
  - Total: 345
- Time zone: UTC+3:30 (IRST)

Hoseynabad-e Kashani (Persian: حسين ابادكاشاني) (Note: Also romanized as Ḩoseynābād-e Kāshānī; also known as Hoseynabad-e Daftari (حسین آباد دفتری)) is a village in Behnamvasat-e Shomali Rural District of the Central District in Varamin County, Tehran province, Iran.

== Demographics ==
=== Population ===
At the time of the 2006 National Census, the village's population was 425 in 103 households. The following census in 2011 counted 357 people in 102 households. The 2016 census measured the population of the village as 345 people in 95 households.
