= Mehdiabad, Varamin =

Village in Tehran province, Iran

Mehdiabad Persian: مهدي اباد
- Village
- Location within Iran
- Country: Iran
- Province: Tehran
- County: Varamin
- District: Central
- Rural District: Behnamvasat-e Shomali

Population (2016)
  - Total: 47
- Time zone: UTC+3:30 (IRST)

Mehdiabad (Persian: مهدي اباد) (Note: Also romanized as Mehdīābād) is a village in Behnamvasat-e Shomali Rural District of the Central District in Varamin County, Tehran province, Iran.

== Demographics ==
=== Population ===
At the time of the 2006 National Census, the village's population was 61 in 15 households. The following census in 2011 counted 54 people in 16 households. The 2016 census measured the population of the village as 47 people in 13 households.
