= Qasemabad-e Akhavan =

Village in Tehran province, Iran

Qasemabad-e Akhavan Persian: قاسماباداخوان
- Village
- Location within Iran
- Coordinates: 35°21′02″N 51°37′07″E
- Country: Iran
- Province: Tehran
- County: Varamin
- District: Central
- Rural District: Behnamvasat-e Shomali

Population (2016)
  - Total: 45
- Time zone: UTC+3:30 (IRST)

Qasemabad-e Akhavan (Persian: قاسماباداخوان) (Note: Also romanized as Qāsemābād-e Ākhavān; also known as Qāsemābād) is a village in Behnamvasat-e Shomali Rural District of the Central District in Varamin County, Tehran province, Iran.

== Demographics ==
=== Population ===
At the time of the 2006 National Census, the village's population was 77 in 21 households. The village did not appear in the following census of 2011. The 2016 census measured the population of the village as 45 people in 12 households.
