= Cheshmeh Nadi =

Village in Semnan province, Iran

Cheshmeh Nadi Persian: چشمه نادي
- Village
- Location within Iran
- Coordinates: 35°17′55″N 51°59′23″E
- Country: Iran
- Province: Semnan
- County: Garmsar
- District: Eyvanki
- Rural District: Eyvanki

Population (2016)
  - Total: 352
- Time zone: UTC+3:30 (IRST)

Cheshmeh Nadi (Persian: چشمه نادي) (Note: Also romanized as Chashmeh Nādī and Cheshmeh Nādī; also known as Cheshm Nādī and Cheshmeh Nāvī) is a village in, and the capital of, Eyvanki Rural District in Eyvanki District of Garmsar County, Semnan province, Iran.

== Demographics ==
=== Population ===
At the time of the 2006 National Census, the village's population was 345 in 92 households. The following census in 2011 counted 318 people in 99 households. The 2016 census measured the population of the village as 352 people in 114 households.
