= Sadabad-e Amlak =

Village in Tehran province, Iran

Sadabad-e Amlak Persian: سعداباداملاك
- Village
- Location within Iran
- Coordinates: 35°21′42″N 51°33′57″E
- Country: Iran
- Province: Tehran
- County: Varamin
- District: Central
- Rural District: Behnamvasat-e Shomali

Population (2016)
  - Total: 248
- Time zone: UTC+3:30 (IRST)

Sadabad-e Amlak (Persian: سعداباداملاك) (Note: Also romanized as Sa‘dābād-e Amlāk; also known as Sa‘dābād) is a village in Behnamvasat-e Shomali Rural District of the Central District in Varamin County, Tehran province, Iran.

== Demographics ==
=== Population ===
At the time of the 2006 National Census, the village's population was 220 in 58 households. The following census in 2011 counted 200 people in 59 households. The 2016 census measured the population of the village as 248 people in 72 households.
