= Ahmednagar (disambiguation) =

Ahmednagar is a city in Maharashtra, India.

Ahmednagar or Ahmadnagar may also refer to:

- Ahmadnagar Sultanate
- Ahmednagar district
- Ahmednagar railway station
- Ahmednagar Municipal Corporation
- Ahmednagar Lok Sabha constituency
- Ahmednagar, now Himatnagar, Gujarat
- Ahmadnagar, Chiniot, Pakistan

== See also ==
- Ahmad Nagar Chattha, Wazirabad Tehsil, Gujranwala District, Punjab, Pakistan
- Ahmedabad (disambiguation)
- Ahmedpur (disambiguation)
