= Aliabad-e Farasudeh =

Village in Tehran province, Iran

Aliabad-e Farasudeh Persian: علي ابادفرسوده
- Village
- Location within Iran
- Coordinates: 35°20′04″N 51°33′46″E
- Country: Iran
- Province: Tehran
- County: Varamin
- District: Central
- Rural District: Behnamvasat-e Shomali

Population (2016)
  - Total: 2,522
- Time zone: UTC+3:30 (IRST)

Aliabad-e Farasudeh (Persian: علي ابادفرسوده) (Note: Also romanized as ‘Alīābād-e Farasūdeh; also known as ‘Alīābād) is a village in Behnamvasat-e Shomali Rural District of the Central District in Varamin County, Tehran province, Iran.

== Demographics ==
=== Population ===
At the time of the 2006 National Census, the village's population was 2,178 in 548 households. The following census in 2011 counted 2,515 people in 690 households. The 2016 census measured the population of the village as 2,522 people in 746 households.
