= Bagh-e Khvas =

Village in Tehran province, Iran

Bagh-e Khvas Persian: باغ خواص
- Village
- Location within Iran
- Coordinates: 35°19′51″N 51°33′27″E
- Country: Iran
- Province: Tehran
- County: Varamin
- District: Central
- Rural District: Behnamvasat-e Shomali

Population (2016)
  - Total: 2,477
- Time zone: UTC+3:30 (IRST)

Bagh-e-Khvas (Persian: باغ خواص) (Note: Also romanized as Bāgh-e Khvāş and Bāgh-e-Kavāş; also known as ‘Alīābād-e Bāgh-e Khvāş, ‘Alīābād, Bāgh-e Khāş, and Bāgh-i-Khās) is a village in, and the capital of, Behnamvasat-e Shomali Rural District in the Central District of Varamin County, Tehran province, Iran.

== Demographics ==
=== Population ===
At the time of the 2006 National Census, the village's population was 2,582 in 627 households. The following census in 2011 counted 2,637 people in 765 households. The 2016 census measured the population of the village as 2,477 people in 734 households.
