= Reyhanabad, Tehran =

Village in Tehran province, Iran

Reyhanabad Persian: ريحان اباد
- Village
- Location within Iran
- Coordinates: 35°22′41″N 51°38′19″E
- Country: Iran
- Province: Tehran
- County: Varamin
- District: Central
- Rural District: Behnampazuki-ye Jonubi

Population (2016)
  - Total: 4,439
- Time zone: UTC+3:30 (IRST)

Reyhanabad (Persian: ريحان اباد) (Note: Also romanized as Reyḩānābād) is a village in Behnampazuki-ye Jonubi Rural District of the Central District in Varamin County, Tehran province, Iran.

== Demographics ==
=== Population ===
At the time of the 2006 National Census, the village's population was 3,858 in 922 households. The following census in 2011 counted 4,386 people in 1,191 households. The 2016 census measured the population of the village as 4,439 people in 1,286 households.
