= Ahmadabad-e Do =

Ahmadabad-e Do (Persian: احمد آباد2) may refer to:

- Ahmadabad-e Do, Kerman
- Ahmadabad-e Do, Rayen, Kerman County
