= Ahmadvand =

Ahmadvand (Persian: احمدوند) may refer to:

- Ahmadvand, Kermanshah
- Ahmadvand, Lorestan
