= Jafarabad-e Akhavan =

Village in Tehran province, Iran

Jafarabad-e Akhavan Persian: جعفراباد اخوان
- Village
- Location within Iran
- Coordinates: 35°22′11″N 51°38′18″E
- Country: Iran
- Province: Tehran
- County: Varamin
- District: Central
- Rural District: Behnampazuki-ye Jonubi

Population (2016)
  - Total: 1,786
- Time zone: UTC+3:30 (IRST)

Jafarabad-e Akhavan (Persian: جعفراباد اخوان) (Note: Also romanized as Ja‘farābād-e Akhavān) is a village in Behnampazuki-ye Jonubi Rural District of the Central District in Varamin County, Tehran province, Iran.

== Demographics ==
=== Population ===
At the time of the 2006 National Census, the village's population was 1,649 in 404 households. The following census in 2011 counted 1,810 people in 482 households. The 2016 census measured the population of the village as 1,786 people in 501 households.
