= Ahmedpur =

Ahmedpur or Ahmadpur may refer to:

== India ==
- Ahmedpur, Birbhum, a town in Birbhum district in West Bengal
- Ahmedpur, Latur, a city Latur district in the state of Maharashtra
- Ahmadpur taluka, taluka in Latur district
- Ahmedpur, Jaunpur, a village in Jaunpur, Uttar Pradesh

== Pakistan ==
- Ahmedpur East, a city in Bahawalpur District, Punjab, Pakistan
- Ahmedpur Sial, a city in Jhang District, Punjab, Pakistan

== See also ==
- Ahmadpour, an Iranian surname
- Ahmednagar (disambiguation)
- Ahmedabad (disambiguation)
