= Hoseynabad-e Javaheri =

Village in Tehran province, Iran

Hoseynabad-e Javaheri Persian: حسين ابادجواهري
- Village
- Location within Iran
- Coordinates: 35°18′24″N 51°34′18″E
- Country: Iran
- Province: Tehran
- County: Varamin
- District: Central
- Rural District: Behnamvasat-e Shomali

Population (2016)
  - Total: 107
- Time zone: UTC+3:30 (IRST)

Hoseynabad-e Javaheri (Persian: حسين ابادجواهري) (Note: Also romanized as Ḩoseynābād-e Javāherī; also known as Ḩoseīnābād and Ḩoseynābād) is a village in Behnamvasat-e Shomali Rural District of the Central District in Varamin County, Tehran province, Iran.

== Demographics ==
=== Population ===
At the time of the 2006 National Census, the village's population was 20 in four households. The following census in 2011 counted 88 people in 26 households. The 2016 census measured the population of the village as 107 people in 38 households.
