= Khurin, Varamin =

Village in Tehran province, Iran

Khurin Persian: خورين
- Village
- Location within Iran
- Coordinates: 35°24′12″N 51°38′21″E
- Country: Iran
- Province: Tehran
- County: Varamin
- District: Central
- Rural District: Behnampazuki-ye Jonubi

Population (2016)
  - Total: 7,223
- Time zone: UTC+3:30 (IRST)

Khurin (Persian: خورين) (Note: Also romanized as Khowrīn and Khūrīn; also known as Khorīn) is a village in, and the capital of, Behnampazuki-ye Jonubi Rural District in the Central District of Varamin County, Tehran province, Iran. The previous capital of the rural district was the village of Baqerabad, now the city of Baqershahr.

== Demographics ==
=== Population ===
At the time of the 2006 National Census, the village's population was 4,456 in 1,088 households. The following census in 2011 counted 29,447 people in 1,482 households. The 2016 census measured the population of the village as 7,223 people in 1,301 households. It was the most populous village in its rural district.
