= Avdal =

Avdal may refer to:

- Avdal, Azerbaijan, a village in the Tovuz Rayon
- Avdalen, a valley in Norway
