= Yolpaq =

- Location within Azerbaijan
- Coordinates: 40°43′26″N 46°37′37″E
- Country: Azerbaijan
- Rayon: Goranboy
- Municipality: Muzdurlar

Population
  - Total: 904
- Time zone: UTC+4 (AZT)
  - Summer (DST): UTC+5 (AZT)

Yolpaq (also, Yolpax, Yëlpak, and Yelpakh) is a village and municipality in the Goranboy Rayon of Azerbaijan. It has a population of 904.
