= Jannatabad, Semnan =

Village in Semnan province, Iran

Jannatabad Persian: جنت‌آباد
- Village
- Location within Iran
- Coordinates: 35°19′33″N 51°58′35″E
- Country: Iran
- Province: Semnan
- County: Garmsar
- District: Eyvanki
- Rural District: Eyvanki

Population (2016)
  - Total: 242
- Time zone: UTC+3:30 (IRST)

Jannatabad (Persian: جنت‌آباد) (Note: Also romanized as Jannatābād) is a village in Eyvanki Rural District of Eyvanki District in Garmsar County, Semnan province, Iran.

== Demographics ==
=== Population ===
At the time of the 2006 National Census, the village's population was 297 in 69 households. The following census in 2011 counted 231 people in 62 households. The 2016 census measured the population of the village as 242 people in 82 households.
