= Shur Qazi =

Village in Semnan province, Iran

Shur Qazi Persian: شورقاضي
- Village
- Location within Iran
- Coordinates: 35°16′37″N 51°53′00″E
- Country: Iran
- Province: Semnan
- County: Garmsar
- District: Eyvanki
- Rural District: Eyvanki

Population (2016)
  - Total: 255
- Time zone: UTC+3:30 (IRST)

Shur Qazi (Persian: شورقاضي) (Note: Also romanized as Shūr Qāẕī; also known as Shūr) is a village in Eyvanki Rural District of Eyvanki District in Garmsar County, Semnan province, Iran.

== Demographics ==
=== Population ===
At the time of the 2006 National Census, the village's population was 224 in 60 households. The following census in 2011 counted 147 people in 44 households. The 2016 census measured the population of the village as 255 people in 88 households.
