= Sangab, Semnan =

Sangab سنگاب
- Village
- Location within Iran
- Coordinates: 35°27′47″N 51°59′30″E
- Country: Iran
- Province: Semnan
- County: Garmsar
- Bakhsh: Eyvanki
- Rural District: Eyvanki

Population (2006)
  - Total: 34
- Time zone: UTC+3:30 (IRST)
  - Summer (DST): UTC+4:30 (IRDT)

Sangab (Persian: سنگاب, also Romanized as Sangāb) is a village in Eyvanki Rural District, Eyvanki District, Garmsar County, Semnan Province, Iran. At the 2006 census, its population was 34, in 8 families.
