= Behnampazuki-ye Jonubi Rural District =

Rural district in Tehran province, Iran

Behnampazuki-ye Jonubi Rural District Persian: دهستان بهنام پازوكي جنوبي
- Rural District
- Location within Iran
- Coordinates: 35°24′N 51°39′E
- Country: Iran
- Province: Tehran
- County: Varamin
- District: Central
- Established: 1987
- Capital: Khurin

Population (2016)
  - Total: 21,638
- Time zone: UTC+3:30 (IRST)

Behnampazuki-ye Jonubi Rural District (Persian: دهستان بهنام پازوكي جنوبي) is in the Central District of Varamin County, Tehran province, Iran. Its capital is the village of Khurin. The previous capital of the rural district was the village of Baqerabad, now the city of Baqershahr.

== Demographics ==
=== Population ===
At the time of the 2006 National Census, the rural district's population was 12,940 in 3,121 households. There were 41,609 inhabitants in 4,719 households at the following census of 2011. The 2016 census measured the population of the rural district as 21,638 in 5,442 households. The most populous of its nine villages was Khurin, with 7,223 people.

=== Other villages in the rural district ===
- Jafarabad-e Akhavan
- Kalateh
- Musaabad-e Kashani
- Qeshlaq-e Quinak
- Quinak-e Zohari
- Reyhanabad
