= Quinak-e Zohari =

Village in Tehran province, Iran

Quinak-e Zohari Persian: قويينك زهري
- Village
- Location within Iran
- Coordinates: 35°23′39″N 51°39′54″E
- Country: Iran
- Province: Tehran
- County: Varamin
- District: Central
- Rural District: Behnampazuki-ye Jonubi

Population (2016)
  - Total: 336
- Time zone: UTC+3:30 (IRST)

Quinak-e Zohari (Persian: قويينك زهري) (Note: Also romanized as Qū’īnak-e Zoharī; also known as Qū’īnak and Qū’īnak-e Jaddeh) is a village in Behnampazuki-ye Jonubi Rural District of the Central District in Varamin County, Tehran province, Iran.

== Demographics ==
=== Population ===
At the time of the 2006 National Census, the village's population was 324 in 76 households. The following census in 2011 counted 325 people in 87 households. The 2016 census measured the population of the village as 336 people in 102 households.
