= Qoçdərə =

Human settlement in Azerbaijan

- Village
- Location in Azerbaijan
- Coordinates: 40°45′N 45°41′E
- Country: Azerbaijan
- Rayon: Tovuz
- Municipality: Əhmədabad

Qoçdərə is a village in the municipality of Əhmədabad in the Tovuz Rayon of Azerbaijan.
