= Karnavati (disambiguation) =

Karnavati is the original name of Ahmedabad in Gujarat, India.

Karnavati may also refer to:

- Rani Karnavati (died 1535), a princess and temporary ruler from Bundi, India
- Rani Karnavati of Garhwal (17th century), ruled the Garhwal Kingdom as regent

== See also ==
- Ahmedabad (disambiguation)
