= Kharturan Rural District =

Rural district in Semnan province, Iran

Kharturan Rural District Persian: دهستان خوارتوران
- Rural District
- Location within Iran
- Coordinates: 35°32′N 56°40′E
- Country: Iran
- Province: Semnan
- County: Shahrud
- District: Beyarjomand
- Established: 1987
- Capital: Zamanabad

Population (2016)
  - Total: 3,067
- Time zone: UTC+3:30 (IRST)

Kharturan Rural District (Persian: دهستان خوارتوران) is in Beyarjomand District of Shahrud County, Semnan province, Iran. Its capital is the village of Zamanabad.

== Demographics ==
=== Population ===
At the time of the 2006 National Census, the rural district's population was 3,616 in 985 households. There were 3,061 inhabitants in 980 households at the following census of 2011. The 2016 census measured the population of the rural district as 3,067 in 1,069 households. The most populous of its 60 villages was Ahmadabad, with 864 people.

=== Other villages in the rural district ===
- Baghestan
- Barm
- Eshqevan
- Kalateh-ye Rey
- Rezaabad
- Salehabad
- Talkhab

== See also ==
- Khar Turan National Park
