= Charax, Rhagiana =

Charax (/kæræks/; Ancient Greek: Χάραξ) was a Seleucid and Parthian town located in the province of Rhagiana, near the city of Rhaga (present-day Rey). According to its Greek name, which translates as "palisade", Charax was a fortified town. Founded by the Seleucids, it was located nearby Apameia according to Ptolemy (Geography 6.4.4). According to Isidore of Charax, who is considered to be the principal primary source, Charax was one of five cities located in Rhagiana, its main city being Rhaga. He also notes that it was situated "at the foot of a mountain called Caspius (...)", which is identified with the Alborz Mountains.

When Phraates I of Parthia extended the Parthian realm eastwards in about 176 BC, he conquered the Amardioi/Mardi tribe, and relocated a part of them in Charax. This was reportedly done in order to create a stronghold needed for the conquest of Media.

The actual site of Charax remains uncertain. Proposed options include modern Eyvānekey and Arazi.

== Sources ==
- Kia, Mehrdad (2016). The Persian Empire: A Historical Encyclopedia [2 volumes]: A Historical Encyclopedia. ABC-CLIO. p. 296. ISBN 978-1610693912.
- Shahbazi, A. Shapur (1991). "CHARAX". In Yarshater, Ehsan (ed.). Encyclopædia Iranica. Vol. V/4: C̆es̆tīya–Chinese-Iranian relations VIII. London and New York: Routledge & Kegan Paul. pp. 365–366. ISBN 978-0-939214-71-6.
