= Ahmadabad-e Vasat =

Village in Tehran province, Iran

Ahmadabad-e Vasat Persian: احمداباد وسط
- Village
- Location within Iran
- Coordinates: 35°19′49″N 51°35′47″E
- Country: Iran
- Province: Tehran
- County: Varamin
- District: Central
- Rural District: Behnamvasat-e Shomali

Population (2016)
  - Total: 2,933
- Time zone: UTC+3:30 (IRST)

Ahmadabad-e Vasat (Persian: احمدابادوسط) (Note: Also romanized as Aḩmadābād-e Vasaţ; also known as Aḩmadābād and Aḩmadābād-e Kūzehgarhā) is a village in Behnamvasat-e Shomali Rural District of the Central District in Varamin County, Tehran province, Iran.

== Demographics ==
=== Population ===
At the time of the 2006 National Census, the village's population was 2,493 in 586 households. The following census in 2011 counted 2,868 people in 781 households. The 2016 census measured the population of the village as 2,933 people in 887 households. It was the most populous village in its rural district.
