= Ahmadpour =

Ahmadpour (Persian: احمدپور) is an Iranian surname. Notable people with the surname include:

- Akbar Ahmadpour (1958–2025), Iranian politician
- Vafa Ahmadpour (born 1983), Iranian rapper, known as Vafadar

== See also ==
- Mohammad Ahmadpouri (born 1979), Iranian football player
- Ahmedpur (disambiguation)
