= Baqershahr =

City in Tehran province, Iran

Baqershahr Persian: باقرشهر
- City
- Location within Iran
- Coordinates: 35°32′04″N 51°24′21″E
- Country: Iran
- Province: Tehran
- County: Ray
- District: Kahrizak
- Established as a city: 1996

Population (2016)
  - Total: 65,388
- Time zone: UTC+3:30 (IRST)

Baqershahr (Persian: باقرشهر; [bɒːɢerˈʃæhɾ]) (Note: Also romanized as Bâqershahr; formerly Baqerabad (باقِر آباد), also romanized as Bāqerābād; also known as Bāqerābād-e Bāqer Of and Bāqerābād-e Bāqerof) is a city in Kahrizak District of Ray County, Tehran province, Iran. As the village of Baqerabad, it was the capital of Behnampazuki-ye Jonubi Rural District until its capital was transferred to the village of Khurin. Baqerabad was converted to the city of Baqershahr in 1996.

== Demographics ==
=== Population ===
At the time of the 2006 National Census, the city's population was 52,575 in 12,478 households. The following census in 2011 counted 59,091 people in 15,761 households. The 2016 census measured the population of the city as 65,388 people in 18,802 households.
