= Ahmadabad, Garmsar =

Village in Semnan province, Iran

Ahmadabad Persian: احمد آباد
- Village
- Location within Iran
- Coordinates: 35°26′23″N 52°09′48″E
- Country: Iran
- Province: Semnan
- County: Garmsar
- District: Eyvanki
- Rural District: Eyvanki

Population (2016)
  - Total: 125
- Time zone: UTC+3:30 (IRST)

Ahmadabad (Persian: احمد آباد) (Note: Also romanized as Ahmad Ābād and Aḩmadābād; also known as Gol Tap (گل تپ), Aḩmadābād-e Gol Tappeh, and Aḩmadābād-e Khāk Tappeh) is a village in Eyvanki Rural District of Eyvanki District in Garmsar County, Semnan province, Iran.

== Demographics ==
=== Population ===
At the time of the 2006 National Census, the village's population was 84 in 26 households. The following census in 2011 counted 53 people in 19 households. The 2016 census measured the population of the village as 125 people in 46 households.
