= Eyvanki =

City in Semnan province, Iran

Eyvanki Persian: ايوانكی
- City
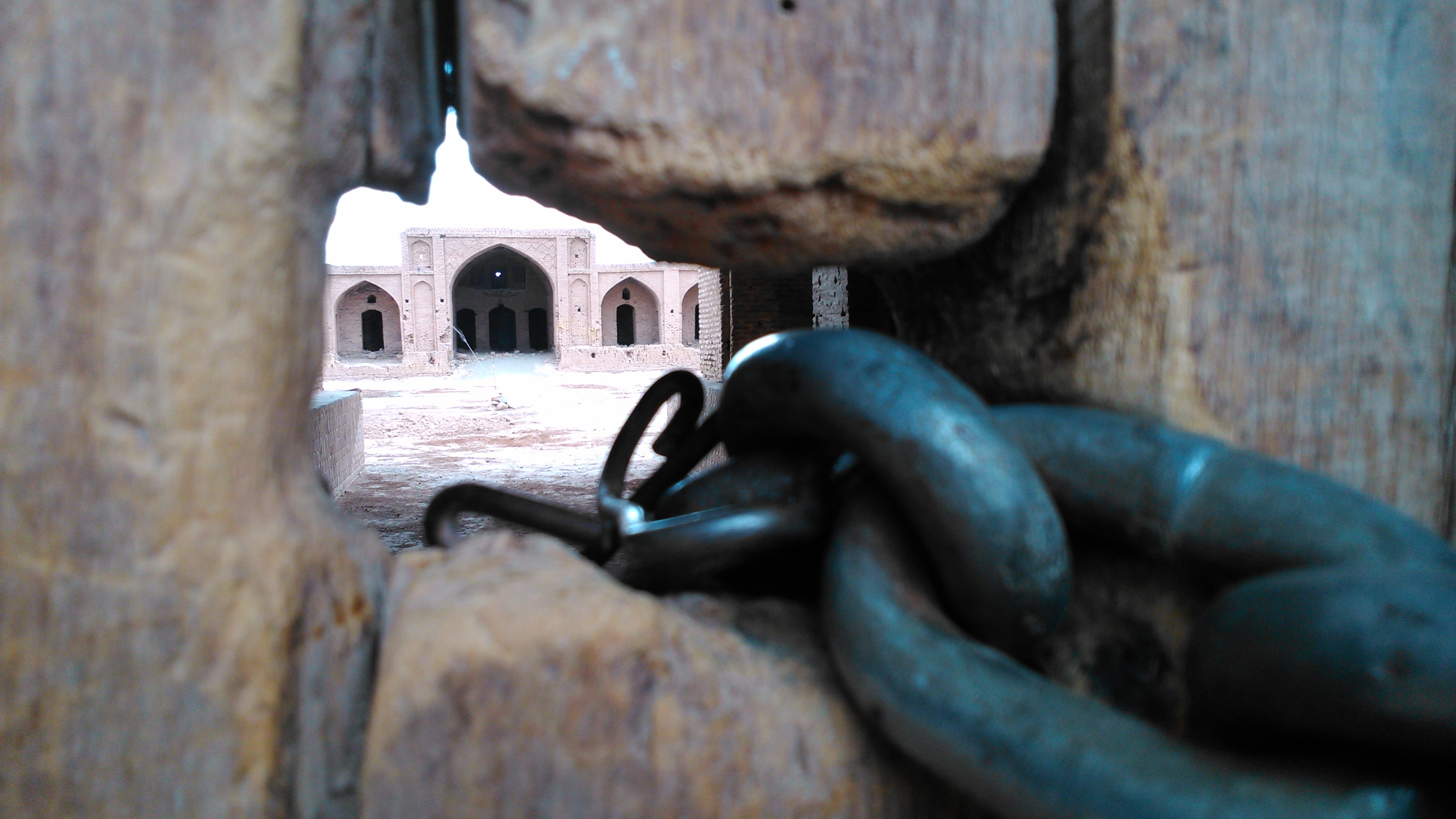

- Location within Iran
- Coordinates: 35°20′40″N 52°04′17″E
- Country: Iran
- Province: Semnan
- County: Garmsar
- District: Eyvanki

Population (2016)
  - Total: 13,518
- Time zone: UTC+3:30 (IRST)

Eyvanki (Persian: ايوانكی) (Note: Tati: ایوان‌کی; also romanized as Aivan-e Ki, Aivaneki, Eyvānakī, and Eyvānkī; also known as Aivān-i-Kaif and Eyvane Kay) is a city in, and the capital of Eyvanki District in Garmsar County, Semnan province, Iran.

== Demographics ==
=== Ethnicity ===
The people of Eyvanki are Tat and speak the Tati language.

=== Population ===
At the time of the 2006 National Census, the city's population was 10,396 in 2,760 households. The following census in 2011 counted 11,995 people in 3,584 households. The 2016 census measured the population of the city as 13,518 people in 4,619 households.

== See also ==
- Charax, Rhagiana
