= Rezaabad, Semnan =

Village in Semnan province, Iran

Rezaabad Persian: رضا آباد
- Village
- Location within Iran
- Coordinates: 35°56′21″N 56°40′55″E
- Country: Iran
- Province: Semnan
- County: Shahrud
- District: Beyarjomand
- Rural District: Kharturan

Population (2016)
  - Total: 240
- Time zone: UTC+3:30 (IRST)

Rezaabad (Persian: رضا آباد) (Note: Also romanized as Reẕāābād) is a village in Kharturan Rural District of Beyarjomand District in Shahrud County, Semnan province, Iran.

== Demographics ==
=== Population ===
At the time of the 2006 National Census, the village's population was 277 in 67 households. The following census in 2011 counted 229 people in 67 households. The 2016 census measured the population of the village as 240 people in 79 households.
