= Talkhab, Semnan =

Village in Semnan province, Iran

Talkhab Persian: تلخاب
- Village
- Location within Iran
- Coordinates: 35°32′59″N 56°55′48″E
- Country: Iran
- Province: Semnan
- County: Shahrud
- District: Beyarjomand
- Rural District: Kharturan

Population (2016)
  - Total: 98
- Time zone: UTC+3:30 (IRST)

Talkhab (Persian: تلخاب) (Note: Also romanized as Talkhāb) is a village in Kharturan Rural District of Beyarjomand District in Shahrud County, Semnan province, Iran.

== Demographics ==
=== Population ===
At the time of the 2006 National Census, the village's population was 142 in 35 households. The following census in 2011 counted 101 people in 32 households. The 2016 census measured the population of the village as 98 people in 36 households.
