= Qeshlaq-e Quinak =

Village in Tehran province, Iran

Qeshlaq-e Quinak Persian: قشلاق قويينك
- Village
- Location within Iran
- Coordinates: 35°22′49″N 51°38′44″E
- Country: Iran
- Province: Tehran
- County: Varamin
- District: Central
- Rural District: Behnampazuki-ye Jonubi

Population (2016)
  - Total: 5,571
- Time zone: UTC+3:30 (IRST)

Qeshlaq-e Quinak (Persian: قشلاق قويينك) (Note: Also romanized as Qeshlāq-e Qū’īnak; also known as Qū’īnak) is a village in Behnampazuki-ye Jonubi Rural District of the Central District in Varamin County, Tehran province, Iran.

== Demographics ==
=== Population ===
At the time of the 2006 National Census, the village's population was 2,653 in 631 households. The following census in 2011 counted 4,429 people in 1,153 households. The 2016 census measured the population of the village as 5,571 people in 1,628 households.
