= Zamanabad, Semnan =

Village in Semnan province, Iran

Zamanabad Persian: زمان آباد
- Village
- Location within Iran
- Coordinates: 35°35′24″N 56°46′19″E
- Country: Iran
- Province: Semnan
- County: Shahrud
- District: Beyarjomand
- Rural District: Kharturan

Population (2016)
  - Total: 297
- Time zone: UTC+3:30 (IRST)

Zamanabad (Persian: زمان آباد) (Note: Also romanized as Zamānābād; also known as Zabunābād) is a village in, and the capital of, Kharturan Rural District in Beyarjomand District of Shahrud County, Semnan province, Iran.

== Demographics ==
=== Population ===
At the time of the 2006 National Census, the village's population was 242 in 80 households. The following census in 2011 counted 395 people in 89 households. The 2016 census measured the population of the village as 297 people in 83 households.
