= Baghestan, Shahrud =

Village in Semnan province, Iran

Baghestan Persian: باغستان
- Village
- Location within Iran
- Coordinates: 35°33′57″N 56°46′04″E
- Country: Iran
- Province: Semnan
- County: Shahrud
- District: Beyarjomand
- Rural District: Kharturan

Population (2016)
  - Total: 93
- Time zone: UTC+3:30 (IRST)

Baghestan (Persian: باغستان) (Note: Also romanized as Bāghestān; also known as Gūjū) is a village in Kharturan Rural District of Beyarjomand District in Shahrud County, Semnan province, Iran.

== Demographics ==
=== Population ===
At the time of the 2006 National Census, the village's population was 108 in 28 households. The following census in 2011 counted 104 people in 34 households. The 2016 census measured the population of the village as 93 people in 39 households.
