= Ahmedpur, Jaunpur =

Village in Jaunpur, Uttar Pradesh, India

Coordinates: 18°42′N 76°56′E

Ahmedpur is a village in Jaunpur, Uttar Pradesh, India.
