= Ahmadabad-e Abdal =

Ahmadabad-e Abdal احمدابادعبدال
- Village
- Location within Iran
- Coordinates: 31°13′06″N 48°23′23″E
- Country: Iran
- Province: Khuzestan
- County: Ahvaz
- Bakhsh: Central
- Rural District: Esmailiyeh

Population (2006)
  - Total: 153
- Time zone: UTC+3:30 (IRST)
  - Summer (DST): UTC+4:30 (IRDT)

Ahmadabad-e Abdal (Persian: احمدابادعبدال, also Romanized as Aḩmadābād-e ‘Abdāl) is a village in Esmailiyeh Rural District, in the Central District of Ahvaz County, Khuzestan Province, Iran. At the 2006 census, its population was 153, in 31 families.
