= Emamzadeh Baba Ahmad =

Emamzadeh Baba Ahmad امامزاده بابااحمد
- Village
- Location within Iran
- Coordinates: 32°19′31″N 49°21′35″E
- Country: Iran
- Province: Khuzestan
- County: Andika
- Bakhsh: Central
- Rural District: Qaleh-ye Khvajeh

Population (2006)
  - Total: 350
- Time zone: UTC+3:30 (IRST)
  - Summer (DST): UTC+4:30 (IRDT)

Emamzadeh Baba Ahmad (Persian: امامزاده بابااحمد, also Romanized as Emamzādeh Bābā Aḩmad; also known as Bābā Aḩmad and Tang-e Bābā Aḩmad) is a village in Qaleh-ye Khvajeh Rural District, in the Central District of Andika County, Khuzestan Province, Iran. At the 2006 census, its population was 350, in 53 families.
