= Ahmadabad-e Posht Kan =

Ahmadabad-e Posht Kan احمدابادپشت كن
- Village
- Location within Iran
- Coordinates: 30°33′36″N 54°54′00″E
- Country: Iran
- Province: Kerman
- County: Shahr-e Babak
- Bakhsh: Dehaj
- Rural District: Jowzam

Population (2006)
  - Total: 14
- Time zone: UTC+3:30 (IRST)
  - Summer (DST): UTC+4:30 (IRDT)

Ahmadabad-e Posht Kan (Persian: احمدابادپشت كن, also Romanized as Aḩmadābād-e Posht Kan; also known as Aḩmadābād) is a village in Jowzam Rural District, Dehaj District, Shahr-e Babak County, Kerman Province, Iran. At the 2006 census, its population was 14, in 5 families.
