= Ahmadabad-e Mashir =

Ahmadabad-e Mashir احمدابادمشير
- Village
- Location within Iran
- Coordinates: 31°47′36″N 54°27′41″E
- Country: Iran
- Province: Yazd
- County: Yazd
- Bakhsh: Central
- Rural District: Fahraj

Population (2006)
  - Total: 2,664
- Time zone: UTC+3:30 (IRST)
  - Summer (DST): UTC+4:30 (IRDT)

Ahmadabad-e Mashir (Persian: احمدابادمشير, also Romanized as Aḩmadābād-e Mashīr and Aḩmadābād-e Moshīr; also known as Mollā Bāshī) is a village in Fahraj Rural District, in the Central District of Yazd County, Yazd Province, Iran. At the 2006 census, its population was 2,664, in 630 families.
