= Ahmadabad-e Dash Kasan =

Ahmadabad-e Dash Kasan احمدابادداش كسن
- Village
- Location within Iran
- Coordinates: 36°44′03″N 46°27′05″E
- Country: Iran
- Province: West Azerbaijan
- County: Shahin Dezh
- Bakhsh: Central
- Rural District: Mahmudabad

Population (2006)
  - Total: 67
- Time zone: UTC+3:30 (IRST)
  - Summer (DST): UTC+4:30 (IRDT)

Ahmadabad-e Dash Kasan (Persian: احمدابادداش كسن, also Romanized as Aḩmadābād-e Dāsh Kasan) is a village in Mahmudabad Rural District, in the Central District of Shahin Dezh County, West Azerbaijan Province, Iran. At the 2006 census, its population was 67, in 14 families.
