= Kalateh-ye Kolukh =

Kalateh-ye Kolukh كلاته كلوخ
- Village
- Location within Iran
- Coordinates: 34°31′21″N 58°31′59″E
- Country: Iran
- Province: Razavi Khorasan
- County: Gonabad
- Bakhsh: Central
- Rural District: Howmeh

Population (2006)
  - Total: 121
- Time zone: UTC+3:30 (IRST)
  - Summer (DST): UTC+4:30 (IRDT)

Kalateh-ye Kolukh (Persian: كلاته كلوخ, also Romanized as Kalāteh-ye Kolūkh; also known as Aḩmadābād) is a village in Howmeh Rural District, in the Central District of Gonabad County, Razavi Khorasan Province, Iran. At the 2006 census, its population was 121, in 34 families.
