= Ahmadabad-e Bash =

Ahmadabad-e Bash احمد آباد باش
- Village
- Location within Iran
- Coordinates: 35°32′06″N 47°51′19″E
- Country: Iran
- Province: Kurdistan
- County: Qorveh
- Bakhsh: Serishabad
- Rural District: Lak

Population (2006)
  - Total: 374
- Time zone: UTC+3:30 (IRST)
  - Summer (DST): UTC+4:30 (IRDT)

Ahmadabad-e Bash (Persian: احمد آباد باش, also Romanized as Aḩmadābād-e Bāsh; also known as Aḩmadābād and Aḩmadābād-e Bāshābād) is a village in Lak Rural District, Serishabad District, Qorveh County, Kurdistan Province, Iran. At the 2006 census, its population was 374, in 75 families. The village is populated by Kurds.
