= Ahmadabad, Divandarreh =

Ahmadabad احمد آباد
- Village
- Location within Iran
- Coordinates: 35°42′29″N 47°02′39″E
- Country: Iran
- Province: Kurdistan
- County: Divandarreh
- Bakhsh: Saral
- Rural District: Kowleh

Population (2006)
  - Total: 396
- Time zone: UTC+3:30 (IRST)
  - Summer (DST): UTC+4:30 (IRDT)

Ahmadabad (Persian: احمد آباد, also Romanized as Aḩmadābād) is a village in Kowleh Rural District, Saral District, Divandarreh County, Kurdistan Province, Iran. At the 2006 census, its population was 396, in 72 families. The village is populated by Kurds.
