= Ahmadabad, Marivan =

Ahmadabad احمد آباد
- Village
- Location within Iran
- Coordinates: 35°26′23″N 46°06′08″E
- Country: Iran
- Province: Kurdistan
- County: Marivan
- Bakhsh: Central
- Rural District: Zarivar

Population (2006)
  - Total: 58
- Time zone: UTC+3:30 (IRST)
  - Summer (DST): UTC+4:30 (IRDT)

Ahmadabad (Persian: احمد آباد, also Romanized as Aḩmadābād) is a village in Zarivar Rural District, in the Central District of Marivan County, Kurdistan Province, Iran. At the 2006 census, its population was 58, in eight families. The village is populated by Kurds.
