= Ahmadabad Sara =

Ahmadabad Sara احمد آباد سرا
- Village
- Location within Iran
- Coordinates: 36°21′48″N 46°11′13″E
- Country: Iran
- Province: Kurdistan
- County: Saqqez
- Bakhsh: Central
- Rural District: Sara

Population (2006)
  - Total: 415
- Time zone: UTC+3:30 (IRST)
  - Summer (DST): UTC+4:30 (IRDT)

Ahmadabad Sara (Persian: احمد آباد سرا, also Romanized as Aḩmadābād Sarā; also known as Aḩmadābād) is a village in Sara Rural District, in the Central District of Saqqez County, Kurdistan Province, Iran. At the 2006 census, its population was 415, in 75 families. The village is populated by Kurds.
