= Ahmadabad Deris =

Ahmadabad Deris احمداباددريس
- Village
- Location within Iran
- Coordinates: 29°42′15″N 51°34′32″E
- Country: Iran
- Province: Fars
- County: Kazerun
- Bakhsh: Central
- Rural District: Deris

Population (2006)
  - Total: 391
- Time zone: UTC+3:30 (IRST)
  - Summer (DST): UTC+4:30 (IRDT)

Ahmadabad Deris (Persian: احمداباددريس, also Romanized as Aḩmadābād Derīs; also known as Aḩmadābād) is a village in Deris Rural District, in the Central District of Kazerun County, Fars province, Iran. At the 2006 census, its population was 391, in 90 families.
