= Kalateh-ye Sheykh, Sarbisheh =

Kalateh-ye Sheykh كلاته شيخ
- Village
- Location within Iran
- Coordinates: 32°27′09″N 59°37′41″E
- Country: Iran
- Province: South Khorasan
- County: Sarbisheh
- Bakhsh: Mud
- Rural District: Naharjan

Population (2006)
  - Total: 14
- Time zone: UTC+3:30 (IRST)
  - Summer (DST): UTC+4:30 (IRDT)

Kalateh-ye Sheykh (Persian: كلاته شيخ, also Romanized as Kalāteh-ye Sheykh, Kalāteh Shaikh, and Kalateh Sheikh; also known as Kal Sheykh) is a village in Naharjan Rural District, Mud District, Sarbisheh County, South Khorasan Province, Iran. At the 2006 census, its population was 14, in 5 families.
