= Ahmadabad-e Harandi =

Ahmadabad-e Harandi احمدابادهرندي
- Village
- Location within Iran
- Coordinates: 30°39′04″N 55°33′20″E
- Country: Iran
- Province: Kerman
- County: Rafsanjan
- Bakhsh: Koshkuiyeh
- Rural District: Sharifabad

Population (2006)
  - Total: 210
- Time zone: UTC+3:30 (IRST)
  - Summer (DST): UTC+4:30 (IRDT)

Ahmadabad-e Harandi (Persian: احمدابادهرندي, also Romanized as Aḩmadābād-e Harandī; also known as Aḩmadābād) is a village in Sharifabad Rural District, Koshkuiyeh District, Rafsanjan County, Kerman Province, Iran. At the 2006 census, its population was 210, in 53 families.
