= Əhmədabad, Tovuz =

Ahmedabad
- Municipality
- Azerbaijani: Əhmədabad
- Location within Azerbaijan
- Coordinates: 40°46′31″N 45°39′52″E
- Country: Azerbaijan
- District: Tovuz

Population
  - Total: 991
- Time zone: UTC+4 (AZT)
  - Summer (DST): UTC+5 (AZT)

Əhmədabad (also, Ahmedabad) is a village and municipality in the Tovuz District of Azerbaijan. It has a population of 991. The municipality consists of the villages of Ahmedabad, Avdal, and Qoçdərə.
