= Ahmadabad-e Razavi =

Ahmadabad-e Razavi احمدابادرضوي
- Village
- Location within Iran
- Coordinates: 30°24′53″N 55°55′12″E
- Country: Iran
- Province: Kerman
- County: Rafsanjan
- Bakhsh: Central
- Rural District: Eslamiyeh

Population (2006)
  - Total: 564
- Time zone: UTC+3:30 (IRST)
  - Summer (DST): UTC+4:30 (IRDT)

Ahmadabad-e Razavi (Persian: احمدابادرضوي, also Romanized as Aḩmadābād-e Raẕavī; also known as Aḩmadābād and Allahābād) is a village in Eslamiyeh Rural District, in the Central District of Rafsanjan County, Kerman Province, Iran. At the 2006 census, its population was 564, in 128 families.
