= Ahmadabad-e Esfandiyari =

Ahmadabad-e Esfandiyari احمداباد اسفندياري
- Village
- Country: Iran
- Province: Kerman
- County: Anbarabad
- Bakhsh: Esmaili
- Rural District: Ganjabad

Population (2006)
  - Total: 191
- Time zone: UTC+3:30 (IRST)
  - Summer (DST): UTC+4:30 (IRDT)

Ahmadabad-e Esfandiyari (Persian: احمداباد اسفندياري, also Romanized as Aḩmadābād-e Esfandīyārī) is a village in Ganjabad Rural District, Esmaili District, Anbarabad County, Kerman Province, Iran. At the 2006 census, its population was 191, in 47 families.
