= Ahmadabad, Malayer =

Ahmadabad احمداباد
- Village
- Country: Iran
- Province: Hamadan
- County: Malayer
- Bakhsh: Central
- Rural District: Haram Rud-e Olya

Population (2006)
  - Total: 26
- Time zone: UTC+3:30 (IRST)
  - Summer (DST): UTC+4:30 (IRDT)

Ahmadabad (Persian: احمداباد, also Romanized as Aḩmadābād) is a village in Haram Rud-e Olya Rural District, in the Central District of Malayer County, Hamadan Province, Iran. At the 2006 census, its population was 26, in 6 families.
