= Ahmadabad-e Barkeh =

Ahmadabad-e Barkeh احمدابادبركه
- Village
- Location within Iran
- Coordinates: 31°58′27″N 49°22′04″E
- Country: Iran
- Province: Khuzestan
- County: Lali
- Bakhsh: Central
- Rural District: Dasht-e Lali

Population (2006)
  - Total: 69
- Time zone: UTC+3:30 (IRST)
  - Summer (DST): UTC+4:30 (IRDT)

Ahmadabad-e Barkeh (Persian: احمدابادبركه, also Romanized as Aḩmadābād-e Barkeh; also known as Aḩmadābād) is a village in Dasht-e Lali Rural District, in the Central District of Lali County, Khuzestan Province, Iran. At the 2006 census, its population was 69, in 12 families.
