= Avdal, Azerbaijan =

Human settlement in Azerbaijan

Avdal
- Location within Azerbaijan
- Coordinates: 40°48′N 45°41′E
- Country: Azerbaijan
- Rayon: Tovuz
- Municipality: Əhmədabad
- Time zone: UTC+4 (AZT)
  - Summer (DST): UTC+5 (AZT)

Avdal is a village in the municipality of Əhmədabad in the Tovuz Rayon of Azerbaijan.
