= Ahmadabad, Shiraz =

Ahmadabad احمداباد
- Location within Iran
- Coordinates: 29°14′28″N 52°22′16″E
- Country: Iran
- Province: Fars
- County: Shiraz
- Bakhsh: Central

Population (2006)
  - Total: 205
- Time zone: UTC+3:30 (IRST)
  - Summer (DST): UTC+4:30 (IRDT)

Ahmadabad (Persian: احمداباد, also Romanized as Aḩmadābād) is a village in Siyakh Darengun Rural District, in the Central District of Shiraz County, Fars province, Iran. At the 2006 census, its population was 205, in 54 families.
