= Ahmadabad-e Koleybi =

Ahmadabad-e Koleybi احمدابادكليبي
- Village
- Location within Iran
- Coordinates: 27°13′07″N 56°58′53″E
- Country: Iran
- Province: Hormozgan
- County: Minab
- Bakhsh: Central
- Rural District: Howmeh

Population (2006)
  - Total: 169
- Time zone: UTC+3:30 (IRST)
  - Summer (DST): UTC+4:30 (IRDT)

Ahmadabad-e Koleybi (Persian: احمدابادكليبي, also Romanized as Aḩmadābād-e Koleybī; also known as Aḩmadābād) is a village in Howmeh Rural District, in the Central District of Minab County, Hormozgan Province, Iran. At the 2006 census, its population was 169, in 31 families.
