= Əhmədabad, Goranboy =

Ahmedabad
- Azerbaijani: Əhmədabad
- Location within Azerbaijan
- Coordinates: 40°42′54″N 46°37′41″E
- Country: Azerbaijan
- District: Goranboy
- Municipality: Muzdurlar
- Time zone: UTC+4 (AZT)
  - Summer (DST): UTC+5 (AZT)

Əhmədabad (also, Ahmedabad) is a village in the Goranboy District of Azerbaijan. The village forms part of the municipality of Muzdurlar.
