= Ahmadabad-e Rashti =

Ahmadabad-e Rashti احمداباد رشتي
- Village
- Location within Iran
- Coordinates: 31°20′03″N 54°01′39″E
- Country: Iran
- Province: Yazd
- County: Taft
- Bakhsh: Nir
- Rural District: Garizat

Population (2006)
  - Total: 58
- Time zone: UTC+3:30 (IRST)
  - Summer (DST): UTC+4:30 (IRDT)

Ahmadabad-e Rashti (Persian: احمداباد رشتي, also Romanized as Aḩmadābād-e Rashtī and Aḩmadābād Rashtī; also known as Aḩmadābād) is a village in Garizat Rural District, Nir District, Taft County, Yazd Province, Iran. At the 2006 census, its population was 58, in 20 families.
