= Ahmadabad-e Qashqaguz =

Ahmadabad-e Qashqaguz احمدابادقاشقاگوز
- Village
- Location within Iran
- Coordinates: 36°57′19″N 46°31′01″E
- Country: Iran
- Province: West Azerbaijan
- County: Miandoab
- Bakhsh: Baruq
- Rural District: Ajorluy-ye Gharbi

Population (2006)
  - Total: 92
- Time zone: UTC+3:30 (IRST)
  - Summer (DST): UTC+4:30 (IRDT)

Ahmadabad-e Qashqaguz (Persian: احمدابادقاشقاگوز, also Romanized as Aḩmadābād-e Qashqāgūz; also known as Aḩmadābād) is a village in Ajorluy-ye Gharbi Rural District, Baruq District, Miandoab County, West Azerbaijan Province, Iran. At the 2006 census, its population was 92, in 22 families.
