= Ahmadabad, Fasa =

Ahmadabad احمداباد
- Village
- Location within Iran
- Coordinates: 28°34′24″N 54°00′00″E
- Country: Iran
- Province: Fars
- County: Fasa
- Bakhsh: Shibkaveh
- Rural District: Miyan Deh

Population (2006)
  - Total: 120
- Time zone: UTC+3:30 (IRST)
  - Summer (DST): UTC+4:30 (IRDT)

Ahmadabad (Persian: احمداباد, also Romanized as Aḩmadābād) is a village in Miyan Deh Rural District, Shibkaveh District, Fasa County, Fars province, Iran. At the 2006 census, its population was 120, in 29 families.
