= Ahmadabad, Marvdasht =

Ahmadabad احمداباد
- Village
- Location within Iran
- Coordinates: 30°00′18″N 52°46′36″E
- Country: Iran
- Province: Fars
- County: Marvdasht
- Bakhsh: Central
- Rural District: Rudbal

Population (2006)
  - Total: 152
- Time zone: UTC+3:30 (IRST)
  - Summer (DST): UTC+4:30 (IRDT)

Ahmadabad (Persian: احمداباد, also Romanized as Aḩmadābād; also known as Aḩmadābād-e Khafrak, Khāledābād, and Khālidābād) is a village in Rudbal Rural District, in the Central District of Marvdasht County, Fars province, Iran. At the 2006 census, its population was 152, in 41 families.
