= Ahmadabad Sunaj =

Ahmadabad Sunaj احمد آباد سونج
- Village
- Country: Iran
- Province: Kurdistan
- County: Saqqez
- Bakhsh: Central
- Rural District: Sara

Population (2006)
  - Total: 24
- Time zone: UTC+3:30 (IRST)
  - Summer (DST): UTC+4:30 (IRDT)

Ahmadabad Sunaj (Persian: احمد آباد سونج, also Romanized as Aḩmadābād Sūnaj) is a village in Sara Rural District, in the Central District of Saqqez County, Kurdistan Province, Iran. At the 2006 census, its population was 24, in 4 families. The village is populated by Kurds.
