= Ahmadnagar, Chiniot =

Ahmadnagar احمد نگر
- Town
- Location within Pakistan
- Coordinates: 31.29°N 72.50°E
- Country: Pakistan
- Province: Punjab
- District: Chiniot
- Time zone: UTC+5 (PST)

Ahmadnagar (Ahmad Nagar) (احمد نگر) is a town in Chiniot District of Punjab province in Pakistan.

The town still has some buildings over 150 years old. After the independence of Pakistan, many Ahmadis moved to this town while Rabwah (now Chenab Nagar) was under construction.

Ahmad Nagar has a government primary and a high school for boys, a high school for girls and several private English-medium schools. A government hospital and many private clinics are also located here.

The main sports of the town are cricket and kabaddi, however, the youth also play hockey, badminton, soccer, merodabba, gillydanda, and many other local games.

Ahmad Nagar was in District Jhang, but now it is in Chiniot District.

== Geography ==
Ahmadnagar is a town situated at the Faisalabad to Sargodha road in the Chiniot District.

== History ==
In 997 CE, Sultan Mahmud Ghaznavi, took over the Ghaznavid dynasty empire established by his father, Sultan Sebuktegin, In 1005 he conquered the Shahis in Kabul in 1005, and followed it by the conquests of Punjab region. The Delhi Sultanate and later Mughal Empire ruled the region. The Punjab region became predominantly Muslim due to missionary Sufi saints whose dargahs dot the landscape of Punjab region.

After the decline of the Mughal Empire, the Sikh invaded and occupied Chiniot District. The Muslims faced severe restrictions during the Sikh rule. During the period of British rule, Chiniot District increased in population and importance.

The predominantly Muslim population supported Muslim League and Pakistan Movement. After the independence of Pakistan in 1947, the minority Hindus and Sikhs migrated to India while the Muslims refugees from India settled down in Ahmadnagar.

Ahmadnagar has a Dargah of Shah Fateh Ali (nicknamed Shah Fatailee). There used to be annual urs at this place.

Recently Ahmadnagar came into TV news - unable to load the video

== Demography ==
The population of the town is Muslim and speak Punjabi and Urdu languages.

== See also ==
- Bhawana
- Chenab Nagar
- Chiniot
- Lalian
