= Ahmadabad, Jam =

Ahmadabad احمداباد
- Village
- Location within Iran
- Coordinates: 27°40′17″N 52°19′37″E
- Country: Iran
- Province: Bushehr
- County: Jam
- Bakhsh: Central
- Rural District: Jam

Population (2006)
  - Total: 72
- Time zone: UTC+3:30 (IRST)

Ahmadabad (Persian: احمداباد, also Romanized as Aḩmadābād) is a village in Jam Rural District, in the Central District of Jam County, Bushehr Province, Iran. At the 2006 census, its population was 72, in 14 families.
