= Ahmadabad, Mosaferabad =

Ahmadabad احمد اباد
- Village
- Location within Iran
- Coordinates: 27°47′32″N 57°11′05″E
- Country: Iran
- Province: Hormozgan
- County: Rudan
- Bakhsh: Rudkhaneh
- Rural District: Mosaferabad

Population (2006)
  - Total: 66
- Time zone: UTC+3:30 (IRST)
  - Summer (DST): UTC+4:30 (IRDT)

Ahmadabad (Persian: احمد اباد, also Romanized as Aḩmadābād; also known as Aḩmadābād-e Kam Sefīdū, and Aḩmadābād-e Poshtū’īyeh) is a village in Mosaferabad Rural District, Rudkhaneh District, Rudan County, Hormozgan Province, Iran. At the 2006 census, its population was 66, in 16 families.
