= Ahmadabad, Dorud =

Ahmadabad احمداباد
- Village
- Location within Iran
- Coordinates: 33°42′42″N 48°52′33″E
- Country: Iran
- Province: Lorestan
- County: Dorud
- Bakhsh: Silakhor
- Rural District: Chalanchulan

Population (2006)
  - Total: 288
- Time zone: UTC+3:30 (IRST)
  - Summer (DST): UTC+4:30 (IRDT)

Ahmadabad (Persian: احمداباد, also Romanized as Aḩmadābād) is a village in Chalanchulan Rural District, Silakhor District, Dorud County, Lorestan Province, Iran. At the 2006 census, its population was 288, in 79 families.
