= Ahmadabad, Pasargad =

Ahmadabad احمداباد
- Village
- Location within Iran
- Coordinates: 30°01′23″N 53°20′08″E
- Country: Iran
- Province: Fars
- County: Pasargad
- Bakhsh: Central
- Rural District: Sarpaniran

Population (2006)
  - Total: 61
- Time zone: UTC+3:30 (IRST)
  - Summer (DST): UTC+4:30 (IRDT)

Ahmadabad (Persian: احمداباد, also Romanized as Aḩmadābād; also known as Aḩmadāb Sānī ol Ḩayat) is a village in Sarpaniran Rural District, in the Central District of Pasargad County, Fars province, Iran. At the 2006 census, its population was 61, in 18 families.
