= Ahmadabad, Razaviyeh =

Ahmadabad احمداباد
- Village
- Location within Iran
- Coordinates: 36°13′56″N 59°52′57″E
- Country: Iran
- Province: Razavi Khorasan
- County: Mashhad
- Bakhsh: Razaviyeh
- Rural District: Meyami

Population (2006)
  - Total: 727
- Time zone: UTC+3:30 (IRST)
  - Summer (DST): UTC+4:30 (IRDT)

Ahmadabad (Persian: احمداباد, also Romanized as Aḩmadābād) is a village in Meyami Rural District, Razaviyeh District, Mashhad County, Razavi Khorasan Province, Iran. At the 2006 census, its population was 727, in 176 families.

== See also ==
- List of cities, towns and villages in Razavi Khorasan Province
