= Ahmadabad, Darzab =

Ahmadabad احمداباد
- Village
- Location within Iran
- Coordinates: 36°31′34″N 59°30′10″E
- Country: Iran
- Province: Razavi Khorasan
- County: Mashhad
- Bakhsh: Central
- Rural District: Darzab

Population (2006)
  - Total: 16
- Time zone: UTC+3:30 (IRST)
  - Summer (DST): UTC+4:30 (IRDT)

Ahmadabad (Persian: احمداباد, also Romanized as Aḩmadābād) is a village in Darzab Rural District, in the Central District of Mashhad County, Razavi Khorasan Province, Iran. At the 2006 census, its population was 16, in 4 families.

== See also ==
- List of cities, towns and villages in Razavi Khorasan Province
