= Baba Ahmad, Kohgiluyeh and Boyer-Ahmad =

Baba Ahmad بابااحمد
- Village
- Location within Iran
- Coordinates: 30°59′27″N 50°00′44″E
- Country: Iran
- Province: Kohgiluyeh and Boyer-Ahmad
- County: Bahmai
- Bakhsh: Central
- Rural District: Bahmai-ye Garmsiri-ye Jonubi

Population (2006)
  - Total: 258
- Time zone: UTC+3:30 (IRST)
  - Summer (DST): UTC+4:30 (IRDT)

Baba Ahmad (Persian: بابااحمد, also Romanized as Bābā Aḩmad; also known as Seyyed Bābā Aḩmad) is a village in Bahmai-ye Garmsiri-ye Jonubi Rural District, in the Central District of Bahmai County, Kohgiluyeh and Boyer-Ahmad Province, Iran. At the 2006 census, its population was 258, in 49 families.
