= Ahmadabad-e Owfan =

Ahmadabad-e Owfan احمداباداوفان
- Village
- Location within Iran
- Coordinates: 36°17′25″N 49°44′56″E
- Country: Iran
- Province: Qazvin
- County: Qazvin
- Bakhsh: Kuhin
- Rural District: Ilat-e Qaqazan-e Sharqi

Population (2006)
  - Total: 128
- Time zone: UTC+3:30 (IRST)
  - Summer (DST): UTC+4:30 (IRDT)

Ahmadabad-e Owfan (Persian: احمداباداوفان, also Romanized as Aḩmadābād-e Owfān and Aḩmadābād-e Ūfān; also known as Aḩmadābād, Aḩmadābād-e Arfān, and Akhmedabad) is a village in Ilat-e Qaqazan-e Sharqi Rural District, Kuhin District, Qazvin County, Qazvin Province, Iran. At the 2006 census, its population was 128, in 29 families.
