= Ahmadabad, Kamyaran =

Ahmadabad احمد آباد
- Village
- Location within Iran
- Coordinates: 35°03′30″N 47°16′11″E
- Country: Iran
- Province: Kurdistan
- County: Kamyaran
- Bakhsh: Muchesh
- Rural District: Amirabad

Population (2006)
  - Total: 42
- Time zone: UTC+3:30 (IRST)
  - Summer (DST): UTC+4:30 (IRDT)

Ahmadabad (Persian: احمد آباد, also Romanized as Aḩmadābād) is a village in Amirabad Rural District, Muchesh District, Kamyaran County, Kurdistan Province, Iran. In 2006, its population was 42, in 10 families. The village is populated by Kurds.
