= Ahmadabad, Shahrud =

Village in Semnan province, Iran

Ahmadabad Persian: احمد آباد
- Village
- Location within Iran
- Coordinates: 35°46′01″N 56°36′10″E
- Country: Iran
- Province: Semnan
- County: Shahrud
- District: Beyarjomand
- Rural District: Kharturan

Population (2016)
  - Total: 864
- Time zone: UTC+3:30 (IRST)

Ahmadabad (Persian: احمد آباد) (Note: Also romanized as Aḩmadābād) is a village in Kharturan Rural District of Beyarjomand District in Shahrud County, Semnan province, Iran.

== Demographics ==
=== Population ===
At the time of the 2006 National Census, the village's population was 844 in 249 households. The following census in 2011 counted 730 people in 271 households. The 2016 census measured the population of the village as 864 people in 300 households. It was the most populous village in its rural district.
