= Ahmadabad, Abezhdan =

Ahmadabad احمداباد
- Village
- Location within Iran
- Coordinates: 32°04′56″N 49°30′05″E
- Country: Iran
- Province: Khuzestan
- County: Andika
- Bakhsh: Abezhdan
- Rural District: Abezhdan

Population (2006)
  - Total: 612
- Time zone: UTC+3:30 (IRST)
  - Summer (DST): UTC+4:30 (IRDT)

Ahmadabad (Persian: احمداباد, also Romanized as Aḩmadābād; also known as Aḩmadābād-e Qeyţās and Aḩmadābād-e Qeytās) is a village in Abezhdan Rural District, Abezhdan District, Andika County, Khuzestan Province, Iran. At the 2006 census, its population was 612, in 124 families.
