= Ahmadabad, Bijar =

Ahmadabad احمد آباد
- Village
- Location within Iran
- Coordinates: 36°09′41″N 47°40′48″E
- Country: Iran
- Province: Kurdistan
- County: Bijar
- Bakhsh: Korani
- Rural District: Korani

Population (2006)
  - Total: 132
- Time zone: UTC+3:30 (IRST)
  - Summer (DST): UTC+4:30 (IRDT)

Ahmadabad (Persian: احمد آباد, also Romanized as Aḩmadābād) is a village in Korani Rural District, Korani District, Bijar County, Kurdistan province, Iran. At the 2006 census, its population was 132, in 30 families. The village is populated by Azerbaijanis.
