= Ahmadabad, Kerman =

Ahmadabad احمداباد
- Village
- Location within Iran
- Coordinates: 29°21′28″N 57°21′01″E
- Country: Iran
- Province: Kerman
- County: Kerman
- Bakhsh: Rayen
- Rural District: Hoseynabad-e Goruh

Population (2006)
  - Total: 187
- Time zone: UTC+3:30 (IRST)
  - Summer (DST): UTC+4:30 (IRDT)

Ahmadabad (Persian: احمداباد, also Romanized as Aḩmadābād; also known as Poshteh-ye Aḩmadābād) is a village in Hoseynabad-e Goruh Rural District, Rayen District, Kerman County, Kerman Province, Iran. At the 2006 census, its population was 187, in 49 families.
