= Ahmadabad-e Khanliq =

Ahmadabad-e Khanliq احمدابادخانليق
- Village
- Location within Iran
- Coordinates: 37°18′58″N 48°02′56″E
- Country: Iran
- Province: East Azerbaijan
- County: Meyaneh
- Bakhsh: Kaghazkonan
- Rural District: Kaghazkonan-e Shomali

Population (2006)
  - Total: 122
- Time zone: UTC+3:30 (IRST)
  - Summer (DST): UTC+4:30 (IRDT)

Ahmadabad-e Khanliq (Persian: احمدابادخانليق, also Romanized as Aḩmadābād-e Khānlīq; also known as Aḩmadābād, Aḩmadābād-e Khānleq, Aḩmadābād Khānleq, and Akhmedabad) is a village in Kaghazkonan-e Shomali Rural District, Kaghazkonan District, Meyaneh County, East Azerbaijan Province, Iran. At the 2006 census, its population was 122, in 31 families.
