= Ahmadabad-e Yalamqani =

Ahmadabad-e Yalamqani احمداباديلمقاني
- Village
- Location within Iran
- Coordinates: 30°44′43″N 56°33′45″E
- Country: Iran
- Province: Kerman
- County: Zarand
- Bakhsh: Central
- Rural District: Vahdat

Population (2006)
  - Total: 963
- Time zone: UTC+3:30 (IRST)
  - Summer (DST): UTC+4:30 (IRDT)

Ahmadabad-e Yalamqani (Persian: احمداباديلمقاني, also Romanized as Aḩmadābād-e Yalamqānī; also known as Aḩmadābād) is a village in Vahdat Rural District, in the Central District of Zarand County, Kerman Province, Iran. At the 2006 census, its population was 963, in 229 families.
