= Ahmadabad-e Molla Mas =

Ahmadabad-e Molla Mas احمد اباد مله ماس
- Village
- Location within Iran
- Coordinates: 34°40′27″N 47°31′32″E
- Country: Iran
- Province: Kermanshah
- County: Sahneh
- Bakhsh: Dinavar
- Rural District: Dinavar

Population (2006)
  - Total: 152
- Time zone: UTC+3:30 (IRST)
  - Summer (DST): UTC+4:30 (IRDT)

Ahmadabad-e Molla Mas (Persian: احمد اباد مله ماس, also Romanized as Aḩmadābād-e Mollā Mās; also known as Aḩmadābād) is a village in Dinavar Rural District, Dinavar District, Sahneh County, Kermanshah Province, Iran. At the 2006 census, its population was 152, in 35 families.
