= Ahmadabad, Qaleh Ganj =

Ahmadabad احمداباد
- Village
- Location within Iran
- Coordinates: 27°26′19″N 57°52′37″E
- Country: Iran
- Province: Kerman
- County: Qaleh Ganj
- Bakhsh: Central
- Rural District: Qaleh Ganj

Population (2006)
  - Total: 309
- Time zone: UTC+3:30 (IRST)
  - Summer (DST): UTC+4:30 (IRDT)

Ahmadabad (Persian: احمداباد, also romanized as Aḩmadābād) is a village in Qaleh Ganj Rural District, in the Central District of Qaleh Ganj County, Kerman Province, Iran. At the 2006 census, its population was 309, in 74 families.
