= Ahmadabad-e Sahlavar =

Ahmadabad-e Sahlavar احمد آباد سهل آور
- Village
- Location within Iran
- Coordinates: 27°52′47″N 57°39′35″E
- Country: Iran
- Province: Kerman
- County: Kahnuj
- Bakhsh: Central
- Rural District: Nakhlestan

Population (2006)
  - Total: 436
- Time zone: UTC+3:30 (IRST)
  - Summer (DST): UTC+4:30 (IRDT)

Ahmadabad-e Sahlavar (Persian: احمد آباد سهل آور, also Romanized as Aḩmadābād-e Sahlāvar; also known as Aḩmadābād) is a village in Nakhlestan Rural District, in the Central District of Kahnuj County, Kerman Province, Iran. At the 2006 census, its population was 436, in 104 families.
