= Ahmadabad-e Dinarak =

Ahmadabad-e Dinarak احمداباددينراك
- Village
- Location within Iran
- Coordinates: 32°21′05″N 49°08′38″E
- Country: Iran
- Province: Khuzestan
- County: Andika
- Bakhsh: Central
- Rural District: Qaleh-ye Khvajeh

Population (2006)
  - Total: 323
- Time zone: UTC+3:30 (IRST)
  - Summer (DST): UTC+4:30 (IRDT)

Ahmadabad-e Dinarak (Persian: احمداباددينراك, also romanized as Aḩmadābād-e Dīnarāk; also known as Aḩmadābād and Aḩmadābād-e Barakeh) is a village in Qaleh-ye Khvajeh Rural District, in the Central District of Andika County, Khuzestan Province, Iran. At the 2006 census, its population was 323, in 65 families.
