= Behnamvasat-e Shomali Rural District =

Rural district in Tehran province, Iran

Behnamvasat-e Shomali Rural District Persian: دهستان بهنام وسط شمالي
- Rural District
- Location within Iran
- Coordinates: 35°19′N 51°33′E
- Country: Iran
- Province: Tehran
- County: Varamin
- District: Central
- Established: 1987
- Capital: Bagh-e Khvas

Population (2016)
  - Total: 11,486
- Time zone: UTC+3:30 (IRST)

Behnamvasat-e Shomali Rural District (Persian: دهستان بهنام وسط شمالي) is in the Central District of Varamin County, Tehran province, Iran. Its capital is the village of Bagh-e Khvas.

== Demographics ==
=== Population ===
At the time of the 2006 National Census, the rural district's population was 10,884 in 2,630 households. There were 11,138 inhabitants in 3,112 households at the following census of 2011. The 2016 census measured the population of the rural district as 11,486 in 3,431 households. The most populous of its 23 villages was Ahmadabad-e Vasat, with 2,933 people.

=== Other villages in the rural district ===
- Aliabad-e Farasudeh
- Hoseynabad-e Javaheri
- Hoseynabad-e Kashani
- Mehdiabad
- Qasemabad-e Akhavan
- Qeshlaq-e Amrabad
- Sadabad-e Amlak
