= Ahmadabad-e Shahrak =

Yuxari Şehrek یوخاری شهرک
- Village
- Location within Iran
- Coordinates: 38°14′40″N 46°41′05″E
- Country: Iran
- Province: East Azerbaijan
- County: Heris
- Bakhsh: Khvajeh
- Rural District: Bedevostan-e Gharbi

Population (2006)
  - Total: 147
- Time zone: UTC+3:30 (IRST)
  - Summer (DST): UTC+4:30 (IRDT)

Ahmadabad-e Shahrak (Persian: احمدابادشهرك, also Romanized as Aḩmadābād-e Shahrak and Aḩmadābād Shahrak; also known as Shabrak, Shahrak-e Aḩmadābād, Shahrak-e Bālā, Shahrak-e Kohneh, and Verkhnyaya Shayryay) is a village in Bedevostan-e Gharbi Rural District, Khvajeh District, Heris County, East Azerbaijan Province, Iran. At the 2006 census, its population was 147, in 40 families.
