= Ahmadabad-e Abbaskhan =

Ahmadabad-e Abbaskhan احمدابادعباسخان
- Village
- Location within Iran
- Coordinates: 30°32′13″N 55°40′16″E
- Country: Iran
- Province: Kerman
- County: Rafsanjan
- Bakhsh: Koshkuiyeh
- Rural District: Koshkuiyeh

Population (2006)
  - Total: 126
- Time zone: UTC+3:30 (IRST)
  - Summer (DST): UTC+4:30 (IRDT)

Ahmadabad-e Abbaskhan (Persian: احمدابادعباسخان, also Romanized as Aḩmadābād-e ʿAbbāskhān) is a village in Koshkuiyeh Rural District, Koshkuiyeh District, Rafsanjan County, Kerman Province, Iran. At the 2006 census, its population was 126, in 33 families.
