= Ahmadabad-e Kateh =

Ahmadabad-e Kohpayeh احمدابادکوهپایه
- Village
- Location within Iran
- Coordinates: 29°55′55.2″N 52°59′25.5″E
- Country: Iran
- Province: Fars
- County: Marvdasht
- Bakhsh: Seyyedan
- Rural District: Rahmat

Population (2022)
  - Total: 900
- Time zone: UTC+3:30 (IRST)
  - Summer (DST): UTC+4:30 (IRDT)

'Ahmadabad-e Kohpayeh (Persian: احمد آباد کوهپایه, ') is a village in Rahmat Rural District, Seyyedan District, Marvdasht County, Fars province, Iran.
