= Ahmadabad-e Gurak =

Ahmadabad-e Gurak احمد آبا د گورک
- Village
- Location within Iran
- Coordinates: 27°08′03″N 59°10′49″E
- Country: Iran
- Province: Sistan and Baluchestan
- County: Dalgan
- Bakhsh: Jolgeh-ye Chah Hashem
- Rural District: Jolgeh-ye Chah Hashem

Population (2006)
  - Total: 939
- Time zone: UTC+3:30 (IRST)
  - Summer (DST): UTC+4:30 (IRDT)

Ahmadabad-e Gurak (Persian: احمد آبا د گورک, also Romanized as Aḩmadābād-e Gūrak; also known as Aḩmadābād) is a village in Jolgeh-ye Chah Hashem Rural District, Jolgeh-ye Chah Hashem District, Dalgan County, Sistan and Baluchestan Province, Iran. At the 2006 census, its population was 939, in 175 families.
