= Ahmadabad, Deyr =

Ahmadabad احمداباد
- Village
- Location within Iran
- Coordinates: 28°00′06″N 51°43′56″E
- Country: Iran
- Province: Bushehr
- County: Deyr
- Bakhsh: Central
- Rural District: Abdan

Population (2006)
  - Total: 94
- Time zone: UTC+3:30 (IRST)
  - Summer (DST): UTC+4:30 (IRDT)

Ahmadabad (Persian: احمداباد) (Note: Also romanized as Aḩmadābād; formerly known as Khar Gūneh (خرگونه), also romanized as Khar Gooneh; also known as Khar Gāneh) is a village in Abdan Rural District, in the Central District of Deyr County, Bushehr Province, Iran. At the 2006 census, its population was 94, in 13 families.
