= Ahmadabad, Rudkhaneh =

Ahmadabad احمد آباد
- Village
- Location within Iran
- Coordinates: 27°45′42″N 57°13′07″E
- Country: Iran
- Province: Hormozgan
- County: Rudan
- Bakhsh: Rudkhaneh
- Rural District: Rudkhaneh

Population (2006)
  - Total: 76
- Time zone: UTC+3:30 (IRST)
  - Summer (DST): UTC+4:30 (IRDT)

Ahmadabad (Persian: احمد آباد, also Romanized as Aḩmadābād) is a village in Rudkhaneh Rural District, Rudkhaneh District, Rudan County, Hormozgan Province, Iran. At the 2006 census, its population was 76, in 16 families.
