= Əhmədabad, Sabirabad =

Ahmedabad
- Municipality
- Location within Azerbaijan
- Coordinates: 40°00′22″N 48°38′34″E
- Country: Azerbaijan
- District: Sabirabad

Population
  - Total: 2,460
- Time zone: UTC+4 (AZT)
  - Summer (DST): UTC+5 (AZT)

Əhmədabad (also, Ahmedabad) is a village and municipality in the Sabirabad District of Azerbaijan. It has a population of 2,460.
