= Ahmadabad-e Tefli =

Ahmadabad-e Tefli احمدآباد تفلی
- Village
- Location within Iran
- Coordinates: 35°19′26″N 46°20′19″E
- Country: Iran
- Province: Kurdistan
- County: Sarvabad
- Bakhsh: Central
- Rural District: Razab

Population (2006)
  - Total: 317
- Time zone: UTC+3:30 (IRST)
  - Summer (DST): UTC+4:30 (IRDT)

Ahmadabad-e Tefli (Persian: احمدآباد تفلی, also Romanized as Aḩmadābād-e Teflī; also known as Aḩmadābād) is a village in Razab Rural District, in the Central District of Sarvabad County, Kurdistan Province, Iran. At the 2006 census, its population was 317, in 74 families. The village is populated by Kurds.
