= Baba Ahmad, West Azerbaijan =

Baba Ahmad بابااحمد
- Village
- Location within Iran
- Coordinates: 39°00′37″N 44°41′02″E
- Country: Iran
- Province: West Azerbaijan
- County: Chaldoran
- Bakhsh: Central
- Rural District: Baba Jik

Population (2006)
  - Total: 233
- Time zone: UTC+3:30 (IRST)
  - Summer (DST): UTC+4:30 (IRDT)

Baba Ahmad (Persian: بابااحمد, also Romanized as Bābā Aḩmad) is a village in Baba Jik Rural District, in the Central District of Chaldoran County, West Azerbaijan Province, Iran. At the 2006 census, its population was 233, in 43 families.
