= Ahmadabad-e Panjeh =

Ahmadabad-e Panjeh احمد آبا پنجه
- Village
- Location within Iran
- Coordinates: 35°06′58″N 47°28′32″E
- Country: Iran
- Province: Kurdistan
- County: Qorveh
- Bakhsh: Central
- Rural District: Panjeh Ali-ye Jonubi

Population (2006)
  - Total: 237
- Time zone: UTC+3:30 (IRST)
  - Summer (DST): UTC+4:30 (IRDT)

Ahmadabad-e Panjeh (Persian: احمد آبا پنجه, also Romanized as Aḩmadābād-e Panjeh; also known as Aḩmadābād and Aḩmadābād-e Panjeh ‘Alī) is a village in Panjeh Ali-ye Jonubi Rural District, in the Central District of Qorveh County, Kurdistan Province, Iran. At the 2006 census, its population was 237, in 47 families. The village is populated by Kurds.
