= Muzdurlar =

- Municipality
- Location within Azerbaijan
- Coordinates: 40°42′10″N 46°36′23″E
- Country: Azerbaijan
- Rayon: Goranboy

Population
  - Total: 1,362
- Time zone: UTC+4 (AZT)
  - Summer (DST): UTC+5 (AZT)

Muzdurlar is a village and municipality in the Goranboy Rayon of Azerbaijan. It has a population of 1,362. The municipality consists of the villages of Muzdurlar and Əhmədabad.
