= Ahmadabad, Kermanshah =

Ahmadabad احمداباد
- Village
- Location within Iran
- Coordinates: 34°06′29″N 46°58′24″E
- Country: Iran
- Province: Kermanshah
- County: Kermanshah
- Bakhsh: Firuzabad
- Rural District: Sar Firuzabad

Population (2006)
  - Total: 119
- Time zone: UTC+3:30 (IRST)
  - Summer (DST): UTC+4:30 (IRDT)

Ahmadabad (Persian: احمداباد, also Romanized as Aḩmadābād; also known as Aḩmadābād-e Mollā Mās, Sanqar Sāqī, and Sungar Sāqi) is a village in Sar Firuzabad Rural District, Firuzabad District, Kermanshah County, Kermanshah Province, Iran. At the 2006 census, its population was 119, in 26 families.
