= Ahmadabad-e Pol Abgineh =

Ahmadabad-e Pol Abgineh احمدابادپل ابگينه
- Village
- Location within Iran
- Coordinates: 29°34′02″N 51°45′00″E
- Country: Iran
- Province: Fars
- County: Kazerun
- Bakhsh: Central
- Rural District: Balyan

Population (2006)
  - Total: 713
- Time zone: UTC+3:30 (IRST)
  - Summer (DST): UTC+4:30 (IRDT)

Ahmadabad-e Pol Abgineh (Persian: احمدابادپل ابگينه, also Romanized as Aḩmadābād-e Pol Ābgīneh; also known as Aḩmadābād) is a village in Balyan Rural District, in the Central District of Kazerun County, Fars province, Iran. At the 2006 census, its population was 713, in 143 families.
