= Ahmadabad, Firuraq =

Ahmadabad احمداباد
- Village
- Location within Iran
- Coordinates: 38°33′50″N 44°42′41″E
- Country: Iran
- Province: West Azerbaijan
- County: Khoy
- Bakhsh: Central
- Rural District: Firuraq

Population (2006)
  - Total: 191
- Time zone: UTC+3:30 (IRST)
  - Summer (DST): UTC+4:30 (IRDT)

Ahmadabad (Persian: احمداباد, also Romanized as Aḩmadābād; also known as Khrābeh Badlān) is a village in Firuraq Rural District, in the Central District of Khoy County, West Azerbaijan Province, Iran. At the 2006 census, its population was 191, in 31 families.
