= Ahmadabad-e Sar Tang =

Ahmadabad-e Sar Tang احمدابادسرتنگ
- Village
- Location within Iran
- Coordinates: 32°02′43″N 49°24′46″E
- Country: Iran
- Province: Khuzestan
- County: Andika
- Bakhsh: Abezhdan
- Rural District: Abezhdan

Population (2006)
  - Total: 112
- Time zone: UTC+3:30 (IRST)
  - Summer (DST): UTC+4:30 (IRDT)

Ahmadabad-e Sar Tang (Persian: احمدابادسرتنگ, also Romanized as Aḩmadābād-e Sar Tang; also known as Sar Tang-e Dūlāb) is a village in Abezhdan Rural District, Abezhdan District, Andika County, Khuzestan Province, Iran. At the 2006 census, its population was 112, in 23 families.
