= Ahmadabad-e Do, Rayen =

Ahmadabad احمد آباد2
- Village
- Location within Iran
- Coordinates: 29°39′12″N 57°24′59″E
- Country: Iran
- Province: Kerman
- County: Kerman
- Bakhsh: Rayen
- Rural District: Rayen

Population (2006)
  - Total: 14
- Time zone: UTC+3:30 (IRST)
  - Summer (DST): UTC+4:30 (IRDT)

Ahmadabad (Persian: احمد آباد2, also Romanized as Aḩmadābād-e Do; also known as Aḩmadābād) is a village in Rayen Rural District, Rayen District, Kerman County, Kerman Province, Iran. At the 2006 census, its population was 14, in 4 families.
