= Ahmadabad, Dashtabi =

Village in Qazvin province, Iran

Ahmadabad Persian: احمدآباد
- Village
- Location within Iran
- Coordinates: 36°03′28″N 49°47′56″E
- Country: Iran
- Province: Qazvin
- County: Buin Zahra
- District: Dashtabi
- Rural District: Dashtabi-ye Gharbi

Population (2016)
  - Total: 669
- Time zone: UTC+3:30 (IRST)

Ahmadabad (Persian: احمدآباد) (Note: Also romanized as Aḩmadābād; also known as Akhmetabad) is a village in Dashtabi-ye Gharbi Rural District of Dashtabi District in Buin Zahra County, Qazvin province, Iran.

== Demographics ==
=== Population ===
At the time of the 2006 National Census, the village's population was 568 in 139 households. The following census in 2011 counted 648 people in 173 households. The 2016 census measured the population of the village as 669 people in 202 households.
