= Ahmadabad-e Sheykh =

Ahmadabad-e Sheykh احمدابادشيخ
- Village
- Location within Iran
- Coordinates: 35°37′37″N 59°14′13″E
- Country: Iran
- Province: Razavi Khorasan
- County: Torbat-e Heydarieh
- Bakhsh: Jolgeh Rokh
- Rural District: Bala Rokh

Population (2006)
  - Total: 208
- Time zone: UTC+3:30 (IRST)
  - Summer (DST): UTC+4:30 (IRDT)

Ahmadabad-e Sheykh (Persian: احمدابادشيخ, also Romanized as Aḩmadābād-e Sheykh; also known as Aḩmadābād and Kalāteh-ye Sheykh) is a village in Bala Rokh Rural District, Jolgeh Rokh District, Torbat-e Heydarieh County, Razavi Khorasan Province, Iran. At the 2006 census, its population was 208, in 57 families.

== See also ==
- List of cities, towns and villages in Razavi Khorasan Province
