= Ahmadvand, Kermanshah =

Ahmadvand احمدوند
- Village
- Location within Iran
- Coordinates: 34°28′18″N 47°03′06″E
- Country: Iran
- Province: Kermanshah
- County: Kermanshah
- Bakhsh: Central
- Rural District: Miyan Darband

Population (2006)
  - Total: 612
- Time zone: UTC+3:30 (IRST)
  - Summer (DST): UTC+4:30 (IRDT)

Ahmadvand (Persian: احمدوند, also Romanized as Aḩmadvand; also known as Aḩmadābād) is a village in Miyan Darband Rural District, in the Central District of Kermanshah County, Kermanshah Province, Iran. At the 2006 census, its population was 612, in 119 families.
