= Ahmadabad, Kowsar =

Village in Ardabil province, Iran

Ahmadabad Persian: احمداباد
- Village
- Location within Iran
- Coordinates: 37°37′10″N 48°08′11″E
- Country: Iran
- Province: Ardabil
- County: Kowsar
- District: Firuz
- Rural District: Zarjabad

Population (2016)
  - Total: 136
- Time zone: UTC+3:30 (IRST)

Ahmadabad (Persian: احمداباد) (Note: Also romanized as Aḩmadābād; also known as Akhmetabad) is a village in Zarjabad Rural District of Firuz District in Kowsar County, Ardabil province, Iran.

== Demographics ==
=== Population ===
At the time of the 2006 National Census, the village's population was 284 in 49 households. The following census in 2011 counted 251 people in 63 households. The 2016 census measured the population of the village as 136 people in 35 households.
