= Eyvanki Rural District =

Rural district in Semnan province, Iran

Eyvanki Rural District Persian: دهستان ايوانكي
- Rural District
- Location within Iran
- Coordinates: 35°22′N 52°05′E
- Country: Iran
- Province: Semnan
- County: Garmsar
- District: Eyvanki
- Established: 1993
- Capital: Cheshmeh Nadi

Population (2016)
  - Total: 3,645
- Time zone: UTC+3:30 (IRST)

Eyvanki Rural District (Persian: دهستان ايوانكي) is in Eyvanki District of Garmsar County, Semnan province, Iran. Its capital is the village of Cheshmeh Nadi.

== Demographics ==
=== Population ===
At the time of the 2006 National Census, the rural district's population was 2,791 in 795 households. There were 2,862 inhabitants in 882 households at the following census of 2011. The 2016 census measured the population of the rural district as 3,645 in 1,198 households. The most populous of its 74 villages was Shahrak-e Sanati-ye Aliabad, Semnan|Shahrak-e Sanati-ye Aliabad, with 660 people.

=== Other villages in the rural district ===
- Ahmadabad
- Beheshtabad
- Chandab
- Hoseynabad-e Korus
- Jannatabad
- Korak
- Shur Qazi
