= Ahmadabad-e Olya, Hamadan =

Ahmadabad-e Olya احمدابادعليا
- Village
- Location within Iran
- Coordinates: 34°18′14″N 48°06′01″E
- Country: Iran
- Province: Hamadan
- County: Nahavand
- Bakhsh: Khezel
- Rural District: Khezel-e Sharqi

Population (2006)
  - Total: 105
- Time zone: UTC+3:30 (IRST)
  - Summer (DST): UTC+4:30 (IRDT)

Ahmadabad-e Olya (Persian: احمدابادعليا, also Romanized as Aḩmadābād-e ‘Olyā; also known as Aḩmadābād) is a village in Khezel-e Sharqi Rural District, Khezel District, Nahavand County, Hamadan Province, Iran. At the 2006 census, its population was 105, in 26 families.
