= Ahmadabad, Andika =

Ahmadabad احمداباد
- Village
- Location within Iran
- Coordinates: 32°13′36″N 49°24′07″E
- Country: Iran
- Province: Khuzestan
- County: Andika
- Bakhsh: Central
- Rural District: Qaleh-ye Khvajeh

Population (2006)
  - Total: 179
- Time zone: UTC+3:30 (IRST)
  - Summer (DST): UTC+4:30 (IRDT)

Ahmadabad (Persian: احمداباد, also Romanized as Aḩmadābād; also known as Aḩmad Badal, Aḩmad Balab, Aḩmad Balad, and Bābā Aḩmad) is a village in Qaleh-ye Khvajeh Rural District, in the Central District of Andika County, Khuzestan Province, Iran. At the 2006 census, its population was 179, in 32 families.
