= Ahmadabad-e Olya, East Azerbaijan =

Ahmadabad-e Olya احمدابادعليا
- Village
- Location within Iran
- Coordinates: 37°50′33″N 47°22′39″E
- Country: Iran
- Province: East Azerbaijan
- County: Sarab
- Bakhsh: Central
- Rural District: Abarghan

Population (2006)
  - Total: 15
- Time zone: UTC+3:30 (IRST)
  - Summer (DST): UTC+4:30 (IRDT)

Ahmadabad-e Olya (Persian: احمدابادعليا, also Romanized as Aḩmadābād-e ‘Olyā; also known as Aḩmadābād-e Bālā) is a village in Abarghan Rural District, in the Central District of Sarab County, East Azerbaijan Province, Iran. At the 2006 census, its population was 15, in 4 families.
