= Ahmadabad-e Olya, Kermanshah =

Ahmadabad-e Olya احمدابادعليا
- Village
- Location within Iran
- Coordinates: 34°33′24″N 46°56′32″E
- Country: Iran
- Province: Kermanshah
- County: Kermanshah
- Bakhsh: Central
- Rural District: Miyan Darband

Population (2006)
  - Total: 83
- Time zone: UTC+3:30 (IRST)
  - Summer (DST): UTC+4:30 (IRDT)

Ahmadabad-e Olya (Persian: احمدابادعليا, also Romanized as Aḩmadābād-e ‘Olyā; also known as Aḩmadābād-e Bālā) is a village in Miyan Darband Rural District, in the Central District of Kermanshah County, Kermanshah Province, Iran. At the 2006 census, its population was 83, in 19 families.
