= Ahmadabad-e Daryab =

Ahmadabad-e Daryab احمداباددارياب
- Village
- Location within Iran
- Coordinates: 34°17′24″N 48°01′53″E
- Country: Iran
- Province: Hamadan
- County: Nahavand
- Bakhsh: Khezel
- Rural District: Khezel-e Sharqi

Population (2006)
  - Total: 47
- Time zone: UTC+3:30 (IRST)
  - Summer (DST): UTC+4:30 (IRDT)

Ahmadabad-e Daryab (Persian: احمداباددارياب, also Romanized as Aḩmadābād-e Dāryāb; also known as Aḩmadābād, Aḩmadābād-e Pā’īn, and Aḩmadābād-e Soflá) is a village in Khezel-e Sharqi Rural District, Khezel District, Nahavand County, Hamadan Province, Iran. At the 2006 census, its population was 47, in 12 families.
