= Ahmadabad-e Sofla, East Azerbaijan =

Ahmadabad-e Sofla احمدابادسفلي
- Village
- Location within Iran
- Coordinates: 37°50′56″N 47°23′01″E
- Country: Iran
- Province: East Azerbaijan
- County: Sarab
- Bakhsh: Central
- Rural District: Abarghan

Population (2006)
  - Total: 416
- Time zone: UTC+3:30 (IRST)
  - Summer (DST): UTC+4:30 (IRDT)

Ahmadabad-e Sofla (Persian: احمدابادسفلي, also Romanized as Aḩmadābād-e Soflá; also known as Aḩmadābād-e Pā’īn) is a village in Abarghan Rural District, in the Central District of Sarab County, East Azerbaijan Province, Iran. At the 2006 census, its population was 416, in 78 families.
