= Ahmadabad-e Leyqoli =

Ahmadabad-e Leyqoli احمدابادليقلي
- Village
- Location within Iran
- Coordinates: 38°12′57″N 46°51′28″E
- Country: Iran
- Province: East Azerbaijan
- County: Heris
- Bakhsh: Khvajeh
- Rural District: Bedevostan-e Gharbi

Population (2006)
  - Total: 62
- Time zone: UTC+3:30 (IRST)
  - Summer (DST): UTC+4:30 (IRDT)

Ahmadabad-e Leyqoli (Persian: احمدابادليقلي, also Romanized as Aḩmadābād-e Leyqolī and Aḩmadābād Leyqolī; also known as Aḩmadābād-e Soflá, Aḩmadābād, Akhmetabad, Leqlī, Ligli, and Lygly) is a village in Bedevostan-e Gharbi Rural District, Khvajeh District, Heris County, East Azerbaijan Province, Iran. At the 2006 census, its population was 62, in 18 families.
