= Ahmadabad-e Sofla, Kermanshah =

Ahmadabad-e Sofla احمدابادسفلي
- Village
- Location within Iran
- Coordinates: 34°32′35″N 46°56′34″E
- Country: Iran
- Province: Kermanshah
- County: Kermanshah
- Bakhsh: Central
- Rural District: Miyan Darband

Population (2006)
  - Total: 66
- Time zone: UTC+3:30 (IRST)
  - Summer (DST): UTC+4:30 (IRDT)

Ahmadabad-e Sofla (Persian: احمدابادسفلي, also Romanized as Aḩmadābād-e Soflá; also known as Aḩmadābād-e Pā'īn) is a village in Miyan Darband Rural District, in the Central District of Kermanshah County, Kermanshah Province, Iran. At the 2006 census, its population was 66, in 17 families.
