= Eyvanki District =

District in Semnan province, Iran

Eyvanki District Persian: بخش ایوانکی
- District
- Location within Iran
- Coordinates: 35°22′N 52°05′E
- Country: Iran
- Province: Semnan
- County: Garmsar
- Capital: Eyvanki

Population (2016)
  - Total: 17,163
- Time zone: UTC+3:30 (IRST)

Eyvanki District (Persian: بخش ایوانکی) is in Garmsar County, Semnan province, Iran. Its capital is the city of Eyvanki.

== Demographics ==
=== Language ===
Tati is the main language of the district.

=== Population ===
At the time of the 2006 National Census, the district's population was 13,187 in 3,555 households. The following census in 2011 counted 14,857 people in 4,466 households. The 2016 census measured the population of the district as 17,163 inhabitants in 5,817 households.

=== Administrative divisions ===
Eyvanki District Population
| Administrative Divisions | 2006 | 2011 | 2016 |
|---|---|---|---|
| Eyvanki RD | 2,791 | 2,862 | 3,645 |
| Eyvanki (city) | 10,396 | 11,995 | 13,518 |
| Total | 13,187 | 14,857 | 17,163 |
RD = Rural District
