= Central District (Varamin County) =

District in Tehran province, Iran

Central District (Varamin County) Persian: بخش مرکزی شهرستان ورامین
- District
- Location within Iran
- Coordinates: 35°20′N 51°34′E
- Country: Iran
- Province: Tehran
- County: Varamin
- Capital: Varamin

Population (2016)
  - Total: 258,752
- Time zone: UTC+3:30 (IRST)

The Central District of Varamin County (Persian: بخش مرکزی شهرستان ورامین) is in Tehran province, Iran. Its capital is the city of Varamin. The previous capital of the district was the city of Qarchak, now the capital of Qarchak County.

== Demographics ==
=== Population ===
At the time of the 2006 National Census, the district's population was 232,393 in 59,390 households. The following census in 2011 counted 271,738 people in 70,715 households. The 2016 census measured the population of the district as 258,752 inhabitants in 78,063 households.

=== Administrative divisions ===
Central District (Varamin County) Population
Administrative Divisions	2006	2011	2016
Behnampazuki-ye Jonubi RD	12,940	41,609	21,638
Behnamvasat-e Shomali RD	10,884	11,138	11,486
Varamin (city)	208,569	218,991	225,628
Total	232,393	271,738	258,752
RD = Rural District
