= Zaza–Gorani languages =

Branch of northwestern Iranian languages

Zaza–Gorani
- زازا-گۆرانی
- (Proposed)
- Geographic distribution: Turkey (Zaza); Iran and Iraq (Gorani)
- Native speakers: Zaza 1.5 million Gorani 300,000
- Linguistic classification: Indo-European: Indo-Iranian; Iranian; Western; Northwestern; Adharic?; Zaza–Gorani
- Subdivisions: Zaza; Gorani (Hawrami)

Language codes

Zaza and Gorani are two languages belonging to the Northwestern Iranian branch of the Iranian languages. The archaic linguistic features of the two languages have led some researchers to propose that they form a Zaza-Gorani subgroup.

== Classification ==
The proposed Zaza–Gorani languages are the Zaza languages and the Gorani dialects. The Zaza language is defined as a macrolanguage consisting of two distinct individual languages; Southern Zaza and Northern Zaza, which are distinguished primarily by their phonological differences and spoken in various regions of Turkey. The Gorani dialects, on the other hand, consist of Shabaki, Hawrami, Bajelani, Kakayi and Sarli, spoken in small pockets in Iran and Iraq. Both the Zaza languages and the Gorani dialects are classified as Northwestern Iranian languages in their own right by international linguistic authorities and many other linguists and Iranologists.

== Speakers ==
The Zaza language is the ancestral language of Zazas and the Zaza people are traditionally considered to be descendants of the Daylamites, a medieval martial society indigenous to Northern Iran who progressively expanded their presence into Anatolia during the medieval period. The Gorani dialects, on the other hand, are spoken by Gorans (Shabaks, Bajalans) and it is hypothesized within historical linguistics that the Gorani-speaking communities underwent a collective displacement from the Caspian basin to their current geographic localities during an undocumented period of early history. According to some, most of their speakers consider themselves ethnic Kurds. However, many Zazas and Gorans oppose it and emphasize their own separate identity distinct from the Kurds.

== Criticism ==
Despite the some similarities, there are significant linguistic differences between the Zaza and Gurani languages. Due to these differences, there is no generally accepted view that the Zaza and Gurani languages together form a Zaza-Gorani group on their own in contrast to other Northwestern language groups. The significant linguistic differences between the Zaza and Gorani languages were first noted by Karl Hadank, the first linguist to linguistically study and analyze the Zaza language. Hadank, in the Zâzâ und Gûrânî section of his prominent work, Mundarten der Zâzâ, demonstrated significant linguistic differences between Zaza and Gorani, including important phonological differences, differences and deviations in tense structures, conjugation systems and verbal particles and in glossaries and gender, the very clear gender declension in Zaza, including verb conjugations in contrast to the almost complete absence of gender in Gurani, in prefixs and suffixs, the absence of determinative suffixes in Zaza in contrast to Gorani's explicit use of them, Gorani's characteristic prepositions that Zazaca does not possess. Linguistic features that are assumed to unite Zaza and Gorani are also found in languages and dialects such as Semnani, Tati, Balochi, Talysh and Gilaki. Zaza, shows obvious parallels to Caspian languages (Iranian languages of the Caspian region) that Gurani lacks. Therefore, it has been noted multiple times that there is quite insufficient evidence to substantiate the Zaza-Gorani subgroup, as is often assumed, existing similarities do not imply that Zaza and Gorani ever formed a historical unit and no unifying characteristics have been found from Zaza and the Gorani group to demonstrate that they constitute a group on their own in contrast to other Northwestern language groups.

== Bibliography ==
- Werner, Eberhard (2017). Rivers and Mountains: A Historical, Applied Anthropological and Linguistical Study of the Zaza People of Turkey Including an Introduction to Applied Cultural Anthropology. Nuremberg: Verlag Fur Theologie Und Religionswissenschaft. ISBN 978-3957760654.
- Arakelova, Victoria (1999), "The Zaza People as a New Ethno-Political Factor in the Region", Iran & the Caucasus, 3/4: 397–408, doi:10.1163/157338499X00335, ISSN 1573-384X, JSTOR 4030804
- Minorsky, Vladimir (1943). "The Gūrān". Bulletin of the School of Oriental and African Studies, University of London. 11 (1): 75–103. doi:10.1017/S0041977X00071226. JSTOR 609206.
- MacKenzie, David Neil (2002). "GURĀNI". Encyclopædia Iranica. Archived from the original on 12 June 2025.
- Blau, Joyce (1989). "Gurânî et Zâzâ". In Schmitt, Rüdiger (ed.). Compendium Linguarum Iranicarum. Wiesbaden: Reichert. pp. 336–340. ISBN 3-88226-413-6. (About Daylamite origin of Zazas and Guranis)

== Gallery ==
Partial tree of Indo-European languages.

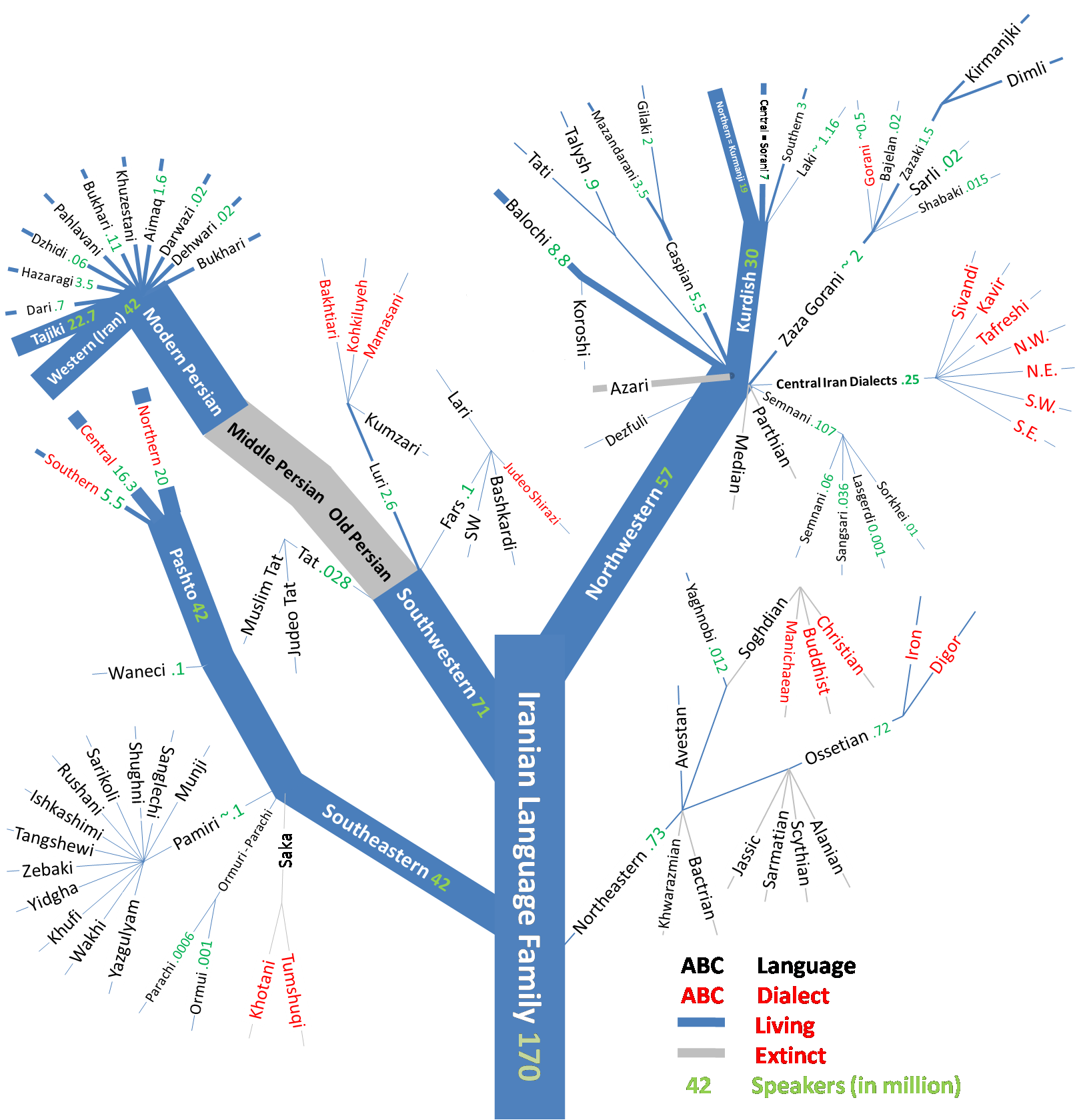
Position of Zaza-Gorani languages in Iranian Languages
