= Zaza language =

Northwestern Iranian language spoken in Turkey

Zaza
- Zazaki
- Pronunciation: Zaza pronunciation: [zazaki]
- Native to: Turkey
- Region: Parts of Anatolia (primarily in Eastern Anatolia) and Zaza diaspora in Europe (primarily in Germany)
- Ethnicity: Zazas
- Native speakers: 4.5 million (2025)
- Language family: Indo-European: Indo-Iranian; Iranian; Western; Northwestern; Adharic?; Zaza–Gorani?; Zaza
- Dialects: Southern Zaza; Sivereki; Kori; Motki; Dumbuli; Hazzu; Northern Zaza; Tunceli; Varto; Eastern/Central Zaza; Palu; Bingöl; Elazığ
- Writing system: Latin script

Language codes
- ISO 639-2: zza
- ISO 639-3: zza – inclusive code Individual codes: kiu – Kirmanjki (Northern Zaza) diq – Dimli (Southern Zaza)
- Glottolog: zaza1246 Zaza
- ELP: Dimli
- Linguasphere: 58-AAA-ba
- The position of Zaza among Iranian languages

- Zaza is classified as Vulnerable by the UNESCO; Atlas of the World's Languages in Danger

Zaza (endonym: Zazakî, Dimlî, Dimilkî, Kirmanckî, Kirdkî, Zonê ma, lit. 'Our language'), also known by its endonym Zazaki, is an Iranic language or group of languages belonging to the Northwestern Iranian branch and spoken in various regions of Turkey by the Zaza people. The language comprises three primary varieties; northern, southern, and central and these varieties are spoken in Bingöl, Elazığ, Erzincan, Erzurum, Malatya, Muş, Bitlis and Tunceli provinces in Eastern Anatolia; Adıyaman, Diyarbakır and Şanlıurfa provinces in Southeastern Anatolia; Kars and Ardahan in Northeastern Anatolia; Sivas, Kayseri, Aksaray in Central Anatolia and Tokat and Gümüşhane in Black Sea regions of Turkey. Leading linguistic authorities, including SIL Global, Glottolog and Ethnologue, categorize the language into distinct northern and southern varieties, which are further delineated by extensive sub-dialectal variation.

In terms of morphosyntactic structure, core lexicon and diachronic development, the Zaza language demonstrates a close linguistic affiliation with Tati, Talysh, Sangsari, Semnani, Mazandarani and Gilaki. Furthermore, the language exhibits significant grammatical affinities with Parthian and Bactrian, two ancient and extinct Iranian languages spoken in antiquity. The glossonym Zaza originated as a pejorative. According to Ethnologue, Zaza is spoken by around 1.48 million people, and the language is considered threatened due to a declining number of speakers, with many shifting to Turkish. Nevins, however, puts the number of Zaza speakers between two and three million.

== Macrolanguage ==
Zaza is recognized as a macrolanguage by international linguistic authorities. SIL International classifies the Zaza language as a macrolanguage, including the varieties of Southern Zaza (diq) and Northern Zaza (kiu). Other international linguistic authorities, Ethnologue and Glottolog, also categorize the Zaza language as a macrolanguage composed of two distinct individual languages: Southern Zaza and Northern Zaza.

== Classification ==
The first linguist to linguistically study and analyze the Zaza language was the German linguist Oskar Mann. Commissioned by the Prussian Academy of Sciences in 1905/1906 to document and linguistically analyze the Western Iranian languages, Oskar Mann undertook comprehensive lexical compilation and linguistic documentation of the Zaza language in the Bingöl and Siverek regions. He analyzed the Zaza language from phonological, morphological, lexical and etymological aspects and demonstrated that Zaza is a northwestern Iranian language in its own right, among the Iranian languages. His work was subsequently published by Karl Hadank, who also classified Zaza as a language in its own right among the Northwestern Iranian languages. Since then, the language has been classified as a northwestern Iranian language in its own right among the Northwest Iranian languages and is classified as a distinct northwestern Iranian language by international linguistic authorities. Ethnologue classifies Zaza within a genetic subgroup called Zaza-Gorani, along with Gorani, within the Northwestern Iranian languages. However, this classification is contested. There are significant linguistic differences between the Zaza and Gorani languages, despite some similarities. Zaza also shares many linguistic structures with the Caspian languages that are not found in Gorani. No unifying characteristics have been found from Zaza and the Gorani group to demonstrate that they constitute a group on their own in contrast to other Northwestern language groups.

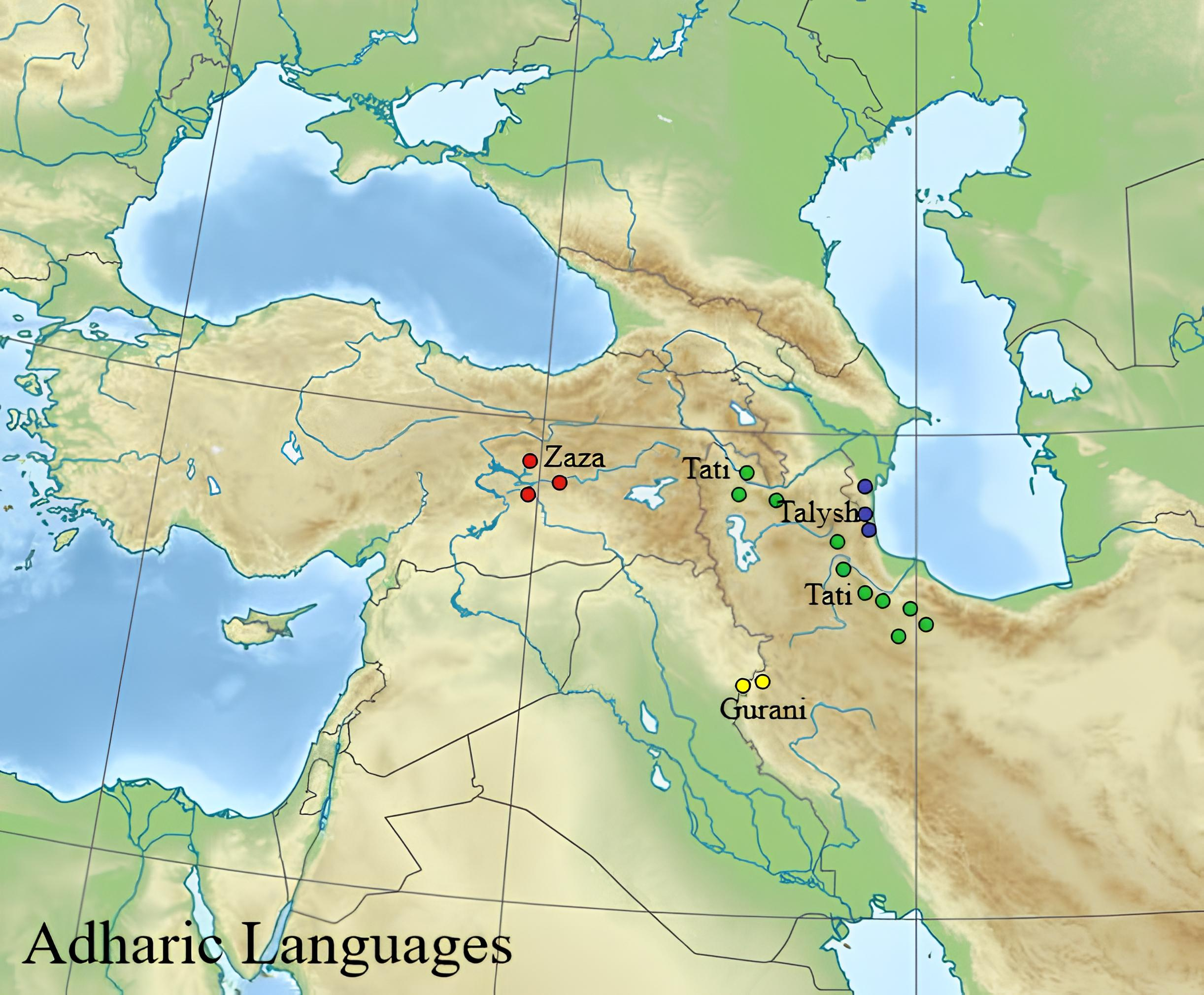
Adharic languages

The Glottolog database proposes a more detailed classification and classifies Zaza within the Adharic subgroup (related to Old Azeri), along with languages such as Talysh, Tati and its dialects such as Harzandi, Kajali and Kilit, spoken on the southern shores of the Caspian Sea. Belgian philologist and Iranologist Pièrre Lecoq classifies Zaza within the Medo-Caspian subgroup along with languages such as Tati, Talysh, Gilaki, Semnani and Balochi. German linguist Jost Gippert, has demonstrated that the Zaza language is very closely related to the Parthian language in terms of phonetics, morphology, syntax and lexicon and that it has many words in common with the Parthian language. According to him, the Zaza language may be a relic dialect of the Parthian language that has survived to the present day. He classifies Zaza within the Hyrcanian subgroup, referring to the historical Hyrcania region south of the Caspian Sea, and includes languages such as Sangsari and Balochi in the same subgroup as Zaza. Gippert also demonstrated that the Zaza language is genetically very close to Semnani and suggested that both languages may have originated from a common ancestor. According to linguists Stilo, Paul and Windfuhr the Zaza language is a Northwestern Iranian language in its own right among the Northwestern Iranian languages. And according to Paul, it is linguistically close to Tati and its dialects (modern Azeri dialects), Talysh and Gorani. Instead of grouping Zaza in the same subgroup with another language, Stilo, Paul and Windfuhr classify Zaza as a standalone language within the Northwestern Iranian languages. Encyclopædia Iranica classifies the Zaza language within the Caspian subgroup of the Northwestern Iranian languages, along with Talysh, Tati dialects, Harzandi, Gilaki, Mazanderani, Gurani and Semnani dialects and states that historically all of these Caspian dialects are related to the Parthian language. The Glottolog database proposes the following phylogenetic classification:

- Northwestern Iranian
  - Adharic (Azeri)
    - Adhari (Old Azeri)
    - Zaza (Zaza)
      - Southern Zaza (Dimli) (Dumbuli, Hazzu, Kori, Motki, Sivereki)
      - Northern Zaza (Kirmanjki) (Tunceli, Varto)
    - Tatic (Tati-Talysh)
      - Alamuti
      - Central Tat: Khalkhali (Kajali), Karanic [Diz, Gandomabi, Hezarrudi Karan (Khoresh-e Rostam) Karnaq, Kelasi, Lerd, Nowkiani], Shahrudi -Southern Talysh ([Shali-Kolur, Shandermani, Southern Talysh, Massali Masulei]), Khoini, Maraghei [Dikini], North-Central Talysh (Central Talysh [Asalemi, Hashtpari], Northern Talysh [Astara, Lenkoran, Lerik], Taromic [Kabate, Kalasi, Upper Taromi]
      - Northern Tatic: Harzandi-Kilit (Harzandi, Kilit), Karingani-Kalasuri-Khoynarudi (Karingani, Kalasuri-Khoynarudi)
      - Southern Tatic: Alviri-Vidari (Alviri, Vidari), Vafsic (Ashtiani [Amorei, Kahaki, Nuclear Ashtiani, Tafresh], Vafsi), Ramand-Karaj: Eshtehardi, Razajerdi,Takestani (Khalkhal, Kharaqani, Ramandi, Tarom, Zanjan)
    - Gurani (Gorani) [Gurani Shabaki-Bajelani (Bajelani, Chabak, Sarli)]

The Zaza language is considered a branch of the Kurdic subgroup within the Northwestern Iranian languages in a study. The varieties of Kurdic do not directly descend from any known Middle Iranian languages, such as Middle Persian or Parthian, or from Old Iranian languages, such as Avestan or Old Persian. Zaza is considered a macrolanguage, consisting of Southern and Northern Zaza. Glottolog database classifies Zaza under the Adharic branch of Northwestern Iranian languages Some, such as Ludwig Paul, do not consider Zazaki and Gorani to be Kurdish dialects. According to him, they can only be classified as Kurdish dialects in a political and ethnic context, and it would be more accurate to refer to them as Kurdish languages. The differences between them arise from the Kurdish adoption of Persian linguistic features due to historical contact. Furthermore, arguments regarding the classification of both Zazaki and Gorani highlight that the distinction between a dialect and a language is a social construct influenced by factors such as shared identity, history, beliefs, and living conditions, rather than being based solely on linguistic evidence. Therefore, Kurdish can be seen as a socio-cultural umbrella that encompasses both recognized Kurdish dialects (such as Kurmanji, Sorani, and Southern Kurdish) as well as the Zaza and Gorani languages. The term "Kurdic" is used to refer to this broad grouping.

== Endangerment ==
In 2010, Zaza was classified as a "vulnerable" language by UNESCO. Many Zaza speakers resided in conflict-affected regions of eastern Turkey and have been significantly impacted by both the current and historical political situations. Only a few elderly monolingual Zaza speakers remain, while the younger generation predominantly speaks other languages. Turkish laws enacted from the mid-1920s until 1991 banned Kurdish language, including Zazaki, from being spoken in public, written down, or published. The Turkish state's efforts to enforce the use of Turkish have led many Zaza speakers to leave Turkey and migrate to other countries, primarily Germany, Sweden, Netherlands and the United States, and Australia. Efforts to preserve and revitalize Zazaki are ongoing. Many Kurdish writers in Turkey are fighting to save Zazaki with children's books and others with newspapers, but the language faces an uncertain future. The decline of Zazaki speakers could also lead the Zazas to lose their identity and shift to a Turkish identity. According to a study conducted in Dersim province, respondents younger than 18 mostly stated their ethnicity as 'Turk', their mother language as 'Turkish', and their religion as 'Islam', despite having some proficiency in Zaza.

== History ==
Writing in Zaza is a recent phenomenon. The first literary work in Zaza is Mewlîdu'n-Nebîyyî'l-Qureyşîyyî by Ehmedê Xasi in 1899, followed by the work Mawlûd by Osman Efendîyo Babij in 1903. As the Kurdish language was banned in Turkey during a large part of the Republican period, no text was published in Zaza until 1963. That year saw the publication of two short texts by the Kurdish newspaper Roja Newe, but the newspaper was banned and no further publication in Zaza took place until 1976, when periodicals published a few Zaza texts. Modern Zaza literature appeared for the first time in the journal Tîrêj in 1979 but the journal had to close as a result of the 1980 coup d'état. Throughout the 1980s and 1990s, most Zaza literature was published in Germany, France and especially Sweden until the ban on the Kurdish language was lifted in Turkey in 1991. This meant that newspapers and journals began publishing in Zaza again. The next book to be published in Zaza (after Mawlûd in 1903) was in 1977, and two more books were published in 1981 and 1986. From 1987 to 1990, five books were published in Zaza. The publication of books in Zaza increased after the ban on the Kurdish language was lifted and a total of 43 books were published from 1991 to 2000. As of 2018, at least 332 books have been published in Zaza.

Due to the above-mentioned obstacles, the standardization of Zaza could not have taken place and authors chose to write in their local or regional Zaza variety. In 1996, however, a group of Zaza-speaking authors gathered in Stockholm and established a common alphabet and orthographic rules which they published. Some authors nonetheless do not abide by these rules as they do not apply the orthographic rules in their oeuvres.

The institution of Higher Education of Turkey approved the opening of the Zaza Language and Literature Department in Munzur University in 2011 and began accepting students in 2012 for the department. In the following year, Bingöl University established the same department. TRT Kurdî also broadcast in the language. Some TV channels which broadcast in Zaza were closed after the 2016 coup d'état attempt.

== Dialects ==
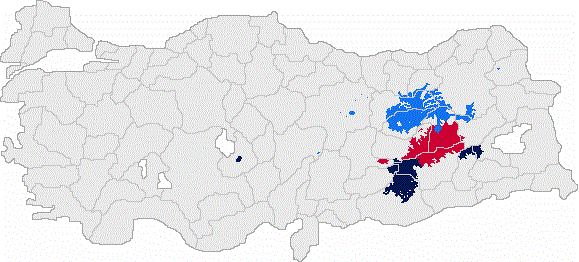
Northern Zaza Central or Eastern Zaza Southern Zaza

There are three primary Zaza varieties: southern, northern and central or eastern Zaza. International linguistic authorities categorize Southern and Northern Zaza as two individual Zaza languages within the Zaza macrolanguage, rather than dialects. The sectarian difference of Zazas is reflected in the dialectal differences of the Zaza language; the northern dialect of the language is spoken by Alevi Zazas, the southern dialect by Hanafi Zazas, and the central dialect by Shafi Zazas. In addition to these dialects, there are transitional dialects and edge accents that have a special position and cannot be fully included in any dialect group. The southern dialect is spoken in the southeastern and central parts of Anatolia. The central dialect is spoken predominantly in eastern Anatolia. The northern dialect, is spoken in the eastern and northeastern parts of Anatolia. In terms of linguistics, the southern dialect of the language and some transitional dialects have a more conservative (archaic) structure than other varieties. The distinctive differences between Central/Eastern Zaza, Southern Zaza and Northern Zaza are primarily rooted in their phonology and morphology.

=== Southern Zaza ===
Southern Zaza ([diq]/diml1238) is one of the three primary varieties of the Zaza language. It is classified as one of the two individual Zaza languages of the Zaza macrolanguage. Glottolog divides Southern Zaza into five sub-dialects: Dumbuli, Hazzu, Kori, Motki and Sivereki. It is spoken predominantly in Siverek, Çermik, Çüngüş, Gerger, Mutki, Aksaray, Ergani and Kulp. The southern dialect has a more conservative (archaic) structure than other dialects.

=== Central or Eastern Zaza ===
Central or Eastern Zaza ([diq]) is one of the three primary varieties of the Zaza language. It is spoken predominantly in Palu, Bingöl, Hani, Lice, Silvan, Solhan and Muş.

=== Northern Zaza ===
Northern Zaza ([kiu]/kirm1248) is one of the three primary varieties of the Zaza language. It is also known as "Kirmancki/Kirmanjki", as this is the name traditionally used for Zaza by some of its northern speakers, especially in Dersim and amongst Alevis. The name should not be confused with Kurmanji although they share an etymological root. It is classified as of the two individual Zaza languages of the Zaza macrolanguage. Glottolog divides Northern Zaza into two sub-dialects: Tunceli and Varto. It is spoken predominantly in Erzincan, Kemah, Aşkale, Hozat, Hınıs, Kelkit, Nazimiye, Ovacık, Pülümür, Tekman, Tercan, Varto and Yayladere.

== Grammar ==
In terms of grammar, genetics, linguistics (diachronic) and core vocabulary the Zaza language is closely related to the Old Azeri, Tati of Iran, Talysh, Sangsari, Semnani, Mazandarani and Gilaki languages spoken on the shores of the Caspian Sea and northern Iran. Zaza also has distinctive and significant grammatical similarities with the Parthian and Bactrian languages, which are two Iranian languages of late antiquity. Zaza, along with Talysh, Tati, Semnani, Sangsari, Gilaki and some other central Iranian dialects, forms a belt of Northwestern Iranian languages among the Northwestern Iranian languages. This belt is geographically divided by speakers of Persian, Azerbaijani and Kurdish into two parts: the Zaza, Talysh and Tati languages in the western part and Semnani, Sangsari, Gilaki (and other Caspian/Central dialects) in the eastern part. The Zaza language, along with Tati, Talysh and some northwestern dialects, has strongly preserved its Northwestern Iranian isogloss roots and is quite distant from Persian and Kurdish. Overall, from Zaza, Tat and Talysh downward to Kurdish and Persian, the Western Iranian languages are successively less "archaic". Zaza, along with Talysh and Tati, is located at the westernmost part of the Western Iranian languages while Persian and Kurdish are positioned at the easternmost part:

Proto-IE	Parthian	Gurani	Tati	Zaza	Talysh	Semnani	Caspian	Central dia.	Balochi	Kurdish	Persian
*ḱ/ĝ	s/z	s/z	s/z	s/z	s/z	s/z	s/z	s/z	s/z	s/z	h/d
*k(^{u})^{pal}	-ž-	-ž-	-ž-	-ĵ-	-ž	-ĵ,ž-	-ĵ-	-ĵ-,ž,z	-ĵ-	-ž-	-z-
*g^{u}(h)^{pal}	ž	ž	ž (y-)	ĵ	ž	ĵ,ž	ĵ	ĵ,ž,z	ĵ	ž	z
*kw^{29}	?	sip	isb	esb	asb	esp	s	esb	?	s	s
*tr/*tl	hr	(ya)r	(h)r	(hi)r	(h)*r	(h)r	r	r	s	s	s
*d(h)w	b	b	b	b	b	b	b	b	d	d	d
*rd/*rz	r/rz	l, rz	r/rz	r/rz	rz	l/l(rz)	l/l	l/l(rz)	l/l	l/l	l/l
*sw	wx	w	h	w	h	x(u)	x(u)	x(u),f	v	x(w)	x(u)
*tw	f	u	u	w	h	h	h	h(u)	h	h	h
*y-	y-	y-	y-	ĵ-	ĵ-	ĵ-	ĵ-	ĵ- (y-)	ĵ-	ĵ-	ĵ-

Similar to most other languages of the belt, the Zaza language shows a two-case system in the nouns with an oblique ending generally going back to the Old Iranian language genitive ending /*-ahya/. Linguist W. B. Henning demonstrated about a 100 years ago that Zaza, Talysh, Tati, Semnani and Gilaki, and the Caspian dialects derive their present stem from the same old Iranian present participle ending in /*-ant/. Henning also demonstrated that the Harzandi dialect of the Tati language has many common linguistic features with Zaza and Talysh and classified it as a transitional dialect between Zaza and Tati/Talysh. Zaza, Talysh, Tati, Semnani, Gilaki, Mazanderani and some other Caspian dialects derive their present stem from the same old Iranian present participle ending in /*-ant/:

English	Zaza	Semnani (Note: Aftari)	Gilaki	Tati (Note: Harzandi)	Talysh
"to go"	ši-n-	še-nn-	šu-n-	še-nd-	še-d-
"to come"	ye-n-	ā-nn-	ā-n-	āmā-nd-	ome-d-
"to do"	ke-n-	ke-nn-	kū-n-	kö-nd-	kerd-ed-
"to say"	vā-n-	vā-nn-	gū-n-	ot-n-	vot-ed-
"to see"	vīn-en-	?	ī-n-	vīn-n-	vīn-d-

English	Zaza	Semnani (Note: Aftari)	Gilaki	Mazanderani	Sangsari	Tati (Note: Harzandi)	Talysh
1s "to go"	ši-n-ā	še-nn-ī	šu-n-em	šu-mm-a	šu-nd-ī	še-nd-en	še-d-em
3s "to do"	ke-n-o	ke-nn-e	ku-n-e	kar-n-e	ke-nd-e	ko-nd-e	kerd-ed-e
3s "to go"	šo-n-o	šo-nn-e	šu-n-e	šo-n-e	šu-nd-e	še-nd-e	še-d-e

Morphologically, the derivation of present-stem bases from the Old Iranian present participle /*-ant/ constitutes a primary diagnostic feature distinguishing Zaza, Tati, Talysh, Gilaki, Semnani, Mazandarani and other Caspian languages from the Southwestern Iranian structural patterns of Persian and Kurdish. In contrast to these languages, in Kurdish and Persian the present tense is formed by adding modal prefixes of the Southwest Iranian structure to the present tense verb root, such as می mi- (mi-ravam) in Persian and -di (di-çim) (I go) in Kurdish. Although the tense suffix -mm in Mazanderani presents an ostensibly divergent morphological structure from /*-ant/, it constitutes an assimilated realization of the /-n/ morpheme that descends from the /*-ant/ root; gu-nn-ma > gu-n-ma > gu-mm-a, šu-nn-me, > šu-n-me > šu-mm-e.

=== Kinship markers ===
Morphologically, similar to most of the languages of the belt, the dialects of the Zaza language show two-case system of nouns. In Zaza, the oblique ending /-ī/ (that going back to the Old Iranian language genitive ending /*-ahya/ is only attached to masculines. In Southern Zaza (Çermik-Siverek dialects) there is an ending /-(e)r/ attached to feminine nouns in the oblique case and its origin is the old stem expansion in /*-(a)r/ of relationship terms. Zaza /-(e)r/ actually denoting the oblique case of relationship terms of both genders, probably have started spreading to feminines in general later. Similar to Zaza, in Tati dialects, the oblique case of relationship terms /-r/ also has spread from relationship terms to other terms. Similar to Zaza, other members of the belt, Talysh, Semnani, Tati also have the same oblique case of relationship terms:

	father dir	father obl
Zaza	pī	pēr
Talysh	pə	pār
Tati	pia	piar
Semnani	pia	piär
Middle Persian	pid	pidar

	mother dir	mother obl
Zaza	mā	mār
Talysh	mā	moār
Tati	mâ	mâr
Semnani	me	mār
Middle Persian	mād	mādar

Additionally, mother (dir) and mother (obl) are mā -> mār in Zaza, mâ -> mâr in Tati, mā -> moār in Talysh and brother (dir) and brother (obl) are bıra -> bırar in Zaza, bera -> berar in Tati and bäre -> bärār in Semnani. Zaza, as with a number of other Iranian languages such as Talysh, Tati, central Iranian languages and dialects such as Semnani, Kahangi, Vafsi, Balochi and Kurmanji features split ergativity in its morphology, demonstrating ergative marking in past and perfective contexts, and nominative-accusative alignment otherwise. Syntactically it is nominative-accusative.

=== Grammatical gender ===
The grammatical gender forms of Old Iranian -except for the neuter form- remain largely the same in the Zaza language. The distinction between masculine and feminine forms is present in the entire morphology of the Zaza language, including nouns, adjectives, pronouns, cases and verb conjugations. In the Old Iranian era, the Old Iranian languages such as Avestan, Old Persian featured a grammatical gender system that included masculine, feminine, and neuter. And in Zaza, the feminine suffix of Old Iranian /-ā/ remained as the unstressed suffix /-e/ [-ə] in the northern dialect and as /-ı/ in the southern dialect of Zaza. Along with Zaza, the Semnani and Tati languages also exhibit the same feminine suffix form. For example, the word for donkey, her in Zaza and xar in Semnani and Tati:

- her (Zaza), xar (Semnani and Tati)
- her-e (Zaza) xár-a (Semnani and Tati)

While the words her and xár refer to jack or jackass, a male donkey in Zaza, Semnani and Tati; feminine forms of the words her and xar, respectively, the word with unstressed suffix /-e/, her-e in Zaza and xár-a in Semnani and Tati refer to a jenny or jennet, a female donkey. In Zaza and the closely related Tati and Semnani languages, the morphological expressions of grammatical gender across the direct and oblique cases, singular and plural numbers and the copula are as follows:

	masc dir sg	masc obl sg	fem dir sg	fem obl sg	masc/fem dir/obl pl	cop masc/fem
Zaza	-Ø	+ i	+ e	+ e	+ i / + un/ân	-o/-ā
Tati	-Ø	+ e	+ a	+ e	+ e / + on/ân	-e/-ā
Semnani	-Ø	+ i	+ ā	+ en	+ i / + un	-a/-e

	masc	fem
Zaza	subjmasc-Ø predmasc copula-o	subjfem-e predfem copula-ā
Tati	subjmasc-Ø predmasc copula-e	subjfem-a predfem copula-ā
Semnani	subjmasc-Ø predmasc copula-a	subjfem-ā predfem copula-e
Semnani (Note: Momenabadi)	subjmasc-Ø predmasc copula-a	subjfem-Ø predfem copula-ā
Sangsari	subjmasc-Ø predmasc copula-a	subjfem-Ø predfem copula-ö

Among all Western Iranian languages, Zaza, Semnani, Sangsari, the Tati dialects, Hazārrūdi, Cālī, Tākestāni, Kajali, Khalkhali, Karani, Lerdi, Diz, Sagzābādi, Eštehārdi, Ashtiani, Amorei, Alviri, Abyānei and central Iranian languages such as Jowšaqāni, Abuzeydābādi, Fārzāndī, Delījanī and Kurmanji distinguish between masculine and feminine grammatical gender. In Zaza, each noun belongs to one of those two genders. In order to correctly decline any noun and any modifier or other type of word affecting that noun, one must identify whether the noun is feminine or masculine. Most nouns have inherent gender. However, some nominal roots have variable gender, i.e. they may function as either masculine or feminine nouns. As a unique linguistic feature, among all Northwestern Iranian languages, only in the Zaza, Semnani, Sangsari and Tati languages, grammatical gender is marked on verbs. Furthermore, the copula in Zaza, Tati and Semnani manifests agreement in gender. And dissimilar to other Northwestern Iranian languages, Zaza and some Tati dialects do distinguish gender in second singular person too. In addition to copula, nouns, adjectives and verbs, in Zaza, Semnani and the Tati dialects grammatical gender is marked on demonstrative pronouns (for direct case) too. For instance:

	Zaza	Semnani	Tati (Note: Ashtiani)	Tati (Note: Eštehārdī)	Tati (Note: Kajali)	Tati (Note: Čālī)	Tati (Note: Alviri)	Sangsari
this (masc)	eno	en	eno	na	əm	ém	am	en
this (fem)	ena	ena	enona	nā	əma	éma	ama	na

=== Verbs ===
The Zaza verbal forms are based on three stems: subjunctive, present, and past. The subjunctive and past stems generally continue inherited Iranian present stems, while the present stems are derived from the Zaza subjunctive stems by the formant /-(e)n/

==== The passive and causative ====
Another feature of the Zaza language dating back to the Old and Middle Iranian era is that the passive stem (diathesis) is formed synthetic. The Old Indo-Iranian passive stem /-iiā/-/-i/ and its reflection in Pahlavi /-īh/ is still preserved in Zaza, Tati, Talysh, Semnani, Central and Judeo-Iranian dialects. The old passive stem appears as /-i/ in Zaza and the passive stem is derived by suffixing /-i/ to the verb stem. Similar to Zaza, in other members of the belt, in the Tati dialects (e.g. Eštehārdī, Ashtiani, Alviri, Čālī, Čarza etc.) and Talysh (e.g. Asālem) and Semnani (Note: Sangsari) the passive stem is formed by suffixing /-i/ to the verb stem and /-i, -y/ to the verb stem in the Central plateau languages and the Judeo-Iranian languages and /-ī/ to the verb stem in Eastern Balochi. Examples of passive voices are: nan weriyeno: bread (masc) is being eaten, şıt şımiyeno: milk (masc) is being drunk, nuşte nuşiyeno: the text (masc) is being written, keye viniyeno: the house (masc) is being seen. The causative stem is derived by /-n/ which derives from the causative suffix /-ēn/ of the Middle Iranian period. Examples of the causative voice are: veşneno: (he) burns, vurneno: (he) changes, musneno: (he) teaches. The causative stem /-n/ of Zaza appears as /-(e)n/ in Semnani, /-n/ in the Central plateau dialects, /-ni, -un/ in Talysh, /-en/ in Tati, /-en(d)/ in Mazanderani, /-an/ in Gilaki and /-ēn/ in Balochi.

=== Tenses ===
The infinitive ending is formed with /-ene/ in the north dialect and /-enı/ in the south dialect of the Zaza language.The basic stem of the verb is formed by deleting this ending. The present tense is formed by taking the present stem of the verb, adding the present participle ending and conjugating it. Zaza, Semnani, Talysh, Tati, Gilaki and Mazanderani derive their present stem from the same old Iranian present participle ending in /-ant/ Grammatical gender is marked on verbs, similar to Semnani and Tati/Azeri. For example, the present stem of the verbs şiyaene 'to go'" and vınderdene "to stop":

	1S	2S FEM	2S MASC	3S FEM	3S MASC
Zaza	ez şı-n-an	tı şı-n-ay	tı şı-n-ê	a şı-n-a	o şı-n-o
English	i go	you (FEM) go	you (MASC) go	she goes	he goes

	1S	2S FEM	2S MASC	3S FEM	3S MASC
Zaza	ez vınd-en-an	tı vınd-en-ay	tı vınd-en-ê	a vınd-en-a	o vınd-en-o
English	i stop	you (FEM) stop	you (MASC) stop	she stops	he stops

The present continuous is used in several instances. Its most common use is to describe something that is happening at the exact moment of speech. Present continuous can also describe an event planned in the future when combined with a time indicator for the future. Grammatical gender is marked on verbs, similar to Semnani, Sangsari, and Tati. The present continuous in Zaza is formed by conjugating the copula in accordance with the subject and conjugating the verb in accordance with the present tense:

	1S	2S fem	2S masc	3S fem	3S masc
Zaza	ez-o şı-n-a (ez-an şı-n-an)	tı-y-a şı-n-a(y)	tı-y-ê şı-n-ê	a-y-a şı-n-a	o-y-o şı-n-o
English	i am going	you (FEM) are going	you (MASC) are going	she is going	he is going

=== Number ===
==== Singular and plural ====
Nouns in Zaza, similar to Semnani, Tati and Talysh, distinguish number for direct and oblique cases. Nouns in Zaza are unmarked for the singular and marked with the unstressed /-i/ in the plural. For instance, kerg (hen) kergi (hens), verg (wolf) vergi (wolves), merdım (man) merdımi (men), vaş (grass) vaşi (grasses), estor (horse) estori (horses). Similar to Zaza, in Semnani, another member of the belt, nouns are marked with the plural suffix /-i/ in the direct plural. For instance, trees/horses = dari/estori in Zaza and dåri/asbi in Semnani. In addition to the common direct plural suffix /-i/ in two languages, both in Zaza and Semnani nouns are marked with the plural suffix /-un/ in the oblique plural. Similar oblique and direct plural forms are also found in Tati and Talysh. For instance:

	Zaza	Semnani	Tati	Talysh
pl dir	noun + i	noun + i	noun + ə	noun + e
pl obl	noun +un	noun +un	noun + ân	noun +ân

	snakes (dir pl)	snakes (obl pl)	goats (dir pl)	goats (obl pl)
Zaza	mor + i	mor + un	bız + i	bız + un
Semnani	mār + i	mār + un	boz + i	boz + un

==== Cardinal numbers ====
Among all Western Iranian languages, only in Zaza and closely related languages such as Semnani (and its dialects such as Sorkhei, Lasgerdi, Biyabunaki) and Tati (and its dialects such as Harzandi, Kilit) listed below, the number three is cognate with Parthian hry/hrē. Old Iranian /*θr/ further became /*hr/, in initial position acquired a supporting vowel here. In these languages, the v -> b and s -> h consonant change (vist and das in Zaza, Semnani, Tati, Parthian vs. bist and dah in Persian and Kurdish) is also clearly evident. As a rare linguistic feature, in Zaza, Semnani and Tati (Note: Tati dialects around Khalkhal County, e.g. Karan, Lerdi, Taromic dialects, Hazarrudi, Cali and many others) the number one, denoting the indefinite article, takes both masculine and feminine forms. In Avestan, which is an extinct Old Iranian language, numbers took gender specific forms. Cardinal numbers in Zaza and other closely related languages are as follows:

	one	two	three	four	five	six	seven	eight	nine	ten	twenty
Avestan	aēva/aēvā (masc/fem)	dva	hrī	čahwar	panca	hšvaš	hapta	ašta	nava	dasa	vīsati
Parthian	ēw	dō	hrē	čafār	panǰ	šwah	haft	hašt	nah	das	wist
Zaza	žew/žû (masc/fem)	di	hīrē	čahār	panǰ	šaš	hawt	hašt	naw	das	vist
Semnani	i/iya (masc/fem)	do	heyra	čār	panǰ	šaš	haft	hašt	na	das	vist
Semnani (Note: Sorkhei)	i	do	heré	čār	panǰ	šaš	haft	hašt	na	das	vist
Semnani (Note: Lasgerdi)	i	do	heyré	čār	panǰ	šaš	haft	hašt	na	das	vist
Semnani (Note: Biyabunaki)	i	dū	häirä	čāhār	pahānǰ	šāš	hāft	hāšt	nā	dās	vist
Tati	iv/iva (masc/fem)	de	here	čö	pinǰ	šoš	hoft	hašt	növ	doh	vist
Tati (Note: Harzandi)	i	de	heri	ču	pinǰ	šaš	hoft	hašt	nov	da	vist
Tati (Note: Kilit)	ivi	dèv	he	čoy	pinǰ	šaš	haft	hašt	nav	dah	vist

The cardinal numbers from ten to twenty and numbers in tens in Zaza exhibit strong similarities with Avestan, spoken in Central Asia, which, together with Old Persian, is one of two directly attested languages of the Old Iranian era and Parthian, spoken in Parthia and Khwarezmian, spoken in Central Asia, which are, respectively, two extinct Western and Eastern Iranian languages of the Middle Iranian era:

	eleven	twelve	thirteen	fourteen	fifteen	sixteen	seventeen	eighteen	nineteen
Zaza	žewendes	diwēs	hirēs	čahārēs	panǰēs	šiyēs	hawtēs	haštēs	nawēs
Parthian	ēwandas	dwaδes	hrēδas	čafārδas	panǰδas	šwahδas	haftād	haštād	nawad
Avestan	aēvandasa	dvadasa	hrīdasa	čahrudasa	pancadasa	hšwašdasa	haptadasa	aštadasa	navadasa
Khwarezmian	'ywnd's	'δw's	hrδ's	cwrδ's	pnṣ				nwδs

	ten	twenty	thirty	forty	fifty	sixty	seventy	eighty	ninety	hundred
Zaza	das	vist	hīris	čāwras	panǰās	šašti	hawtāy	haštāy	nawāy	sa
Parthian	das	wist	hrīst	čāfarast	panǰāst	šašt	?	?	?	sad
Avestan	dasa	vīsati	hrīsat	čahwarsat	pancasāt	hšvašti	haptaiti	aštaiti	navaiti	sata
Khwarezmian	δs	wsyc	šys	čf'rs	pnc's				nw'ys	s'd

=== Word derivation ===
The stressed suffix /-ıj/ added to nouns of place in Zaza denotes origin or relationship. Similar to Zaza, in the Tati and Talysh languages of the belt, suffix /-ij/ and /-ıj/, respectively, added to nouns to denote origin or relationship. This suffix is believed to be a relic of the Daylami language. The word "dehche" in the Daylami language had the meaning of peasant, someone from village, and the farmer. Its derivation was deh (village) + che (the suffix denoting origin or relationship). The suffix /-che/, is the same as the actual /-ij/ in the Caspian dialects. Here, /-ıj/ is a suffix for attributing to a place, such as Yoshij, someone from Yosh. For instance; Soyreg -> Soyreg-ıj- in Zaza, Lankon -> Lankon-ıj- in Talysh, Teron -> Teron-ij in Tati and Yosh -> Yosh-ij- in the Caspian dialects (someone from Soyreg, Lankon, Tehran and Yosh respectively) and dew -> dew-ıj- (village -> villager) in Zaza, di -> div-oj- (village -> villager) in Talysh.

	Zaza	Talysh	Tati	Caspian
place	Soyreg	Lankon	Teron	Yosh
from/of	Soyreg +ıj	Lankon +ıj	Teron +ij	Yosh +ij

The derivational suffix /-ki/ is used in Zaza to indicate languages or a quality and this suffix is attached to the end of the word, for instance Zazaki Zazaish, Almanki German and Ruski Russian. A similar suffix /-ig/, /-yk/, referring to the language, P'hlwbyk used for the Parthian language. Another suffix, the suffix /-iš/ forms verbal nouns in Zaza, by adding it to the preterite stem and verbal nouns derived from this suffix have masculine gender. In Parthian and Middle Persian, a similar suffix, /-išn/ has existed. Along with Zaza, the same suffix has been preserved in Modern Persian too. For instance:

	doing	making	counting	praying	bearing	eating
Zaza	kerd-iš	virast-iš	amord-iš	wend-iš	berd-iš	werd-iš
Parthian	kar-išn	wirašt-išn	amward-išn	wend-išn	?	
Middle Persian	kun-išn	wirāy-išn	amar-išn	wend-išn	bar-išn	xwar-išn
Modern Persian	kon-eš	saz-eš	šomar-eš	xān-eš	bar-eš	xor-eš

=== Personal pronouns ===
As a rare linguistic feature for Iranian languages, Zaza distinguishes between masculine and feminine in the third person singular for both the direct and oblique case. The masculine third person pronoun is o, the feminine one is a. Similar to Zaza, among all Western Iranian languages, Zaza, Semnani, Sangsari, Tati dialects, Hazārrūdi, Cālī, Tākestāni, Kajali, Khalkhali, Karani, Lerdi, Diz, Sagzābādi, Eštehārdi, Ashtiani, Amorei, Alviri, Abyānei, Jowšaqāni, Abuzeydābādi, Farizandi languages distinguish between masculine and feminine for the third person pronoun. Similar to other languages with the T–V distinction, Zaza has a distinction in its second person pronouns too. In Zaza, the second person plural pronoun, şıma, is used to address someone in a more polite way, instead of the direct and oblique second person singulars tı and to, similar to the use of to and şomâ in Persian.

English	Zaza	Tati (Note: Hazārrūdi)	Tati (Note: Amorei)	Tati (Note: Alviri-Vidari dialect)	Tati (Note: Eštehārdi)	Tati (Note: Cālī)	Tati (Note: Khalkhali)	Ashtiani	Tati (Note: Tākestāni)	Semnani	Sangsari	Abyanei	Talysh	Ossetian
i	ez	az	az	az	az	az	az	az	a(z)	a	a	az	əz	əz
you	tı	ta	tö	ta	tö	ta	tə	ta	ta	tö	tö	tö	tı	dɨ
he	o	o	o	u	a	a	av	ān	āv	u	nö	nūn	əv/ay	wɨj
she	a	oa	ona	ua	ā	aya	ava	āna	āvā	una	nā	nūnā	əv/ay	wɨj
we	mā	amā	hāmā	ǰema	čama	amā	âmâ	īma	āmā	hamā	ham	hāmā	ama	maχ
you	šımā	šomā	šomā	šemā	šəma	šömā	šâmâ	īšma	šomā	šemā	xā	šömā	šımə	sɨmaχ
they	ê/inā	o	(en)ogal	unehā	āhā	ay	avə	āngal	ānā	uni	anun	nūmā	əvon/ayēn	wɨdon

== Phonology ==
=== Vowels and consonants ===
The vowel /e/ may also be realized as [ɛ] when occurring before a consonant. /ɨ/ may become lowered to [ɪ] when occurring before a velarized nasal /n/ [ŋ], or occurring between a palatal approximant /j/ and a palato-alveolar fricative /ʃ/. Vowels /ɑ/, /ɨ/, or /ə/ become nasalized when occurring before /n/, as [ɑ̃], [ɨ̃], and [ə̃], respectively.

	Front	Central	Back
Close	i	ɨ	u
Close	i	ɨ	ʊ
Mid	e	ə	o
Open		ɑ	

/n/ becomes a velar [ŋ] when following a velar consonant.

		Labial	Dental/ Alveolar		Palato- alveolar	Palatal	Velar	Uvular	Pharyngeal	Glottal
		Labial	plain	phar.	Palato- alveolar	Palatal	Velar	Uvular	Pharyngeal	Glottal
Nasal		m	n				(ŋ)			
Plosive/ Affricate	voiceless	p	t	tˁ	t͡ʃ		k	q		
Plosive/ Affricate	voiced	b	d		d͡ʒ		ɡ			
Fricative	voiceless	f	s	sˤ	ʃ		x		ħ	h
Fricative	voiced	v	z		ʒ		ɣ		ʕ	
Rhotic	tap/flap		ɾ							
Rhotic	trill		r							
Lateral	central		l							
Lateral	velarized		ɫ							
Approximant		w				j				

=== Historical phonology ===
Karl Hadank, in his prominent work on the Zaza language, Mundarten der Zâzâ (1932), provided a detailed analysis of the phonological changes in Zaza and he demonstrated that, as a language in its own right, Zaza has a unique phonological development. From a historical linguistics perspective, Zaza has very strongly preserved the sound changes belonging to the Northwestern Iranian group and thus it is quite distant from Persian and Kurdish. The distinctive (diachronic) phonological changes of the Western Iranian languages in terms of their historical evolution are as follows:

v -> b
	wind	snow	willow	twenty	see
Zaza	va	vore	viale	vist	vin
Semnani	va	vara	via	vist	
Sangsari	ve	varf	vi	vist	vin
Talysh	vā	vār	vi	vist	vin
Tati	vör	vohor	via	vist	vin
Gilaki	vā	varf	vi		
Mazanderani	vo(t)	varf			vīn
Persian	bād	barf	bid	bist	bin
Kurdish	ba	berf	bi	bist	bin

v -> g
	wolf	flower	grass
Zaza	verg	vıle	vaš
Semnani	verg	vala	vāš
Sangsari	varg	vala	
Talysh	varg	vıl	vāš
Tati	vorg	vile	vaš
Gilaki	verg		vāš
Mazandarani	varg	vel	vaš
Persian	gorg	gol	geyā
Kurdish	gur	gul	giya

m -> v
	eye	name	winter	guest
Zaza	čım	name	zımıstān	meymān
Semnani		nom	zemeston	memon
Sangsari	čašm	noum	zemestun	memoun
Talysh	čam	nom	zımıston	meymun
Tati	čam	nom	zimeston	memon
Gilaki	čūm	nūm	zemestūn	meymūn
Mazandarani		nom	zemestūn	memān
Persian	češm	nām	zemestān	mehmān
Kurdish	çav	nav	zivistan	mivan

h/x -> k
	donkey
Zaza	har
Semnani	xar
Sangsari	xar
Talysh	har
Tati	har
Gilaki	xar
Mazandarani	xar
Persian	xar
Kurdish	kar

r -> l
	year
Zaza	sēri
Semnani	
Sangsari	
Talysh	sār
Tati	sār
Gilaki	sāl
Mazandarani	sāl
Persian	sāl
Kurdish	sāl

b -> d
	door
Zaza	bar
Semnani	bar
Sangsari	bar
Talysh	bar
Tati	bar
Gilaki	bar
Mazandarani	bar
Persian	dar
Kurdish	dari

b -> g
	cry
Zaza	barm
Semnani	barm
Sangsari	burme
Talysh	bāme
Tati	berām
Gilaki	barmā
Mazandarani	barm
Persian	gerya
Kurdish	girin

== Writing systems ==
=== The Arabic-based Zaza alphabet ===
Zaza texts written during the Ottoman era were written in Arabic letters. The works of this era had religious content. The first Zaza text, written by Sultan Efendi, in 1798, was written in Arabic letters in the Nesih font, which was also used in Ottoman Turkish. Following this work, the first Zaza language Mawlid, written by the Ottoman-Zaza cleric, writer and poet Ahmed el-Hassi in 1891–1892, was also written in Arabic letters and published in 1899. Another Mawlid in the Zaza language, written by another Ottoman-Zaza cleric Osman Esad Efendi between 1903 and 1906, was also written in Arabic letters. The Arabic letters used for Zaza were also used by Karl Hadank for Zaza, in his prominent linguistic work on Zaza, "Mundarten der Zâzâ". The Zaza alphabet based on Arabic letters was similar to the Ottoman Turkish and Persian alphabets and included the letters پ چ ژ in addition to the standard Arabic letters. Even after the alphabet reform in Turkey, some Zaza writers continued to write using the Arabic alphabet. The Arabic-based Zaza alphabet included the following letters:

The Arabic-based Zaza alphabet
Letter	آ	ـَ	إ	ـِ	ـُ	ب	پ	ت	ث	ج	چ	ح	خ	د	ذ	ر	ز	ژ	س	ش	ص	ض	ط	ظ	ع	غ	ف	ق	ڨ	ک	ل	م	ن	و	ی	ه
IPA	ɑ	æ	e	ɪ	u	b	p	t	s	d͡ʒ	tʃ	h	x	d	z	ɾ	z	ʒ	s	ʃ	s	z	d	z	ʔ	γ	f	q	v	k	l	m	n	n	j	h

=== Latin alphabet ===
After the Republic, Zaza works began to be written in Latin letters, largely abandoning the Arabic-based Zaza alphabet. However, today Zaza does not have a common alphabet used by all Zazas. An alphabet called the Jacabson alphabet was developed with the contributions of the American linguist C. M Jacobson and is used by the Zaza Language Institute in Frankfurt, which works on the standardization of the Zaza language. Another alphabet used for the language is the Bedirxan alphabet. Another Zaza alphabet, prepared by Zülfü Selcan and started to be used at Munzur University as of 2012, is another writing system developed for Zaza, consisting of 32 letters, 8 of which are vowels and 24 of which are consonants. The Zaza alphabet is an extension of the Latin alphabet used for writing the Zaza language, consisting of 32 letters, six of which (ç, ğ, î, û, ş, and ê) have been modified from their Latin originals for the phonetic requirements of the language.

Zaza alphabet
Upper case	A	B	C	Ç	D	E	Ê	F	G	Ẍ / Ğ	H	I / I	Î / İ	J	K	L	M	N	O	P	Q	R	S	Ş	T	U	Û	V	W	X	Y	Z
Lower case	a	b	c	ç	d	e	ê	f	g	ẍ / ğ	h	i / ı	î / i	j	k	l	m	n	o	p	q	r	s	ş	t	u	û	v	w	x	y	z
IPA phonemes	a	b	d͡ʒ	t͡ʃ	d	ɛ	e	f	g	ɣ	h	ɪ	i	ʒ	k	l	m	n	o	p	q	r, ɾ	s	ʃ	t	ʊ	u	v	w	x	j	z

== Literature ==
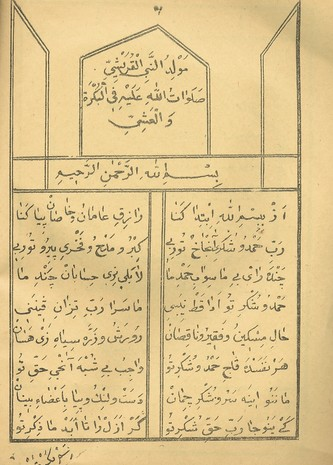
Zaza text in Arabic letters, written in 1891 and printed in 1899

Zaza literature consists of oral and written texts produced in the Zaza language. Before it began to be written, it was passed on through oral literature types. In this respect, Zaza literature is very rich in terms of oral works. The language has many oral literary products such as deyr (folk song), kilam (song), dêse (hymn), şanıke (fable), hêkati (story), qesê werênan (proverbs and idioms). Written works began to appear during the Ottoman Empire, and the early works had a religious/doctrinal nature. After the Republic, long-term language and cultural bans caused the revival of Zaza literature, which developed in two centers, Turkey and Europe, primarily in Europe. After the loosened bans, Zaza literature developed in Turkey.

=== Ottoman period ===
The first known written works of Zaza literature were written during the Ottoman period. Written works in the Zaza language produced during the Ottoman period were written in Arabic letters and had a religious nature. The first written work in Zaza during this period was written in the late 1700s. This first written text of the Zaza language was written by İsa Beg bin Ali, nicknamed Sultan Efendi, an Islamic history writer, in 1212 Hijri (1798). The work was written in Arabic letters and in the Naskh script, which is also used in Ottoman Turkish. The work consists of two parts III. It includes the Eastern Anatolia region during the reign of Selim III, the life of Ali (caliph), Alevi doctrine and history, the translation of some parts of Nahj al-balagha into the Zaza language, apocalyptic subjects and poetic texts. About a hundred years after this work, another work in the Zaza language, Mevlit (Mewlid-i Nebi), was written by the Ottoman-Zaza cleric, writer and poet Ahmed el-Hassi (1867–1951) in 1891–1892. The first Mevlit (Mawlid) work in the Zaza language was written in Arabic letters and published in 1899. The mawlid, written using the Arabic prosody (aruz), resembles the mawlid of Süleyman Çelebi and the introduction includes the life of the Islamic prophet Muhammad and the details of Allah, tawhid, munacaat, ascension, birth, birth and creation, etc. It includes religious topics and consists of 14 chapters and 366 couplets. Another written work written during this period is another Mevlit written by Siverek mufti Osman Esad Efendi (1852–1929). The work called Biyişa Pexemberi (Birth of the Prophet) consists of chapters on the Islamic prophet Muhammad and the Islamic religion and was written in the Zaza language in Arabic letters in 1901 (1903 according to some sources). The work was published in 1933, after the author's death. Apart from Zaza writers, non-Zaza/Ottoman writers/researchers such as Peter Ivanovich Lerch (1827–1884), Robert Gordon Latham (1812–1888) Dr. Humphry Sandwith (1822–1881), Wilhelm Strecker (1830–1890), Otto Blau (1828–1879), Friedrich Müller (1864) and Oskar Mann (1867–1917) included Zaza content (story, fairy tales dictionary) in their works in the pre-Republican period.

=== Post-Republic Zaza literature ===
Post-Republican Zaza literature developed through two branches, Turkey-centered and Europe-centered. During this period, the development of Zaza literature stagnated in Turkey due to long-term language and cultural bans. Zaza migration to European countries in the 1980s and the relatively free environment enabled the revival of Zaza literature in Europe. One of the works in the Zaza language written in post-Republican Turkey are two verse works written in the field of belief and fiqh in the 1940s. Following this work, another Mevlit containing religious subjects and stories was written by Mehamed Eli Hun in 1971. Another literary work from this period is Zaza Divan, a 300-page manuscript in the divan genre consisting of Zaza poems and odes, writing was started by Mehmet Demirbaş in 1975 and completed in 2005. Amongst other literary works with religious content are the Mevlits and sirahs of Abdulkadir Arslan (1992–1995), Kamil Pueği (1999), Muhammed Muradan (1999–2000) and Cuma Özusan (2009). Written Zaza literature is rich in Mawlid and religious works, and the first written works of the language are in these genres.

The development of Zaza literature through magazines took place after 1980 when Zazas who immigrated to Europe took to publishing magazines in the Zaza language, as well as multilingual magazines and publications not predominantly in the Zaza language but including Zaza works. Notable magazines originating in this period include Kormışkan, Tija Sodıri, Vate which were published solely in the Zaza language. Ebubekir Pamukçu, a leading name of Zaza nationalism, published the cultural magazines Ayre (1985–1987), Piya (1988–1992) and Raa Zazaistani (1991). Zaza emigrants in Europe have since founded Zaza-based multilingual magazines such as Ware, ZazaPress, Pir, Raştiye, Vengê Zazaistani, Zazaki, Zerq, Desmala Sure, Waxt, Çıme and Ma'z Êst. In addition to these, Vatı (1997–1998), was the first magazine published entirely in the Zaza language to be published in Turkey, followed by Miraz (2006) and Veng u Vaj (2008). Magazines that are predominantly published in another language but also include works in the Zaza language are mainly those published in both Kurdish and Turkish languages. Among them are Roja Newé (1963), Riya Azadi (1976), Tirêj (1979) and War (1997); followed by Ermin (1991), Ateş Hırsızı (1992), Ütopya, Işkın, Munzur (2000) and Bezuvar (2009). In addition to these, Vatı (1997–1998), was the first magazine published entirely in the Zaza language to be published in Turkey, followed by Miraz (2006) and Veng u Vaj (2008). Magazines that are mainly published in another language but also include works in the Zaza language are mainly those published in both Kurdish and Turkish languages. Among them are Roja Newé (1963), Riya Azadi (1976), Tirêj (1979) and War (1997); followed by Ermin (1991), Ateş Hırsızı (1992), Ütopya, Işkın, Munzur (2000) and Bezuvar (2009). Today, works in different literary genres such as poetry, stories and novels in the Zaza language are published by different publishing houses in Turkey and European countries.

== Gallery ==
Partial tree of the Indo-European languages.

Gippert, Jost (1999), Iranische Sprachen / Iranian Languages

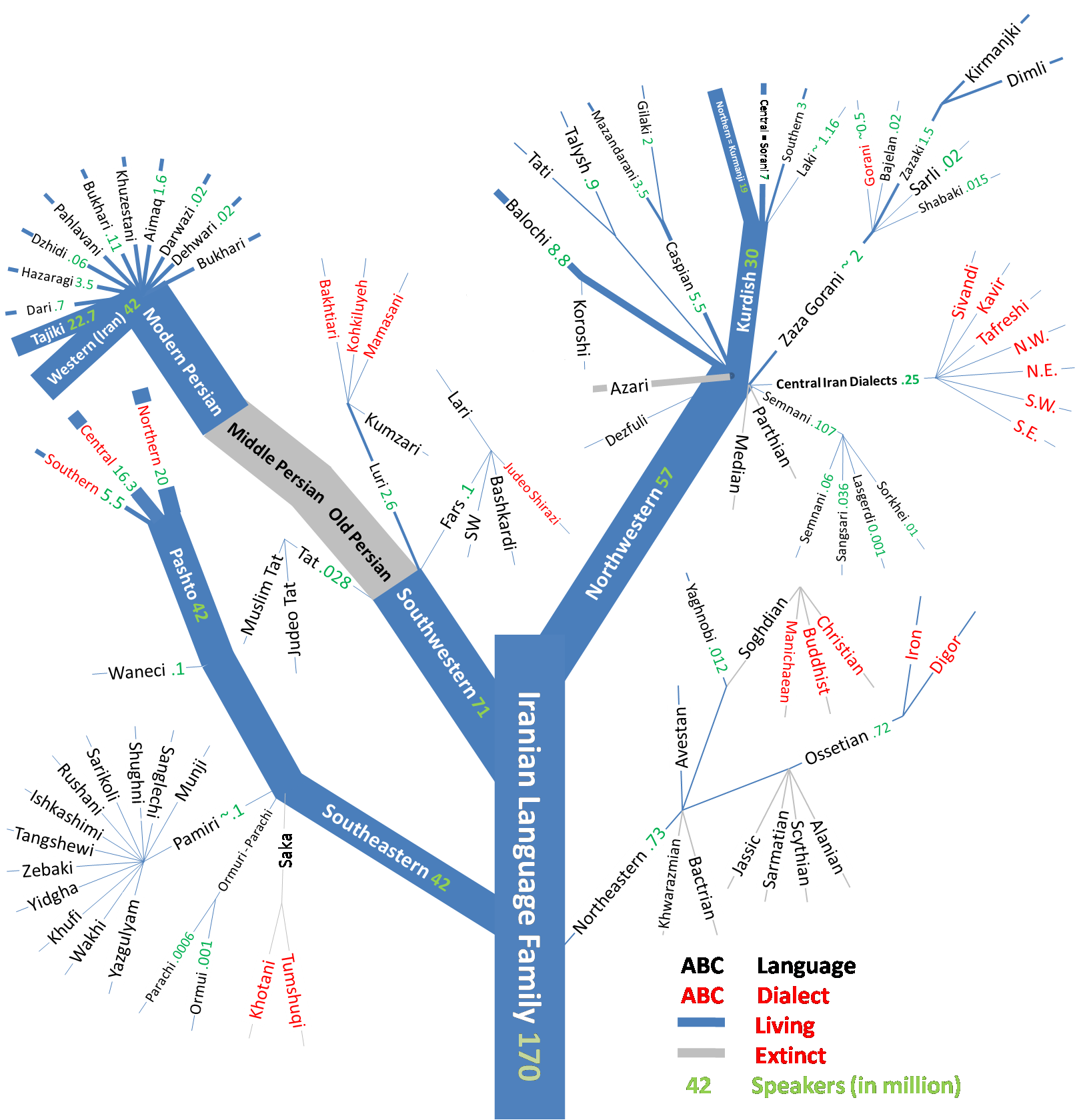
The position of the Zaza language among the Iranian Languages

== See also ==
- Zazas
- Zaza nationalism

== Bibliography ==
- Asatrian, Garnik (1995), "DIMLĪ", Encyclopædia Iranica, VI (5): 405–411
- Hadank, Karl (1932). Mundarten der Zâzâ: Hauptsächlich aus Siwerek und Kor. Berlin: Verlag der Preussischen Akademie.
- Arslan, İlyas (2016). Verbfunktionalität und Ergativität in der Zaza-Sprache [Verb functionality and ergativity in the Zaza language] (PDF) (PhD thesis). Universität Düsseldorf. Archived from the original (PDF) on 23 December 2016.
- Selcan, Zülfü (1998). Grammatik der Zaza-Sprache Nord-Dialekt (Dersim-Dialekt) [Grammar of the Zaza language, Northern dialect (Dersim dialect)] (in German). Berlin: Wissenschaft & Technik Verlag. ISBN 3-928943-96-0.
- Selcan, Zülfü (2011). "Zaza Dilinin Tarihi Gelişimi" [Historical Development of Zaza Language] (PDF). I. Uluslararası Zaza Dili Sempozyumu.
- Varol, Murat (2011). I. Uluslararası Zaza Dili Sempozyumu [1st International Zaza Language Symposium]. Ankara: Bingöl Üniversitesi Yayınları.
- Paul, Ludwig (2009). "Zazaki". In Windfuhr, Gernot (ed.). The Iranian Languages. New York: Routledge. pp. 545–586. ISBN 978-0-7007-1131-4.
- Windfuhr, Gernot L. (1991), "CENTRAL DIALECTS", Encyclopædia Iranica, V (3): 3242–252
- Windfuhr, Gernot L. (1995), "DIALECTOLOGY", Encyclopædia Iranica, VII (4): 362–370
- Henning, Walter Bruno (1954). "THE ANCIENT LANGUAGE OF AZEEBAIJAN". Transactions of the Philological Society. 53 (1): 157–177. doi:10.1111/j.1467-968X.1954.tb00282.x.
- Blau, Joyce (1989). "Gurânî et Zâzâ". In Schmitt, Rüdiger (ed.). Compendium Linguarum Iranicarum. Wiesbaden: Reichert. pp. 336–340. ISBN 3-88226-413-6. (About Daylamite origin of Zaza-Guranis)
- Gajewski, Jon. (2004) "Zazaki Notes" Massachusetts Institute of Technology.
- Gippert, Jost (4 May 1996). Die historische Entwicklung der Zaza-Sprache (PDF) (Speech). Mannheim Zaza Book Festival (in German). University of Frankfurt. (not original published speech)
- Gippert, Jost (4 May 1996). Zazaca'nın tarihsel gelişimi (PDF) (Speech). Mannheim Zaza Book Festival (in Turkish). Translated by Dursun, Hasan. University of Frankfurt. Archived from the original (PDF) on 21 June 2006.
- Skjaervo, Prods Oktor (2009). "Middle West Iranian". In Windfuhr, Gernot (ed.). The Iranian Languages. New York: Routledge. ISBN 978-0-7007-1131-4.
- Yarshater, Ehsan (1960). "The Tāti Dialect of Kajal". Bulletin of the School of Oriental and African Studies. 23 (2): 275–286. doi:10.1017/S0041977X00149948.
- *Borjian, Habib (2026), "How Many Languages Are spoken in Semnan Area?: Typology and Origins of Komisenian Languages", in Korangy, Alireza; Khoshsirat, Zia (eds.), Caspian Languages and Linguistics: Eight Essays, Singapore: Springer Singapore, pp. 15–38
- Arakelova, Victoria (1999). "The Zaza People as a New Ethno-Political Factor in the Region". Iran & the Caucasus. 3/4: 397–408. doi:10.1163/157338499X00335. JSTOR 4030804.
- Haig, Geoffrey; Öpengin, Ergin. "Introduction to Special Issue - Kurdish: A critical research overview" (PDF). Kurdish Studies. 2 (2). Archived from the original (PDF) on 22 October 2014.
- Keskin, Mesut (2008). Zur dialektalen Gliederung des Zazaki (Thesis). Frankfurt am Main: Goethe-Universität.
- Keskin, Mesut (2015). "Zaza Dili (Zaza Language)". Bingöl Üniversitesi Yaşayan Diller Enstitüsü Dergisi. 1 (1): 93–114.
- Larson, Richard K.; Yamakido, Hiroko (8 January 2006). Zazaki "Double Ezafe" as Double Case-Marking (PDF). LSA. Albuquerque, NM. Archived from the original (PDF) on 3 September 2006.
- Windfuhr, Gernot (2009). The Iranian Languages. New York: Routledge. ISBN 978-0-7007-1 131-4.
- Hassanzadeh-Nodehi, Ramin (2025). Towards a grammar of the Semnāni language (PDF) (PhD thesis). Rome: Sapienza – Università di Roma.
- سبزعلیپور, جهاندوست (2013). "تمایز جنس مونث و مذکر در گویش تاتی خلخال" [Distiniction of the Feminine and Masculine Gender in the Tāti Dialect of Khalkhāl]. نامه فرهنگستان (in Persian). 13 (1): 66–89.
- Пахалина, Т. Н. (1999). "Языки мира: Иранские языки. II. Северо-западные иранские языки" (PDF). Министерство науки и высшего образования Ро. РОССИЙСКАЯ АКАДЕМИЯ НАУК.
- Lecoq, Pierre (1989), "Les Dialectes Caspiens Et Les Dialectes Du Nord-ouest De L'iran", in Schmitt, Rüdiger (ed.), Compendium Linguarum Iranicarum (in French), Wiesbaden: Dr. Ludwig Reichert Verlag, ISBN 3-88226-413-6
- Malmîsanij, Mehemed (2021). "The Kirmanjki (Zazaki) Dialect of Kurdish Language and the Issues it Faces". In Bozarslan, Hamit; Gunes, Cengiz; Yadirgi, Veli (eds.). The Cambridge History of the Kurds. Cambridge: Cambridge University Press. pp. 663–684. doi:10.1017/9781108623711.027. ISBN 978-1-108-62371-1. S2CID 235541104.
- Paul, Ludwig (1998). "The Position of Zazaki Among West Iranian languages" (PDF). In Sims-Williams, Nicholas (ed.). Proceedings of the Third European Conference of Iranian Studies held in Cambridge, 11th to 15th September 1995. Vol. I: Old and Middle Iranian Studies. Wiesbaden: Ludwig Reichert. pp. 163–177.
- Werner, Brigitte (2007). Features of Bilingualism in the Zaza Community (PDF) (Report). Archived from the original (PDF) on 29 December 2009.
- Todd, Terry Lynn (2002), A grammar of Dimili also known as Zaza, Stockholm: Iremet Förlag
- Hayıg, Roşan; Werner, Brigitte (2012), Zazaca-Türkçe Sözlük ; Türkçe-Zazaca Sözcük Listesi (Çermik – Çüngüş – Siverek – Gerger Bölgeleri) [Zaza-Turkish Dictionary; Turkish-Zaza Word List (Çermik - Çüngüş - Siverek - Gerger Regions)], Istanbul: Tij Yayınları
- Arslan, İlyas (2018), "Zaza Dilinde Lehçe Farklılıkları" [The Dialectological Differences Of Zaza Language], Bingöl Üniversitesi Yaşayan Diller Enstitüsü Dergisi, 4 (4): 51–66 – via Bingöl Üniversitesi Yaşayan Diller Enstitüsü
