= Mehemed Malmîsanij =

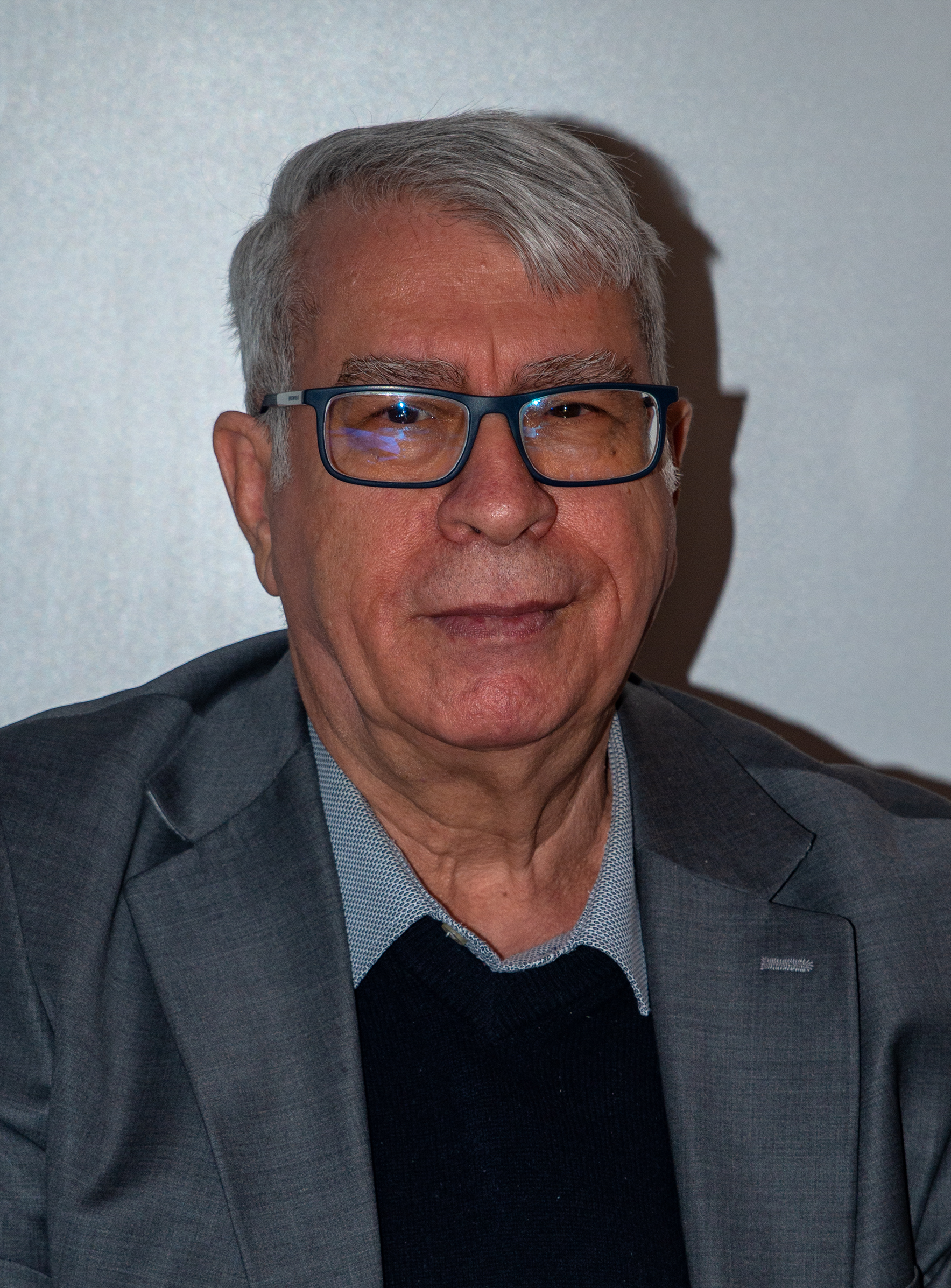
Image of Malmîsanij

Mehmet Tayfun alias Malmîsanij (born 1952 in Diyarbakır) is a Kurdish author and linguist. He mostly writes in Zazaki. He often writes under the pseudonym Malmîsanij.

He studied at the University of Ankara, and was under arrest three times between 1975 and 1981 because of his political activities. In 1982, he moved to Sweden. He continued his studies in Europe. He studied Iranian studies at the Sorbonne University, Iranian languages at the University of Uppsala and folk education at the University of Linköping. He has a master's degree from the University of Gothenburg.

After Ehmedê Xasî and Osman Efendîyo Babij who wrote the first works in Zazaki, in the late 19th and early 20th century, nobody wrote in Zazaki until 1970. Malmîsanij is the first author who started modern Zazaki literature in the 1970s. He published the first Zazaki dictionary in 1987. He and his friends published a magazine, named "Tîrêj", in the 1970s. This magazine was half Zazaki and half Kurmanji. He has written for several publications, including "Hêvî", "Armanc", "Çar çira", "Çira", "Wan", and "Vate". Some of his works have been translated into English, Arabic, French and Swedish.

He is a part of the "Grûba Xebate Ya Vateyî", a group working on unifying the Zazaki language. He also takes part in the standardization of Kurmanji Kurdish.

== Works ==
- Yüzyılımızın Başlarında Kürt Milliyetçiliği ve Dr. Abdullah Cevdet, Uppsala, 1986
- Ferhengê Dimilkî-Tirkî, Uppsala, 1987; Istanbul, 1992 (Zazaki)
- Herakleîtos, Uppsala, 1988, (Zazaki)
- Li Kurdistana Bakur û Li Tirkiyê Rojnamegeriya Kurdî (1908-1992), Ankara, 1992 (Malmîsanij & Mahmûd Lewendî)
- Folklorê Ma ra Çend Numûney, Uppsala, 1991; Istanbul, 2000 (Zazaki)
- Said-i Nursi ve Kürt Sorunu, Stockholm, 1991; Istanbul, 1991
- Abdurrahman Bedirhan Ve İlk Kürt Gazetesi Kürdistan sayı: 17 ve 18, Stockholm, 1992
- Bitlisli Kemal Fevzi ve Kürt Örgütleri İçindeki Yeri, Stockholm, 1993; Istanbul, 1993
- Cızira Botanlı Bedirhaniler ve Bedirhani Ailesi Derneği’nin Tutanakları, Stockholm, 1994; Istanbul, 2000
- Kırd, Kırmanc, Dımıli veya Zaza Kürtleri, Istanbul, 1996
- Ferhengekê Kirdkî-Pehlevkî-Kurmanckî, Stockholm, 1997 (Zazaki)
- Kürt Teavün ve Terakki Cemiyeti ve Gazetesi, Stockholm, 1998; Istanbul, 1999
- Kurdiskt författarskap och kurdisk bokutgivning: bakgrund, villkor, betydelse, Stockholm, 1998
- Ji Bo Rastnivîsînê Ferhenga Kurdî (Kurmancî) - Tirkî (2012)
- Kurmancca ile Karşılaştırmalı Kırmancca (Zazaca) Dilbilgisi, Vate, Istanbul 2015. (Zazaki & Kurmanci & Turkish)
- Ji Bo Rastnivîsînê Ferhenga Kurdî (Kurmancî) - Tirkî ya Nû (2018)
