= Southern Zaza =

Dialect of Zaza

- Dımli, Dımıli, Dımılki
- Pronunciation: Zaza pronunciation: [dɪmɪlki]
- Native to: Turkey
- Region: Siverek, Gerger, Çüngüş, Çermik, Hilvan and more places in eastern and southeastern anatolia.
- Ethnicity: Zazas
- Native speakers: 1.16 million (2016)
- Language family: Indo-European: Indo-Iranian; Iranian; Western; Northwestern; Adharic; Zaza; Southern Zaza
- Dialects: Sivereki; Kori; Motki; Dumbuli; Hazzu
- Writing system: Latin script

Language codes
- ISO 639-2: diq
- ISO 639-3: diq
- Glottolog: diml1238 Dimli
- ELP: Dimli
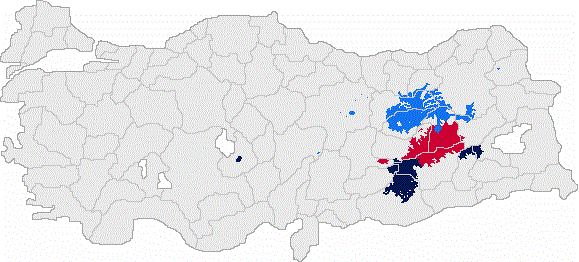
- Southern Zaza, shaded in dark blue.

Southern Zaza, is one of the three primary dialects of the Zaza language, spoken by the Zaza people. The dialect is also referred to as Dımli, Dımıli or Dımılki, which are believed to be historically and linguistically derived from the words Daylam and Daylamite.

== Classification ==
Glottolog classifies Southern Zaza within the Adharic subgroup of the Northwestern Iranian languages branch of the Iranian languages. Southern Zaza consists of five sub-dialects, Dumbuli, Hazzu, Kori, Motki and Sivereki:

- Northwestern Iranian
  - Adharic
    - Adhari (Old Azeri)
    - Zaza (Zaza)
      - Southern Zaza
      - Northern Zaza
    - Tatic (Tati-Talysh)
    - Gurani

== History ==
Southern Zaza, its Siverek, Kori and nearby dialects, was analyzed linguistically by linguists Oskar Mann and Karl Hadank in the early 20th century. The first religious poems (Mawluds) written in the Zaza language during the late 19th and early 20th centuries were composed in this dialect, utilizing the Arabic letters.

== Speakers ==
Southern Zaza is spoken predominantly in Siverek, Çermik, Çüngüş, Gerger, Mutki, Aksaray, Ergani, Maden and Kulp. Speakers of the Southern Zaza adhere to the doctrines of the Hanafi school of Islamic jurisprudence, similar to the Turks and Arabs in the areas where they live, but unlike the Kurds. The number of Southern Zaza speakers was estimated to be around 1.1 million people in 2016.

== Grammar ==
Southern Zaza has a more conservative (archaic) structure than other dialects of the Zaza language. The dialect differs from Northern Zaza in phonological, morphological, syntactic, and lexical aspects. The least difference is found in syntax, while the most significant differences are found in phonology. The phonological changes between š and s, g and c and k and č are noteworthy. Morphologically, the feminine suffix is realized as an unstressed /-ı/ in Southern Zaza, whereas it is realized as /-e/ in Northern Zaza. A distinctive linguistic feature of Southern Zaza, setting it apart from all other Iranian languages, is its employment of a double ezafe system.

The following table provides a comparative overview of the phonological changes between Southern and Northern Zaza:

English	Southern Zaza	Northern Zaza
milk	šıt	sıt
hungry/thirsty	veyšan/teyšan	vesan/tesan
house	ke, keye, kiye	če, čeye
soul	gan	can
chicken	kergı	kerge

== Bibliography ==
- Werner, Eberhard (2017). Rivers and Mountains: A Historical, Applied Anthropological and Linguistical Study of the Zaza People of Turkey Including an Introduction to Applied Cultural Anthropology. Nuremberg: Verlag Fur Theologie Und Religionswissenschaft. ISBN 978-3957760654.
- Arakelova, Victoria (1999), "The Zaza People as a New Ethno-Political Factor in the Region", Iran & the Caucasus, 3/4: 397–408, doi:10.1163/157338499X00335, ISSN 1573-384X, JSTOR 4030804
