= Azari language =

Azari language may refer to:

- Azerbaijani language, a modern language spoken in Azerbaijan and Northwest Iran, from Turkic language family
- Old Azeri, an old language from Iranian language family
