= ZZA =

ZZA may refer to:

- The ISO 639-2 language code for the Zaza language
- The General Catalogue of Variable Stars code for a type of pulsating white dwarf
