= Harzandi dialect =

Dialect of the Tati language

Harzani
- Harzandi
- Native to: Iran
- Native speakers: 36,000 (2021)
- Language family: Indo-European: Indo-Iranian; Iranian; Western Iranian; Northwestern Iranian; Adharic; Tatic; Northern Tatic; Harzandi-Kilit; Harzani
- Dialects: Harzandi

Language codes
- ISO 639-3: hrz
- Glottolog: harz1239
- ELP: Harzani

Harzandi or Harzani (Tati: هرزندی، هرزنی) is a dialect of the Tati language, spoken in the northern regions of the East Azarbaijan province of Iran. It is strictly an oral language, and a descendant of the Old Azeri language that has long been extinct as a result of the diffusion of Turkish in the area. Harzandi has many common linguistic features with both Talysh and Zaza and was positioned between the Talysh and Zaza.

Harzani Tati is considered an endangered language with a little less than 30,000 speakers in present day. Its speakers principally reside in the rural district of Harzand, particularly in the village known as Galin Qayah. Harzani is also present in the neighboring villages of Babratein and Dash Harzand. As of now, Harzani has not been formally recognized by the Islamic Republic of Iran, and thus receives no government support.

== Classification ==
Harzandi is a Tati dialect belonging to the Northwestern Iranian languages and closely related to Kilit, Talysh and Zaza. It shares many characteristics and common words and linguistic affinity with Zaza and considered a transitional dialect between Tati/Talysh and Zaza.

== Grammar ==
Similar to other languages and dialects of the Iranian language family, Harzani follows a subject–object–verb (SOV) word order. It has nine vowels, and shares a consonant inventory with Persian. It further exhibits a split-ergative case system: its present tense is structured to follow nominative-accusative patterning, while its past tense follows ergative-absolutive.

One characteristic that distinguishes Harzani from related Northwestern Iranian languages is its change from an intervocalic /d/ to an /r/. It also has a tendency to lengthen its vowels. For instance, it has the closed vowel /oe/.

=== Nouns and pronouns ===
Nouns and pronouns in Harzani do not reflect grammatical gender, but they do express case. Nouns, in particular, encode two cases: direct and oblique case, the first of which is not rendered morphologically, but the second is by attaching a suffix. Meanwhile, personal pronouns have three cases: direct, oblique, and possessive.

Harzandi, similar to closely related Zaza, Karingani and Sangsari, lacks possessive enclitics. Harzandi pronouns are i: man, you: te, he: a, she: a, we: âmâ, you: šemā, they: âvoy.

=== Verbs ===
Verbs in Harzani are inflected for present tense and past tense. Information concerning person and number is reflected in suffixes that attach to these two verb stems. Modal and aspectual information is expressed using prefixes. Harzandi, similar to closely related Zaza, derives its present stem from the old Iranian present participle /*-ant/.

=== Numeral system ===
Part of Harzani's census system is given in the table below. In addition to its decimal system, Harzandi has an alternative vigesimal system of counting:

1.	i	11.	doh-o-i	21.	vist-o-i	40.	čel, de-vist
2.	de	12.	doh-o-de	22.	vist-o-de	50.	pincö, de-vist-do
3.	here	13.	doh-o-here	23.	vist-o-here	60.	šešt, here-vist
4.	čö	14.	doh-o-čör	24.	vist-o-čö	70.	haftö, here-vist-do
5.	pinǰ	15.	doh-o-pinǰ	25.	vist-o-pinǰ	80.	haštö, čö-vist
6.	šoš	16.	doh-o-šoš	26.	vist-o-šoš	90.	nâvör, čö-vist-do
7.	hoft	17.	doh-o-hoft	27.	vist-o-hoft	100.	so, pij-vist
8.	hašt	18.	doh-o-hašt	28.	vist-o-hašt	300.	here-so
9.	nov	19.	doh-o-nov	29.	vist-o-nov	1000.	hazö
10.	do	20.	vist	30.	si, vist-e-do	2000.	d-hazö

=== Sample words ===
arina Friday
ruzare 'west'
ruz 'sun'
parare 'below'
parpe 'above'
-are 'under'
oev (öv) 'water'
voer 'wind'
hoev 'sister'
isbaa 'dog'

== See also ==
- Tati language (Iran)
