= Osman Efendîyo Babij =

Kurdish religious figure

Osman Efendîyo Babij or Osman Esad (born 1852 in Siverek – died in 1929 in Siverek) was a Kurdish religious figure and Mufti of Siverek whose 1903 book Mawlûd is known to be the second published book in Zaza.

== Biography ==
Babij was born in the village of Bab (Kapıkaya) in Siverek, Ottoman Empire. His father Hacı Eyüp Efendi was Mufti of Siverek and Babij spoke Arabic, Kurmanji Kurdish and Ottoman Turkish beside Zaza. Babij followed his father and was the Mufti of Siverek for 24 years from 1904 to 1929. He died 82 years old in Siverek and is buried in the town.

His main work Mawlûd was written in 1903 but only published in 1933 by Celadet Alî Bedirxan. The original text was in Zaza in Arabic script but Mehemed Malmîsanij transcribed the text into Latin script in 1985. Mawlûd is sectioned into eight parts and has 196 couplets.

== Bibliography ==
- Lezgîn, Roşan (2009), Among social Kurdish groups – General glance at Zazas, translated by Aydın, Nusret
- Özer, Osman (2016). "Mevlid – Ahmed-i Hasi" (PDF). Bingöl University Publications.
