= Northern Zaza =

Dialect of Zaza

- Pronunciation: Zaza pronunciation: [dɪmɪlki]
- Native to: Turkey
- Region: Parts of eastern, central and northeastern parts of Anatolia
- Ethnicity: Zazas
- Native speakers: 0.2 million (2016)
- Language family: Indo-European: Indo-Iranian; Iranian; Western; Northwestern; Adharic; Zaza; Northern Zaza
- Dialects: Tunceli; Varto
- Writing system: Latin script

Language codes
- ISO 639-2: kiu
- ISO 639-3: kiu
- Glottolog: kirm1248
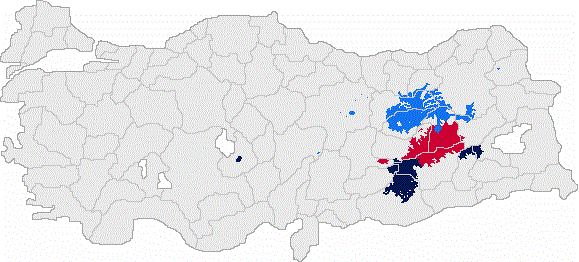
- Northern Zaza, shaded in light blue

Northern Zaza, is one of the three primary dialects of the Zaza language, spoken by the Zaza people. The dialect is also referred to as Zonê Ma, Kırmancki, So-Bê, Dımılki, Zazaki, Dersimki, Dersimce or Alevice by its speakers.

== Classification ==
Glottolog classifies Northern Zaza within the Adharic subgroup of the Northwestern Iranian languages branch of the Iranian languages. Northern Zaza consists of two sub-dialects, Tunceli and Varto:

- Northwestern Iranian
  - Adharic
    - Adhari (Old Azeri)
    - Zaza (Zaza)
      - Southern Zaza
      - Northern Zaza
    - Tatic (Tati-Talysh)
    - Gurani

== History ==
While early linguistic investigations of Zaza primarily concentrated on the Southern dialect, it is noteworthy that the Armenian traveler Andranik, during his late 19th-century regional travels, documented vocabulary and expressions from the Dersim dialect of Northern Zaza within his work.

== Speakers ==
Northern Zaza is spoken predominantly in Erzincan, Kemah, Aşkale, Hozat, Hınıs, Kelkit, Nazimiye, Ovacık, Pülümür, Tekman, Tercan, Varto, Zara, Çayırlı and Yayladere. Speakers of Northern Zaza adhere to the doctrines of Zaza Alevism. The number of Northern Zaza speakers was estimated to be around 0.2 million people in 2016.

== Grammar ==
Northern Zaza differs from other dialects of Zaza in phonological, morphological, syntactic, and lexical aspects. The dialect exhibits significant innovations, most notably within its phonological system. Sustained centuries-long cohabitation and sociocultural contact between Zazas and Armenians in Eastern Anatolia have resulted in significant phonological restructuring of Northern Zaza, aligning it with Armenian patterns. Compared to other dialects of the language, the least difference is found in its syntax, while the most significant differences are found in phonology. The phonological changes between s and š, c and g and č and k are noteworthy. Morphologically, the feminine suffix is realized as an unstressed /-e/ in Northern Zaza, whereas it is realized as /-ı/ in Southern Zaza.
