= Old Azeri =

Ancient Iranian language

- Azeri/Azari, Adhari
- آذری Āzarī
- Native to: Iran
- Region: Iranian Azerbaijan
- Ethnicity: Azaris
- Era: c. 700–300 BCE evolved from Median, c. 300–700 CE formation and adoption, 891 CE earliest surviving attestation, c. 1600 CE end of dominance
- Language family: Indo-European: Indo-Iranian; Iranian; Western; Northwestern; Adharic; Old Azeri
- Writing system: Persian alphabet

Language codes
- ISO 639-3: None (mis)
- Glottolog: adha1238

Old Azeri (آذری, Āzarī; also spelled Adhari, Azeri or Azari) is the extinct Iranian language that was once spoken in the northwestern Iranian historic region of Azerbaijan (Iranian Azerbaijan) before the Turkification of the Azerbaijani people. Some linguists believe the southern Tati varieties of Iranian Azerbaijan around Takestan such as the Harzandi and Karingani dialects to be remnants of Old Azeri. Along with Tati dialects, Old Azeri is known to have strong affinities with Talysh and Zaza languages and both Zaza and Talysh are considered to be remnants of Old Azeri. Iranologist linguist W. B. Henning demonstrated that Harzandi has many common linguistic features with both Talysh and Zaza and positioned Harzandi between the Talysh and Zaza. Old Azeri was the dominant Iranic language in Azerbaijan before it was replaced by Azerbaijani, which is a Turkic language.

== Linguistic affiliation ==
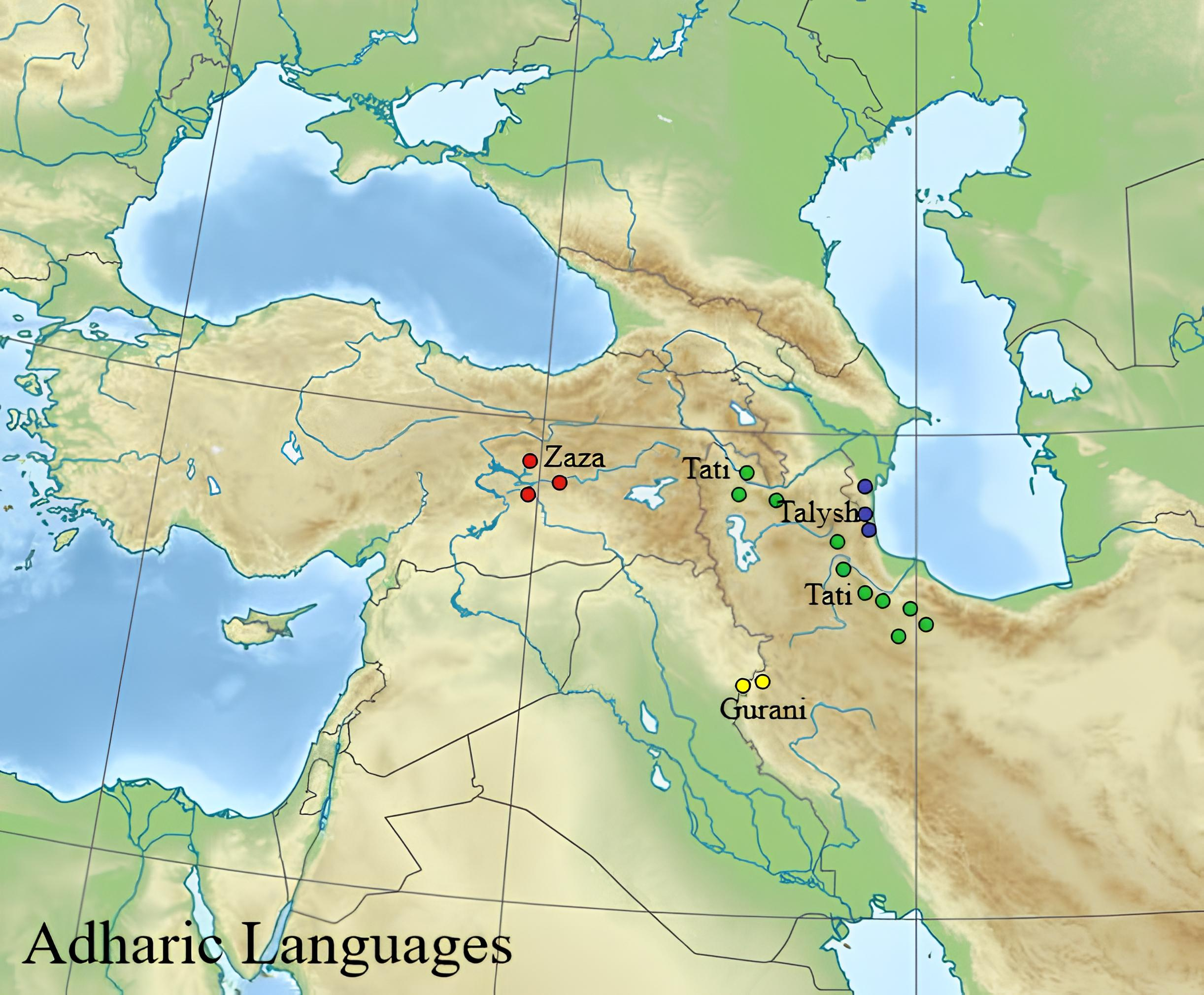
Modern Northwestern Iranian dialects (Adharic languages) believed to be linguistically closely related to Old Azeri.

Glottolog classifies Old Adhari within the Adharic subgroup of the Northwestern Iranian languages along with languages such as Tati of Iran and its dialects such as Harzandi, Kajali, and Kilit, Talysh, Zaza and Gurani:

- Northwest Iranian
  - Adharic
    - Adhari (Old Azeri) †
    - Tatic
      - Alamuti
      - Central Tatic
        - Talysh
      - Northern Tatic
        - Harzandi
        - Kilit
      - Southern Tatic
        - Alviri-Vidari
        - Vafs
          - Ashtiani
      - Ramand-Karaj
        - Razajerdi
        - Takestani
          - Khalkhal
          - Kharaqani
          - Ramandi
          - Tarom
          - Zanjan
    - Gorani
      - Gurani
      - Shabaki-Bajelani
    - Zaza
      - Southern Zaza
      - Northern Zaza
        - Tunceli
        - Varto

It shares many characteristics and common words and linguistic affinity with Zaza and considered a transitional dialect between Tati/Talysh and Zaza. Furthermore, Henning notes many common linguistic features with Zaza as well, based on the existence of two genuine plural cases in both languages, the ablative postposition -ri, Zaza -rā, the negative prefix in Harzandi čini(ya) 'it is not', Zaza činyo, činya and characteristic vocabulary. Therefore, Zaza and Talysh, along with Tati dialects, have also been considered to be remnants of the Old Azeri language. Modern Azeri dialects exhibit certain distinct phonological developments that differentiate them from other Northwestern Iranian languages. Among the Northwestern Iranian languages, only Āzarī (modern Tati dialects), Talysh, Zaza, and Gurani display a clearly regular northern development for the consonant clusters rd and rz.

== Initial studies ==
Ahmad Kasravi, a preeminent Iranian Azeri scholar and linguist, was the first scholar who examined the Iranian language of Iran's historic Azerbaijan region. He conducted comprehensive research using Arabic, Persian, Turkish and Greek historical sources and concluded that Old Azeri was the language of this region of Iran before it adopted the Turkic language of the same name. Historical research showed that Azeris were an Iranic people before the arrival of Seljuq Turks to the region.

=== Historical affiliations ===
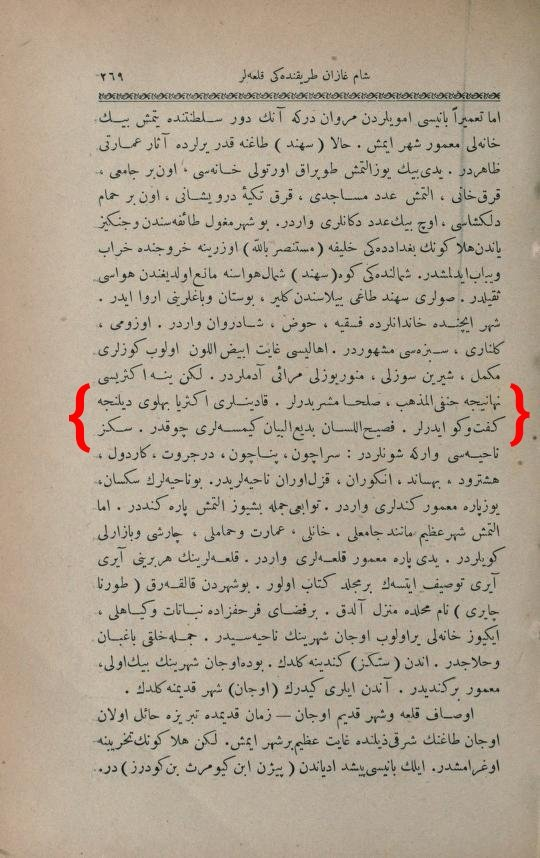
A page from the travelogue of Evliya Çelebi, the Ottoman world traveler, which deals with the spread of the Azeri language among the women of Maragheh city in the 10th century AH.

Old Azari was spoken in most of Azerbaijan at least up to the 17th century, with the number of speakers decreasing since the 11th century due to the Turkification of the area. According to some accounts, it may have survived for several centuries after that up to the 16th or 17th century. Today, Iranian dialects are still spoken in several linguistic enclaves within Azarbaijan. While some scholars believe that these dialects form a direct continuation of the ancient Azari languages, others have argued that they are likely to be a later import through migration from other parts of Iran, and that the original Azari dialects became extinct.

According to Vladimir Minorsky, around the 9th or 10th century:

The original sedentary population of Azarbayjan consisted of a mass of peasants and at the time of the Arab conquest was compromised under the semi-contemptuous term of Uluj ("non-Arab")—somewhat similar to the raya (*ri’aya) of the Ottoman empire. The only arms of this peaceful rustic population were slings, see Tabari, II, 1379-89. They spoke a number of dialects (Adhari, Talishi) of which even now there remains some islets surviving amidst the Turkish speaking population. It was this basic population on which Babak leaned in his revolt against the caliphate.

Clifford Edmund Bosworth says:

We need not take seriously Moqaddasī’s assertion that Azerbaijan had seventy languages, a state of affairs more correctly applicable to the Caucasus region to the north; but the basically Iranian population spoke an aberrant, dialectical form of Persian (called by Masʿūdī al-āḏarīya) as well as standard Persian, and the geographers state that the former was difficult to understand.

Igrar Aliyev states that:

1. In the writing of medieval Arab historians (Ibn Hawqal, Muqqaddesi..), the people of Azarbaijan spoke Azari.

2. This Azari was without doubt an Iranian language because it is also contrasted with Dari but it is also mentioned as Persian. It was not the same as the languages of the Caucasus mentioned by Arab historians.

3. Azari is not exactly Dari (name used for the Khorasanian Persian which is the Modern Persian language). From the research conducted by researchers upon this language, it appears that this language is part of the NW Iranian languages and was close to Talyshi language. Talyshi language has kept some of the characteristics of the Median language.

Aliyev states that medieval Muslim historians such as al-Baladhuri, al-Masudi, ibn Hawqal and Yaqut al-Hamawi mentioned this language by name. Other such writers are Estakhri, Ibn al-Nadim, Hamza al-Isfahani, al-Muqaddasi, Ya'qubi, Hamdallah Mustawfi and Muhammad ibn Musa al-Khwarizmi.

According to Gilbert Lazard, "Azarbaijan was the domain of Adhari, an important Iranian dialect which Masudi mentions together with Dari and Pahlavi."

According to Richard N. Frye, Azari was a major Iranian language and the original language of Iranian Azerbaijan. It gradually lost its status as the majority language by the end of the 14th century.

== Historical attestations ==
Ebn al-Moqaffa’ (died 142/759) is quoted by ibn Al-Nadim in his famous Al-Fihrist as stating that Azerbaijan, Nahavand, Rayy, Hamadan and Esfahan speak Fahlavi (Pahlavi) and collectively constitute the region of Fahlah.

A very similar statement is given by the medieval historian Hamzeh Isfahani when talking about Sassanid Iran. Hamzeh Isfahani writes in the book Al-Tanbih ‘ala Hoduth alTashif that five "tongues" or dialects, were common in Sassanian Iran: Fahlavi, Dari, Persian, Khuzi and Soryani. Hamzeh (893-961 CE) explains these dialects in the following way:

Fahlavi was a dialect which kings spoke in their assemblies and it is related to Fahleh. This name is used to designate five cities of Iran, Esfahan, Rey, Hamadan, Man Nahavand, and Azerbaijan. Persian is a dialect which was spoken by the clergy (Zoroastrian) and those who associated with them and is the language of the cities of Fars. Dari is the dialect of the cities of Ctesiphon and was spoken in the kings' /dabariyan/ 'courts'. The root of its name is related to its use; /darbar/ 'court* is implied in /dar/. The vocabulary of the natives of Balkh was dominant in this language, which includes the dialects of the eastern peoples. Khuzi is associated with the cities of Khuzistan where kings and dignitaries used it in private conversation and during leisure time, in the bath houses for instance.

Ibn Hawqal states:

The language of the people of Azerbaijan and most of the people of Armenia is Iranian (al-farssya), which binds them together, while Arabic is also used among them; among those who speak al-faressya (here he seemingly means Persian, spoken by the elite of the urban population), there are few who do not understand Arabic; and some merchants and landowners are even adept in it".

Ibn Hawqal mentions that some areas of Armenia are controlled by Muslims and others by Christians.

Abu al-Hasan Ali ibn al-Husayn Al-Masudi (896-956), the Arab historian states:

The Persians are a people whose borders are the Mahat Mountains and Azarbaijan up to Armenia and Aran, and Bayleqan and Darband, and Ray and Tabaristan and Masqat and Shabaran and Jorjan and Abarshahr, and that is Nishabur, and Herat and Marv and other places in land of Khorasan, and Sejistan and Kerman and Fars and Ahvaz...All these lands were once one kingdom with one sovereign and one language...although the language differed slightly. The language, however, is one, in that its letters are written the same way and used the same way in composition. There are, then, different languages such as Pahlavi, Dari, Azari, as well as other Persian languages.

Al-Moqaddasi (died late 10th century) considers Azerbaijan as part of the 8th division of lands. He states:"The languages of the 8th division is Iranian (al-‘ajamyya). It is partly Dari and partly convoluted (monqaleq) and all of them are named Persian".

Al-Moqaddasi also writes on the general region of Armenia, Arran and Azerbaijan and states:

They have big beards, their speech is not attractive. In Arminya they speak Armenian, in al-Ran, Ranian (the Caucasian Albanian language). Their Persian is understandable, and is close to Khurasanian (Dari Persian) in sound

Ahmad ibn Yaqubi mentions that the People of Azerbaijan are a mixture of Azari 'Ajams ('Ajam is a term that developed to mean Iranian) and old Javedanis (followers of Javidan the son of Shahrak who was the leader of Khurramites and succeeded by Babak Khorramdin).

Zakariya b. Mohammad Qazvini's report in Athar al-Bilad, composed in 1275, that "no town has escaped being taken over by the Turks except Tabriz" (Beirut ed., 1960, p. 339) one may infer that at least Tabriz had remained aloof from the influence of Turkish until the time.

From the time of the Mongol invasion, most of whose armies were composed of Turkic tribes, the influence of Turkish increased in the region. On the other hand, the old Iranian dialects remained prevalent in major cities. Hamdallah Mostawafi writing in the 1340s calls the language of Maraqa as "modified Pahlavi" (Pahlavi-ye Mughayyar). Mostowafi calls the language of Zanjan (Pahlavi-ye Raast). The language of Gushtaspi covering the Caspian border region between Gilan to Shirvan is called a Pahlavi language close to the language of Gilan.

Following the Islamic Conquest of Iran, Middle Persian, also known as Pahlavi, continued to be used until the 10th century when it was gradually replaced by a new breed of Persian language, most notably Dari. The Saffarid dynasty in particular was the first in a line of many dynasties to officially adopt the new language in 875 CE. Thus Dari is considered the continuation of Middle Persian which was prevalent in the early Islamic era of western Iran. The name Dari comes from the word (دربار) which refers to the royal court, where many of the poets, protagonists, and patrons of the literature flourished.

=== The Iranian dialect of Tabriz ===
According to Jean During, the inhabitants of Tabriz did not speak Turkish in the 15th century.

The language of Tabriz, being an Iranian language, was not the standard Khurasani Dari. Qatran Tabrizi (11th century) has an interesting couplet mentioning this fact:

بلبل به سان مطرب بیدل فراز گل
گه پارسی نوازد، گاهی زند دری

Translation:
The nightingale is on top of the flower like a minstrel who has lost her/his heart

It bemoans sometimes in Parsi (Persian) and sometimes in Dari (Khurasani Persian)

There are extant words, phrases, sentences and poems attested in the old Iranian dialect of Tabriz in a variety of books and manuscripts.

Hamdullah Mustuwafi (14th century) mentions a sentence in the language of Tabriz:

تبارزه اگر صاحب حُسنی را با لباس ناسزا یابند، گویند "انگور خلوقی بی چه در، درّ سوه اندرین"؛ یعنی انگور خلوقی (انگوری مرغوب) است در سبد دریده

"The Tabrizians have a phrase when they see a fortunate and wealthy man in a uncouth clothes: "He is like fresh grapes in a ripped fruit basket."

A Macaronic (mula'ma which is popular in Persian poetry where some verses are in one language and another in another language) poem from Homam Tabrizi, where some verses are in Khorasani (Dari) Persian and others are in the dialect of Tabriz.

بدیذم چشم مستت رفتم اژ دست // كوام و آذر دلی كویا بتی مست // دل‌ام خود رفت و می‌دانم كه روژی // به مهرت هم بشی خوش گیانم اژ دست // به آب زندگی ای خوش عبارت // لوانت لاود جمن دیل و گیان بست // دمی بر عاشق خود مهربان شو // كزی سر مهرورزی كست و نی كست // به عشق‌ات گر همام از جان برآیذ // مواژش كان بوان بمرت وارست // كرم خا و ابری بشم بوینی // به بویت خته بام ژاهنام

Another Ghazal from Homam Tabrizi where all the couplets except the last couplet is in Persian. The last couplet reads:

«وهار و ول و دیم یار خوش بی // اوی یاران مه ول بی مه وهاران» Transliteration: Wahar o wol o Dim yaar khwash Bi Awi Yaaraan, mah wul Bi, Mah Wahaaraan

Translation: The Spring and Flowers and the face of the friend are all pleasant But without the friend, there are no flowers or a spring.

Another recent discovery by the name of Safina-yi Tabriz has given sentences from native of Tabriz in their peculiar Iranian dialect. The work was compiled during the Ilkhanid era. A sample expression from the mystic Baba Faraj Tabrizi in the Safina:

انانک قده‌ی فرجشون فعالم آندره اووارادا چاشمش نه پیف قدم کینستا نه پیف حدوث

Standard Persian (translated by the author of Safina himself):

چندانک فرج را در عالم آورده‌اند چشم او نه بر قِدَم افتاده است نه بر حدوث

Modern English:

They brought Faraj in this world in such a way that his eye is neither towards pre-eternity nor upon createdness.

The Safina (written in the Ilkhanid era) contains many poems and sentences from the old regional dialect of Azerbaijan. Another portion of the Safina contains a direct sentence in what the author has called "Zaban-i-Tabriz" (dialect/language of Tabriz)

دَچَان چوچرخ نکویت مو ایر رهشه مهر دورش
چَو ِش دَ کارده شکویت ولَول ودَارد سَر ِ یَوه
پَری بقهر اره میر دون جو پور زون هنرمند
پروکری اَنزوتون منی که آن هزیوه
اکیژ بحتَ ورامرو کی چرخ هانزمَویتی
ژژور منشی چو بخت اهون قدریوه
نه چرخ استه نبوتی نه روزو ورو فوتی
زو ِم چو واش خللیوه زمم حو بورضی ربوه

A sentence in the dialect of Tabriz (the author calls Zaban-i-Tabriz (dialect/language of Tabriz) recorded and also translated by Ibn Bazzaz Ardabili in the Safvat al-Safa:

«علیشاه چو در آمد گستاخ وار شیخ را در کنار گرفت و گفت حاضر باش بزبان تبریزی گو حریفر ژاته یعنی سخن بصرف بگو حریفت رسیده است. در این گفتن دست بر کتف مبارک شیخ زد شیخ را غیرت سر بر کرد» The sentence: "Gu Harif(a/e)r Zhaatah" is mentioned in Tabrizi Dialect.

A sentence in the dialect of Tabriz by Pir Zehtab Tabrizi addressing the Qara-qoyunlu ruler Eskandar:

اسکندر، رودم کشتی، رودت کشاد "Eskandar, Roodam Koshti, Roodat Koshaad!"

(Eskandar, you killed my son, may your son perish!")

The word Rood for son is still used in some Iranian dialects, especially the Larestani dialect and other dialects around Fars.

Four quatrains titled fahlavvviyat from Khwaja Muhammad Kojjani (died 677/1278-79); born in Kojjan or Korjan, a village near Tabriz, recorded by Abd-al-Qader Maraghi. A sample of one of the four quatrains from Khwaja Muhammad Kojjani

همه کیژی نَهَند خُشتی بَخُشتی
بَنا اج چو کَه دستِ گیژی وَنیژه
همه پیغمبران خُو بی و چو کِی
محمدمصطفی کیژی وَنیژه

Two qet'as (poems) quoted by Abd-al-Qader Maraghi in the dialect of Tabriz (died 838/1434-35; II, p. 142). A sample of one these poems

رُورُم پَری بجولان
نو کُو بَمَن وُرارده
وی خَد شدیم بدامش
هیزا اَوُو وُرارده

A Ghazal and fourteen quatrains under the title of fahlaviyat by the poet Maghrebi Tabrizi (died 809/1406-7).

A text probably by Mama Esmat Tabrizi, a mystical woman-poet of Tabriz (died 15th century), which occurs in a manuscript, preserved in Turkey, concerning the shrines of saints in Tabriz.

A phrase "Buri Buri" which in Persian means Biya Biya or in English: Come! Come! is mentioned by Rumi from the mouth of Shams Tabrizi in this poem:

«ولی ترجیع پنجم درنیایم جز به دستوری
که شمس‌الدین تبریزی بفرماید مرا بوری
مرا گوید بیا، بوری که من باغم تو زنبوری
که تا خونت عسل گردد که تا مومت شود نوری»

The word Buri is mentioned by Hussain Tabrizi Karbali with regards to the Shaykh Khwajah Abdur-rahim Azh-Abaadi as to "come".

In the Harzandi dialect of Harzand in Azerbaijan as well as the Karingani dialect of Azerbaijan, both recorded in the 20th century, the two words "Biri" and "Burah" means to "come" and are of the same root.

=== On the language of Maragheh ===
Hamdollah Mostowfi of the 13th century mentions the language of Maragheh as "Pahlavi Mughayr" (modified Pahlavi).

The 17th-century Ottoman Turkish traveler Evliya Chelebi who traveled to Safavid Iran also states: "The majority of the women in Maragheh converse in Pahlavi".

According to the Encyclopedia of Islam: "At the present day, the inhabitants speak Adhar Turkish, but in the 14th century they still spoke "arabicized Pahlawi" (Nuzhat al-Qolub: Pahlawi Mu’arrab) which means an Iranian dialect of the north western group."

== See also ==
- Azari or the Ancient Language of Azerbaijan
- Languages of Azerbaijan
- Languages of Iran
- Tati (Iran)
- Safina-yi Tabriz
- Nozhat al-Majales

== Sources ==
- Frye, R. N. (2004). "Iran v. Peoples of Iran (1) A General Survey". In Yarshater, Ehsan (ed.). Encyclopædia Iranica. Vol. XIII/3: Iran II. Iranian history–Iran V. Peoples of Iran. London and New York: Routledge & Kegan Paul. pp. 321–326. ISBN 978-0-933273-89-4.
- Lazard, G. (1975). "The Rise of the New Persian Language". In Frye, Richard N. (ed.). The Cambridge History of Iran: From the Arab Invasion to the Saljuqs. Vol. 4. Cambridge: Cambridge University Press. pp. 595–633. ISBN 0-521-20093-8.
- Henning, Walter Bruno (1954), "THE ANCIENT LANGUAGE OF AZEEBAIJAN", Transactions of the Philological Society, 53 (1): 157–177, doi:10.1111/j.1467-968X.1954.tb00282.x
- Hadank, Karl (1932). Mundarten der Zâzâ: Hauptsächlich aus Siwerek und Kor. Berlin: Verlag der Preussischen Akademie.
- Lornejad, Siavash; Doostzadeh, Ali (2012). Arakelova, Victoria; Asatrian, Garnik (eds.). On the modern politicization of the Persian poet Nezami Ganjavi (PDF). Caucasian Centre for Iranian Studies. Archived from the original (PDF) on 2022-09-14.
- Yarshater, E. (1988). "Azerbaijan vii. The Iranian Language of Azerbaijan". In Yarshater, Ehsan (ed.). Encyclopædia Iranica. Vol. III/3: Azerbaijan IV–Bačča(-ye) Saqqā. London and New York: Routledge & Kegan Paul. pp. 238–245. ISBN 978-0-71009-115-4.
- Paul, Ludwig (1998). "The Position of Zazaki Among West Iranian languages". In Sims-Williams, Nicholas (ed.). Proceedings of the Third European Conference of Iranian Studies held in Cambridge, 11th to 15th September 1995. Vol. I: Old and Middle Iranian Studies. Wiesbaden: Ludwig Reichert. pp. 163–177.
