= Savat, Lice =

Village in Turkey

Savat
- Neighbourhood
- Location in Turkey
- Coordinates: 38°20′38″N 40°37′28″E
- Country: Turkey
- Province: Diyarbakır
- District: Lice
- Population (2022): 272
- Time zone: UTC+3 (TRT)

Savat (Kurdish: Hezan) is a neighbourhood in the municipality and district of Lice, Diyarbakır Province in Turkey. It is populated by Kurds and had a population of 272 in 2022.

== Notable people ==
- Ehmedê Xasî
