= Ehmedê Xasî =

Kurdish poet (1866–1951)

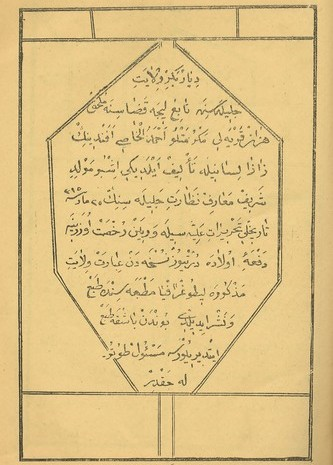
Page from his 1899 work

Ehmedê Xasî (born in 1866/67 in Lice – died 18 February 1951) was a Kurdish literary figure and Mufti. He is best known for his work Mewlîdu'n-Nebîyyî'l-Qureyşîyyî from 1899 which is considered the first literary work in Zaza.

== Biography ==
Xasî was born in the 1866 or 1867 in the village of Hêzan (Xas) near Lice which was part of the Ottoman Empire. He was from the Xas tribe and his family stemmed from Bingöl. He received his education in a madrasa taught under a Molla Hasan and later moved to Diyarbakır where he was taught by Molla Mustafa Hatib and later Mufti İbrahim Efendi at the Great Mosque of Diyarbakır. From around 1911, he served in different administrative positions; first as the Müderris of Diyarbakir and thereafter transferred to his home village where he remained as a Müderris. After staying there for a while, he was appointed Mufti of Lice, a position he remained at for two years. By the time he resigned as Mufti, his influence spread from Bingöl to Siverek.

He was a staunch opponent of the Committee of Union and Progress and was exiled to Rhodes in March 1909. He would be released by Mehmed V. During this period, Xasî had many arguments with Turkish nationalist Ziya Gökalp.

Xasî spoke Zaza, Kurmanji Kurdish, Turkish, Arabic and Persian. Most of his works were burned by his grandson after the 1971 Turkish military memorandum.

== Mewlid ==
Xasî wrote his main work Mewlîdu'n-Nebîyyî'l-Qureyşîyyî in 1899 and about 400 copies were printed in 1900. The mawlid had 14 chapters and 366 couplets.

== Bibliography ==
- Barnas, Rojen (1985), Poème à la naissance du Prophète – Ehmede Xasî et 'Usman Efendî (PDF) (in Dimli), archived from the original (PDF) on 9 July 2021
- Dagilma, Ibrahim (2015), "Ahmedê Xasî'nin Hayatı ve Mewlid Adlı Eserinde Tema", Bingöl University Institute of Languages Journal (in Turkish), vol. 1, Bingöl University
- Lezgîn, Roşan (2009), Among social Kurdish groups – General glance at Zazas, translated by Aydın, Nusret
- Malmîsanij, Mehemed (2021), "The Kirmanjki (Zazaki) Dialect of Kurdish Language and the Issues it Faces", in Bozarslan, Hamit (ed.), The Cambridge History of the Kurds, Cambridge University Press, doi:10.1017/9781108623711.026, S2CID 235541104
