= Vafsi dialect =

Iranian language spoken in the Vafs village

Vafsi
- Native to: Iran
- Region: Markazi province
- Native speakers: 23,000 (2021)
- Language family: Indo-European: Indo-Iranian; Iranian; Western; Northwestern; Adharic; Tatic; Southern Tatic; Vafsic; Vafsi

Language codes
- ISO 639-3: vaf
- Glottolog: vafs1240
- ELP: Vafsi
- Vafsi is classified as Definitely Endangered by the UNESCO Atlas of the World's Languages in Danger

Vafsi (Tati: ووسی, Vowsi) is a dialect of the Tati language spoken in the Vafs village and surrounding area in the Markazi province of Iran. The dialects of the Tafresh region share many features with the Central Plateau dialects. It is closely related to Ashtiani.

== Phonology ==
Vafsi Tati has six short vowel phonemes, five long vowel phonemes and two nasal vowel phonemes. The consonant inventory is basically the same as in Persian.

== Grammar ==
Nouns are inflected for gender (masculine, feminine), number (singular, plural) and case (direct, oblique). The oblique case marks the possessor (preceding the head noun), the definite direct object, nouns governed by a preposition, and the subject of transitive verbs in the past tense. Personal pronouns are inflected for number (singular, plural) and case (direct, oblique). A set of enclitic pronouns is used to indicate the agent of transitive verbs in the past tenses.

There are two demonstrative pronouns: one for near deixis, one for remote deixis. The use of the Persian ezafe construction is spreading, however there is also a native possessive construction, consisting of the possessor (unmarked or marked by the oblique case) preceding the head noun.

The verbal inflection is based on two stems: present and past stem. Person and number are indicated personal suffixes attached to the stem. In the transitive past tense the verb consists of the bare past stem and personal concord with the subject is provided by enclitic pronouns following the stem or a constituent preceding the verb. Two modal prefixes are used to convey modal and aspectual information. The past participle is employed in the formation of compound tenses.

Vafsi Tati is a split ergative language: Split ergativity means that a language has in one domain accusative morphosyntax and in another domain ergative morphosyntax. In Vafsi the present tense is structured the accusative way and the past tense is structured the ergative way. Accusative morphosyntax means that in a language subjects of intransitive and transitive verbs are treated the same way and direct objects are treated another way. Ergative morphosyntax means that in a language subjects of intransitive verbs and direct objects are treated one way and subjects of transitive verbs are treated another way.

In the Vafsi past tense subjects of intransitive verbs and direct objects are marked by the direct case whereas subjects of transitive verbs are marked by the oblique case. This feature characterizes the Vafsi past tense as ergative.

The unmarked order of constituents is SOV, similar to most other Iranian languages.

=== Numerals ===
Numerals are transcribed in the IPA.

| 1. jej | 21. vis-o-jej |
| 2. do | 22. vis-o-do |
| 3. sɛ | 23. vis-o-sɛ |
| 4. t͡ʃɑr | 24. vis-o-t͡ʃɑr |
| 5. pɛd͡ʒ | 25. vis-o-ped͡ʒ |
| 6. ʃiʃ | 26. vis-o-ʃiʃ |
| 7. hæf(d) | 27. vis-o-hæf(d) |
| 8. hæʃ(d) | 28. vis-o-hæʃ(d) |
| 9. no | 29. vis-o-no |
| 10. dæ(h) | 30. si |
| 11. jɑzdæ(h) | 40. t͡ʃɛl |
| 12. dævazdæ(h) | 50. pænd͡ʒɑ |
| 13. sizdæ(h) | 60. ʃas(d) |
| 14. t͡ʃɑrdæ(h) | 70. hæftɑd |
| 15. panzæ(h) | 80. hæʃtɑd |
| 16. ʃanzæ(h) | 90. nævæd |
| 17. hɛvdæ(h) | 100. sæd) |
| 18. hɛʒdæ(h) | 200. divisd |
| 19. nuzæ(h) | 1000. hæzɑr |
| 20. vis | 2000. do hæzɑr |
