= Tekman =

- District and municipality
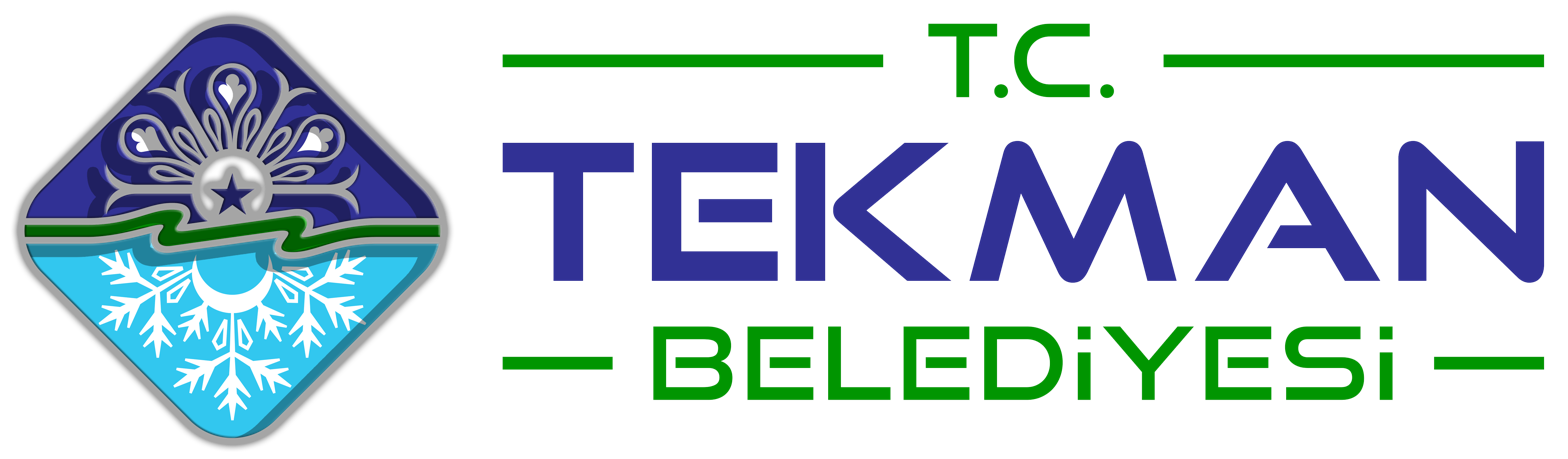

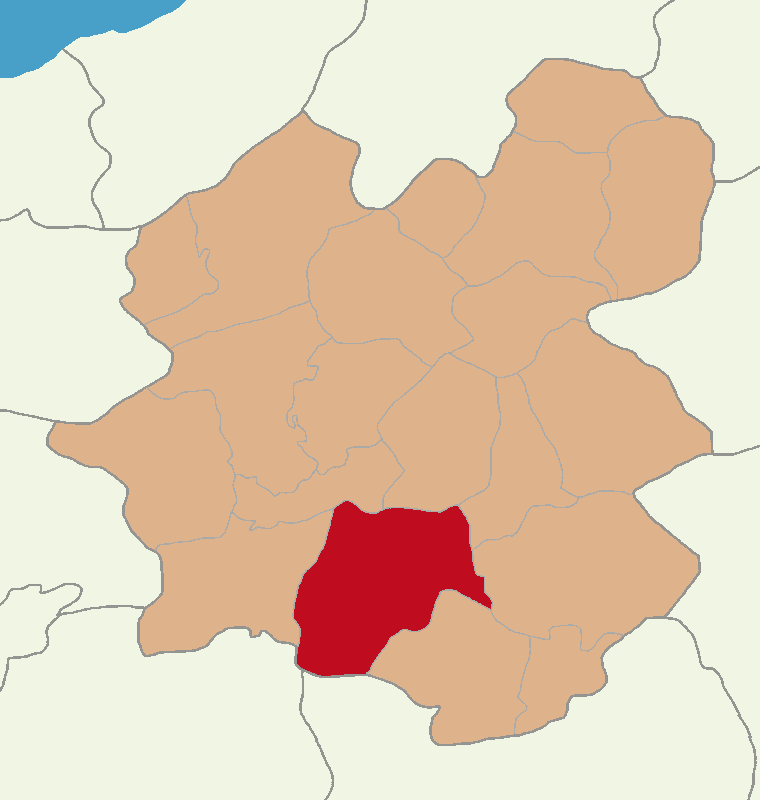
- Map showing Tekman District in Erzurum Province

- Location within Turkey
- Coordinates: 39°38′42″N 41°30′30″E
- Country: Turkey
- Province: Erzurum

Government
  - Mayor: Mustafa Ergin (AKP)
- Area: 2,102 km^{2} (812 sq mi)
- Population (2022): 23,195
  - Density: 11.03/km^{2} (28.58/sq mi)
- Time zone: UTC+3 (TRT)
- Postal code: 25560
- Area code: 0442
- Climate: Dsb
- Website: www.tekman.bel.tr

Tekman (Kurdish: Tatos) is a municipality and district of Erzurum Province, Turkey. Its area is 2,102 km^{2}, and its population is 23,195 (2022). The mayor is Mustafa Ergin (AKP).

== Geography ==
The south of the district is surrounded by the Bingöl Mountains.

== Composition ==
There are 71 neighbourhoods in Tekman District:

- Ağcakoca
- Akdağ
- Akdamar
- Akpınar
- Alabayır
- Aşağıhanbeyi
- Aşağıtepecik
- Aydınlı
- Aydınlık
- Beşdere
- Beyköy
- Çağlar
- Çatak
- Çatkale
- Çayırdağı
- Çevirme
- Çiçekdağı
- Cihan
- Çukuryayla
- Dalsöğüt
- Deliler
- Dengiz
- Düzyurt
- Erence
- Geçitköy
- Gökoğlan
- Gözlüce
- Gülveren
- Gümüşlük
- Gündamı
- Güneşli
- Gürgür
- Güzeldere
- Hacıömer
- Hamzalar
- Hürriyet
- Hüseyinağa
- Ilıgöze
- İncesu
- Işıklar
- İsmetpaşa
- Kalaycı
- Karapınar
- Karataş
- Karatepe
- Karlıca
- Katranlı
- Kayaboğaz
- Kazancık
- Kırıkhan
- Koçyayla
- Körsu
- Küllü
- Kuruca
- Mescitli
- Mollamehmet
- Şakşak
- Susuz
- Taşkesen
- Toptepe
- Turnagöl
- Vatan
- Yalınca
- Yerköy
- Yeşilören
- Yiğitler
- Yoncalı
- Yücepınar
- Yukarıhanbeyi
- Yukarıtepecik
- Yuvaklı
