= Siverek =

- District and municipality
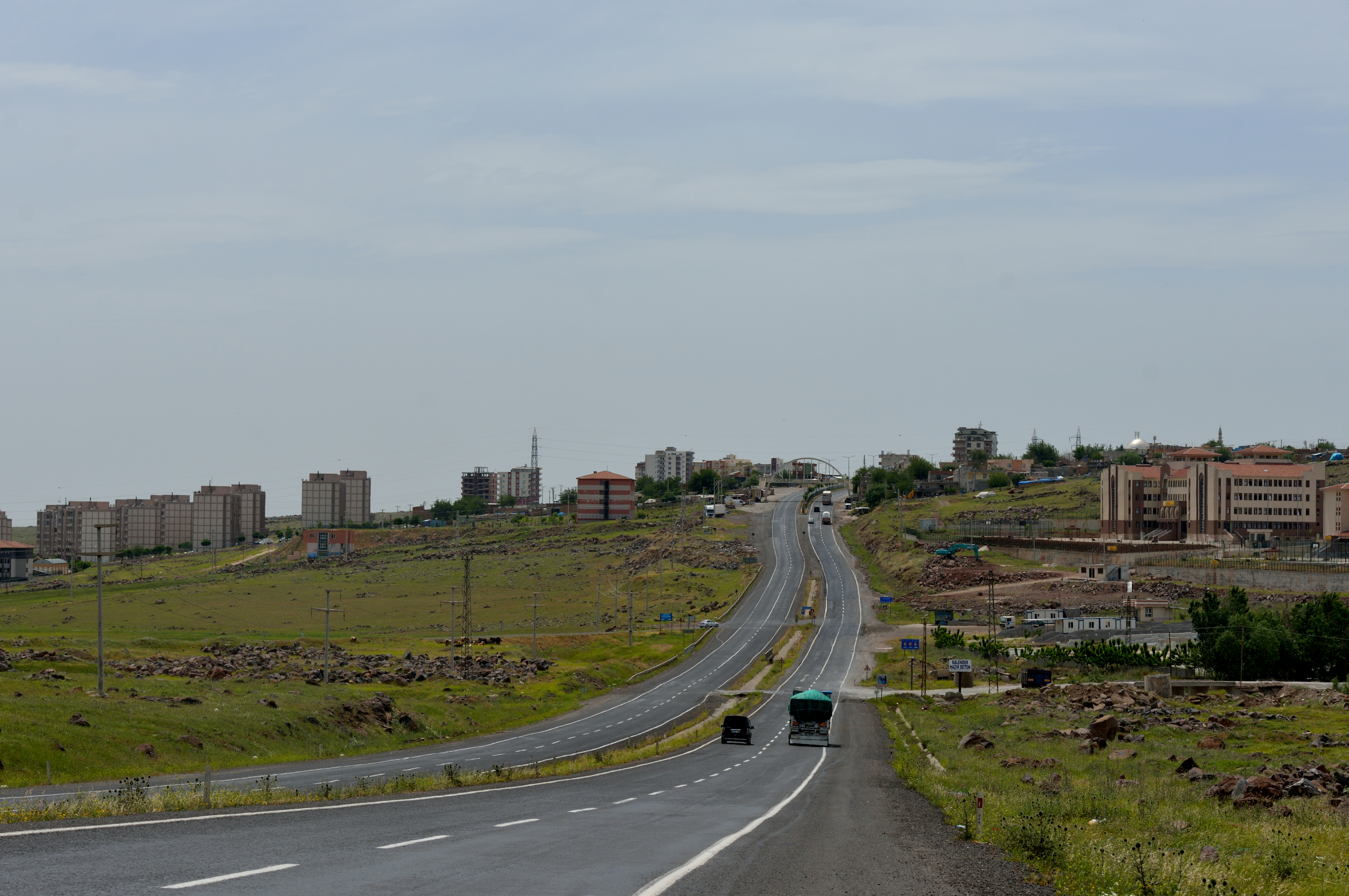
- A view from Siverek, 2016

- Logo

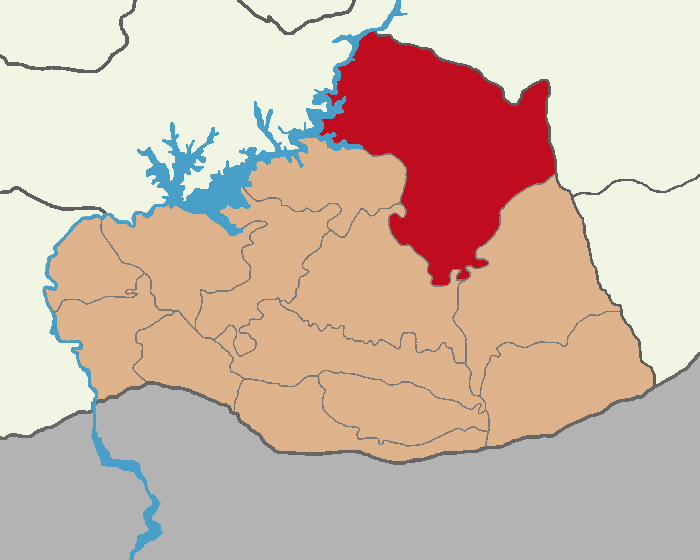
- Map showing Siverek District in Şanlıurfa Province

- Location within Turkey Location within Şanlıurfa
- Coordinates: 37°45′15″N 39°19′4″E
- Country: Turkey
- Province: Şanlıurfa

Government
  - Mayor: Ali Murat Bucak (AKP)
- Area: 3,936 km^{2} (1,520 sq mi)
- Population (2022): 267,942
  - Density: 68.07/km^{2} (176.3/sq mi)
- Time zone: UTC+3 (TRT)
- Postal code: 63600
- Area code: 0414
- Website: www.siverek.bel.tr

Siverek (Armenian: Սեւավերակ, romanized: Sevaverag, lit. 'black ruins'; Zazaki: Soyreg; Kurdish: Sêwreg) is a municipality and district of Şanlıurfa Province, Turkey. Its area is 3,936 km^{2}, and its population is 267,942 (2022). Siverek is in the Şanlıurfa province but is geographically closer to the larger city of Diyarbakır (approx. 83 km).

== Etymology ==
Siverek was historically known in medieval Arabic as Hisn ar-Ran (Arabic: حصن الران), which was corrupted into Greek as Chasanara (Greek: Χασαναρᾶ), as found in the Escorial Taktikon.

The word "Siverek" is of Armenian origin. In Byzantine sources, it is mentioned as Sevaverag. The literal meaning of this name used for Siverek in Byzantine and Armenian sources is Sev "black" and Averag "ruins". Other ways to spell Sevaverag include Sebabarak, Sebabarok, Sevaverak, Severags and Suveyda.

== History ==
The town came under Byzantine control sometime after AD 956 and had become the seat of a strategos by the early 970s. Together with Edessa, Gargar, Samosata and Hisn Mansur formed part of the Byzantine defence system up to the 1060s when 200 Frankish horsemen were stationed there.

In the Ottoman Empire period, Siverek was within the Diyarbekir vilayet, and it had several Christian settlements.

=== 2026 school shooting ===
On 14 April 2026, a school shooting occurred at the Ahmet Koyuncu Vocational and Technical Anatolian High School in Siverek, Şanlıurfa Province, Turkey. Sixteen people were injured before the perpetrator, 19-year-old Ömer Ket, committed suicide. Twenty-eight hours after the shooting, another school shooting occurred in the Onikişubat district of Kahramanmaraş.

== Demographics ==
9,275 Armenians lived in the kaza on the eve of the First World War according to the Armenian Patriarchate of Constantinople. They had eight churches and three schools. 5,450 Armenians and 1,200 Assyrians lived in the town of Siverek. 6,550 Assyrians lived in 32 surrounding villages. Armenian men were massacred in May 1915, followed by the deportation of the women and children, as part of the Armenian genocide. Faiz El-Ghusein reported that the road between Urfa and Severek was littered with corpses.

== Politics ==
In common with other districts of Şanlıurfa, business and politics in Siverek are strongly influenced, even controlled, by a powerful clan. Siverek is the home town of Sedat Bucak, the former DYP member of parliament who survived the car crash in the Susurluk scandal. He is the leader of the Bucak tribe, one of whom has represented the area in the Turkish Parliament since its foundation. Sedat Bucak remains a friend of former DYP leader Mehmet Ağar. In the local elections in March 2019, Şehmus Aydın was elected mayor. He resigned due to health problems in 2020, and was succeeded by Ayşe Çakmak (AKP). The current kaymakam is Musa Aydemir.

== Composition ==
There are 180 neighbourhoods in Siverek District:

- Abdalağa
- Alagün
- Alanyurt
- Altaylı
- Altınahır
- Altınlı
- Altınpınar
- Anacak
- Armağanlı
- Aşağı Alınca
- Aşağı Karabahçe
- Aşağı Karacaören
- Aşağıyalankoz
- Aşlıca
- Atmaca
- Avurtepe
- Ayrancı
- Ayvanat
- Azıklı
- Bağcı
- Bağlar
- Bahçe
- Bahçelievler
- Bakı Takoran
- Bakırca
- Bakmaç
- Bardakçı
- Başbük
- Başdeğirmen
- Batı
- Bayırözü
- Beğdeş
- Benek
- Beyali
- Beybaba
- Beyçeri
- Böğürtlen
- Bozkuyu
- Bozlak
- Bürüncek
- Büyük Kazanlı
- Büyük Oba
- Büyük Tepe
- Büyük Yakıtlı
- Büyükgöl
- Çağa
- Çağdaş
- Camiikebir
- Çanakçı
- Canpolat
- Çatlı
- Çavuşlu
- Çaylarbaşı
- Çeltik
- Çepni
- Çevirme
- Çiftçibaşı
- Çinhisar
- Çubuklu
- Dağbaşı
- Damlıca
- Dardağan
- Darıcalı
- Deliktaş
- Dicle
- Dilekli
- Direkli
- Divan
- Doğukent
- Dönemeç
- Düğerin
- Ediz
- Eğriçay
- Endarlı
- Erbey
- Ergen
- Erkonağı
- Ertem
- Eskihan
- Esmerçayı
- Fırat
- Fırın
- Gaziköy
- Gedik
- Gerçek
- Gözcek
- Gözelek
- Gözeli
- Gülabibey
- Güllice
- Gülpınar
- Güney
- Güney Karabahçe
- Gürakar
- Güvenli
- Güvercin
- Güzelpınar
- Hacıömer
- Haliliye
- Hamamören
- Hamidiye
- Hasançelebi
- Hasırlı
- Hayriye
- İleri
- İnanlı
- Kale
- Kalemli
- Kalınağaç
- Kamışlı
- Kapıkaya
- Karabahçe
- Karacadağ
- Karadibek
- Karahisar
- Karakeçi
- Karakoyun
- Kargalı
- Karkaşı
- Karpuzcu
- Kavaklıdere
- Kavalık
- Kayalı
- Kayseri
- Keçiburcu
- Keçikıran
- Keş
- Kesmekaya
- Kıvançlı
- Konurtepe
- Küçükgöl
- Kulaksız
- Küptepe
- Kurbağalı
- Kuşlugöl
- Mezraa
- Narlıkaya
- Nohut
- Ofis
- Oluklu
- Onar
- Önder
- Örgülü
- Ortanca
- Oyman
- Oyuktaş
- Peynirci
- Sabancı
- Şairibrahimrafet
- Salur
- Sarıdam
- Sarıkaya
- Sarıören
- Savucak
- Şekerli
- Selimpınar
- Şirinkuyu
- Sislice
- Soydan
- Söylemez
- Sumaklı
- Tanrıverdi
- Taşağıl
- Taşhan
- Taşıkara
- Taşlı
- Turna
- Ülkülü
- Üstüntaş
- Uzunpınar
- Uzunziyaret
- Yeleken
- Yeniceli
- Yenişehir
- Yoğunca
- Yoğurtçu
- Yücelen
- Yumrutepe
- Yuvar
- Zincirliçay

== Climate ==
Siverek has a hot-summer Mediterranean climate (Köppen climate classification: Csa).

Climate data for Siverek (1991–2020)
Month	Jan	Feb	Mar	Apr	May	Jun	Jul	Aug	Sep	Oct	Nov	Dec	Year
Mean daily maximum °C (°F)	8.3 (46.9)	9.8 (49.6)	14.6 (58.3)	20.0 (68.0)	26.3 (79.3)	33.2 (91.8)	37.7 (99.9)	37.6 (99.7)	32.6 (90.7)	25.3 (77.5)	16.6 (61.9)	10.3 (50.5)	22.8 (73.0)
Daily mean °C (°F)	4.2 (39.6)	5.3 (41.5)	9.5 (49.1)	14.4 (57.9)	20.1 (68.2)	26.5 (79.7)	30.8 (87.4)	30.5 (86.9)	25.4 (77.7)	19.0 (66.2)	11.1 (52.0)	6.0 (42.8)	17.0 (62.6)
Mean daily minimum °C (°F)	1.0 (33.8)	1.7 (35.1)	5.1 (41.2)	9.3 (48.7)	14.1 (57.4)	19.5 (67.1)	23.5 (74.3)	23.3 (73.9)	18.7 (65.7)	13.7 (56.7)	6.8 (44.2)	2.7 (36.9)	11.7 (53.1)
Average precipitation mm (inches)	90.75 (3.57)	77.1 (3.04)	78.65 (3.10)	63.55 (2.50)	41.21 (1.62)	11.59 (0.46)	1.52 (0.06)	1.87 (0.07)	8.43 (0.33)	37.64 (1.48)	65.09 (2.56)	88.36 (3.48)	565.76 (22.27)
Average precipitation days (≥ 1.0 mm)	9	9	8.1	7.7	5.6	2.3	2	1.9	2.1	4.3	5.9	9.1	67
Average relative humidity (%)	72.3	69.9	64.5	61.4	53.3	38.1	32.1	34.7	39.4	51.3	62.8	71.8	54.2
Source: NOAA

== Notable people ==
- Osman Efendîyo Babij (1852-1929), Kurdish religious figure
- Yılmaz Güney (1937–1984), Kurdish film director, scenarist, novelist and actor
- Necmettin Büyükkaya, (1943-1984), Kurdish activist
- Mehmed Uzun (1953–2007), Kurdish writer
- Sedat Bucak (b. 1960), politician
- Adnan Selçuk Mızraklı (b. 1963), politician
- İbrahim Ayhan (1968-2018), politician
- Filiz İşikırık (b. 1993), footballer
- Remziye Bakır (b. 1997), footballer

== Sources ==
- Beihammer, Alexander Daniel (2017). Byzantium and the Emergence of Muslim Turkish Anatolia, ca. 1040-1130. Routledge. ISBN 978-1-138-22959-4.
