= Ashtiani language =

Northwestern Iranian language of Iran

Ashtiani
- Ashtiyani
- Native to: Iran
- Region: Ashtian, Tafresh
- Native speakers: 27,000 (2021)
- Language family: Indo-European: Indo-Iranian; Iranian; Western; Northwestern; Adharic; Tatic; Southern Tatic; Vafsic; Ashtiani

Language codes
- ISO 639-3: atn
- Glottolog: asht1244
- ELP: Ashtiani

Ashtiani (آشتیانی) is one of the Northwestern Iranian dialects and is a dialect of the Tati language of Iran spoken in Ashtian of Iran.

It is sometimes considered a transitional dialect between the Northwestern Iranian languages and Talysh and is very close to Vafsi. Its speakers are also bilingual in Persian.
