= Karl Hadank =

Karl Hadank (* 21 February 1882 in Kesselsdorf, County of Löwenberg in Silesia; † 1945 in Berlin-Friedrichshagen) was a German Orientalist and Scholar for Iranian Studies.

Hadank was the son of Pastor Emil Hadank and his wife Marie, née Voigt. He attended the Gymnasium in Cottbus and the Friedrich-Wilhelms-Gymnasium in Berlin, where he graduated in 1901. He then studied history and geography in Berlin. In 1905, he received his doctorate from the Friedrich Wilhelms University of Berlin (today Humboldt University zu Berlin) with a dissertation on the Battle of Cortenuova. Hadank worked as a teacher but was temporarily released from teaching duties. On behalf of the Prussian Academy of Sciences, he reworked the manuscript collections compiled by the orientalist Oskar Mann, who died in 1917, and published part of them. In 1932, he undertook research trips to Damascus and Baghdad and expanded the collection of oriental manuscripts. During his work, he learned various dialects and made i.a. contributions in the field of Iranian language research, publishing and the first comprehensive scholarly grammar of the Zaza language under the title „Mundarten der Zaza". Hadank worked from 1919 until his death in 1945 on the papers of Oskar Mann, but was unable to complete his work. The closely intertwined papers of Hadank and Oskar Mann are located in the Berlin State Library (Staatsbibliothek zu Berlin) and in the Archive of the Berlin-Brandenburg Academy of Sciences and Humanities (Berlin-Brandenburgische Akademie der Wissenschaften). From 2009, they were scientifically indexed in a project funded by the German Research Foundation (Deutsche Forschungsgemeinschaft) and represent important sources on the history of German Oriental Studies.

== Publications ==
- Zur Klassifizierung westiranischer Sprachen: aus dem Nachlaß. In: Acta orientalia. Vol. 53/1992, pp. 28–75.
- Untersuchungen zum Westkurdischen: Bōtī und Ēzädī. Institut für Lautforschung an der Universität Berlin, O. Harrassowitz, Berlin 1938.
- Mundarten der Zâzâ, mainly from Siwerek und Kor. Verlag der Preussischen Akademie der Wissenschaften (in Kommission bei W. de Gruyter), Berlin 1932.
- Die Mundarten der Gûrân, besonders das Kändûläî, Auramânî und Bâdschälânî. Verlag der Preussischen Akademie der Wissenschaften, Berlin 1930.
- Die Mundarten von Khunsâr, Mahallât, Natänz, Nâyin, Sämnân, Sîvänd und Sô-kohrûd. W. de Gruyter, Berlin 1926.
