= Emamzadeh Abdollah, Sorkheh =

Village in Semnan province, Iran

Emamzadeh Abdollah Persian: امامزاده عبدالله
- Village
- Location within Iran
- Coordinates: 35°31′13″N 52°55′44″E
- Country: Iran
- Province: Semnan
- County: Sorkheh
- District: Central
- Rural District: Emamzadeh Abdollah

Population (2016)
  - Total: 141
- Time zone: UTC+3:30 (IRST)

Emamzadeh Abdollah (Persian: امامزاده عبدالله) (Note: Also romanized as Emāmzādeh ‘Abdollāh; also known as Imāmzādeh ‘Abdullāh) is a village in, and the capital of, Emamzadeh Abdollah Rural District in the Central District (Note: Formerly Sorkheh District of Semnan County) of Sorkheh County, Semnan province, Iran.

== Demographics ==
=== Population ===
At the time of the 2006 National Census, the village's population was 53 in 28 households, when it was in Hafdar Rural District of Sorkheh District (Note: Renamed the Central District of Sorkheh County) in Semnan County. The following census in 2011 counted 142 people in 65 households. The 2016 census measured the population of the village as 141 people in 61 households, by which time the district had been separated from the county in the establishment of Sorkheh County.

In 2021, the district was renamed the Central District and Emamzadeh Abdollah was transferred to Emamzadeh Abdollah Rural District created in the same district. Hafdar Rural District was separated from the district in the formation of Hafdar District.
