= Arvaneh =

Village in Semnan province, Iran

Arvaneh Persian: اروانه
- Village
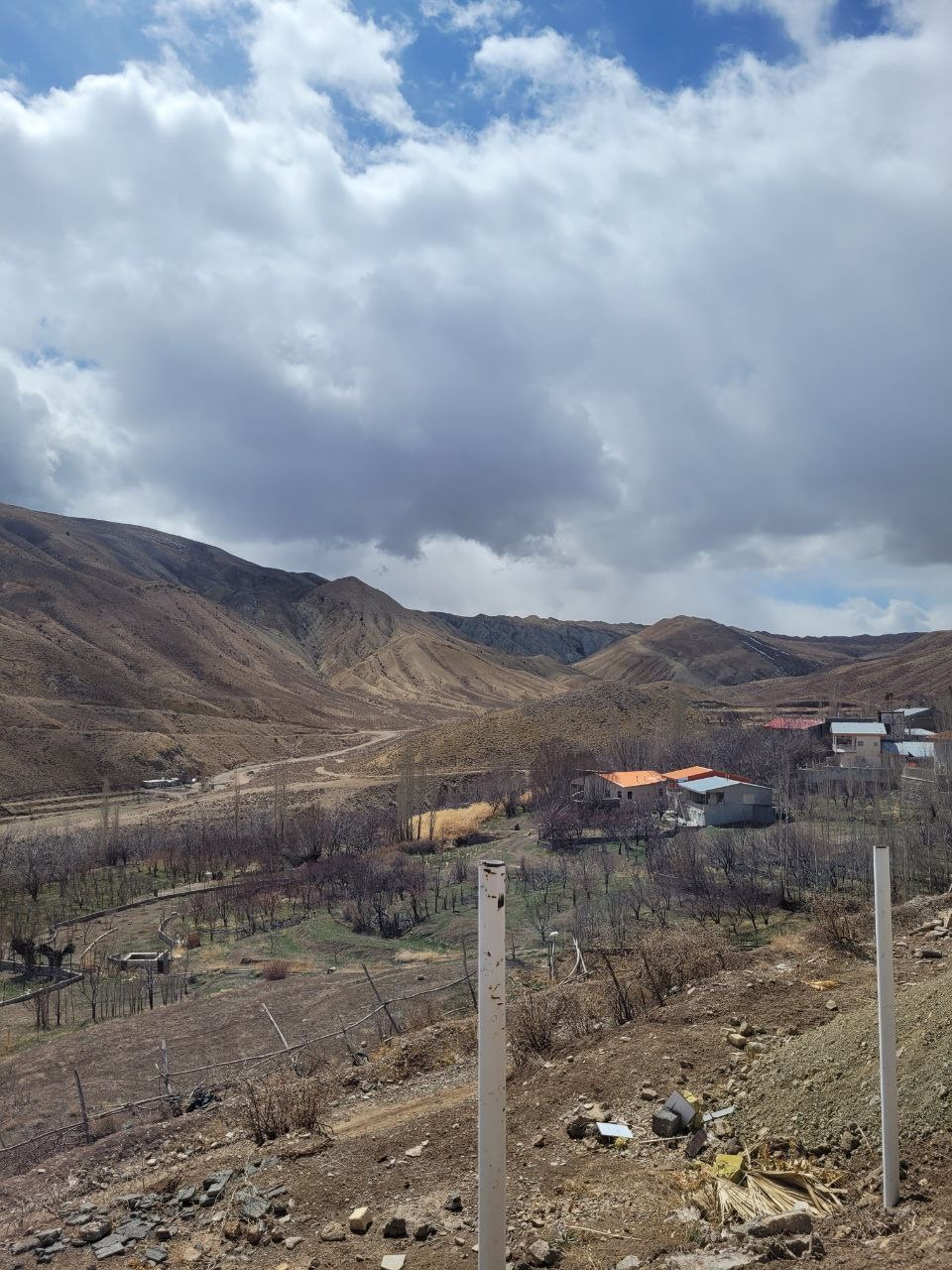
- The village of Arvaneh in the spring

- Location within Iran
- Coordinates: 35°34′58″N 53°02′23″E
- Country: Iran
- Province: Semnan
- County: Sorkheh
- District: Hafdar
- Rural District: Hafdar

Population (2016)
  - Total: 437
- Time zone: UTC+3:30 (IRST)

Arvaneh (Persian: اروانه) (Note: Also romanized as Arvāneh) is a village in Hafdar Rural District in Hafdar District of Sorkheh County, Semnan province, Iran.

== Demographics ==
=== Language ===
The native language of the people in Arvaneh is Tati.

=== Population ===
At the time of the 2006 National Census, the village's population was 104 in 43 households, when it was in Sorkheh District (Note: Renamed the Central District of Sorkheh County) of Semnan County. The following census in 2011 counted 249 people in 79 households. The 2016 census measured the population of the village as 437 people in 145 households, by which time the district had been separated from the county in the establishment of Sorkheh County.

In 2021, the district was renamed the Central District and the rural district was separated from it in the formation of Hafdar District.
