= Abdollahabad-e Bala =

Village in Semnan province, Iran

Abdollahabad-e Bala Persian: عبداله آباد بالا
- Village
- Location within Iran
- Coordinates: 35°22′42″N 52°53′34″E
- Country: Iran
- Province: Semnan
- County: Sorkheh
- District: Central
- Rural District: Emamzadeh Abdollah

Population (2016)
  - Total: 96
- Time zone: UTC+3:30 (IRST)

Abdollahabad-e Bala (Persian: عبداله آباد بالا) (Note: Also romanized as ‘Abdollāhābād-e Bālā; also known as ‘Abdollāhābād) is a village in Emamzadeh Abdollah Rural District of the Central District (Note: Formerly Sorkheh District of Semnan County) in Sorkheh County, Semnan province, Iran.

== Demographics ==
=== Population ===
At the time of the 2006 National Census, the village's population was 34 in 20 households, when it was in Lasgerd Rural District of Sorkheh District (Note: Renamed the Central District of Sorkheh County) in Semnan County. The following census in 2011 counted 87 people in 47 households. The 2016 census measured the population of the village as 96 people in 39 households, by which time the district had been separated from the county in the establishment of Sorkheh County.

In 2021, the district was renamed the Central District and Abdollahabad-e Bala was transferred to Emamzadeh Abdollah Rural District created in the same district.
