= Ich, Semnan =

Village in Semnan province, Iran

Ich Persian: ايچ
- Village
- Location within Iran
- Coordinates: 35°28′36″N 52°58′29″E
- Country: Iran
- Province: Semnan
- County: Sorkheh
- District: Central
- Rural District: Emamzadeh Abdollah

Population (2016)
  - Total: 75
- Time zone: UTC+3:30 (IRST)

Ich (Persian: ايچ) (Note: Also romanized as Īch; also known as Īj) is a village in Emamzadeh Abdollah Rural District of the Central District (Note: Formerly Sorkheh District of Semnan County) in Sorkheh County, Semnan province, Iran.

== Demographics ==
=== Population ===
At the time of the 2006 National Census, the village's population was 63 in 32 households, when it was in Lasgerd Rural District of Sorkheh District (Note: Renamed the Central District of Sorkheh County) in Semnan County. The following census in 2011 counted 145 people in 62 households. The 2016 census measured the population of the village as 75 people in 37 households, by which time the district had been separated from the county in the establishment of Sorkheh County.

In 2021, the district was renamed the Central District and Ich was transferred to Emamzadeh Abdollah Rural District created in the same district.
