= Sufiabad, Semnan =

Village in Semnan province, Iran

Sufiabad Persian: صوفي آباد
- Village
- Location within Iran
- Coordinates: 35°27′25″N 53°19′10″E
- Country: Iran
- Province: Semnan
- County: Sorkheh
- District: Central
- Rural District: Lasgerd

Population (2016)
  - Total: 154
- Time zone: UTC+3:30 (IRST)

Sufiabad (Persian: صوفي آباد) (Note: Also romanized as Şūfīābād) is a village in Lasgerd Rural District of the Central District (Note: Formerly Sorkheh District of Semnan County) in Sorkheh County, Semnan province, Iran.

== Demographics ==
=== Population ===
At the time of the 2006 National Census, the village's population was 51 in 17 households, when it was in Sorkheh District (Note: Renamed the Central District of Sorkheh County) of Semnan County. The following census in 2011 counted 45 people in 16 households. The 2016 census measured the population of the village as 154 people in 46 households, by which time the district had been separated from the county in the establishment of Sorkheh County.

The district was renamed the Central District in 2021.
