= Asad Aba =

Village in Semnan province, Iran

Asad Aba Persian: اسد آبا
- Village
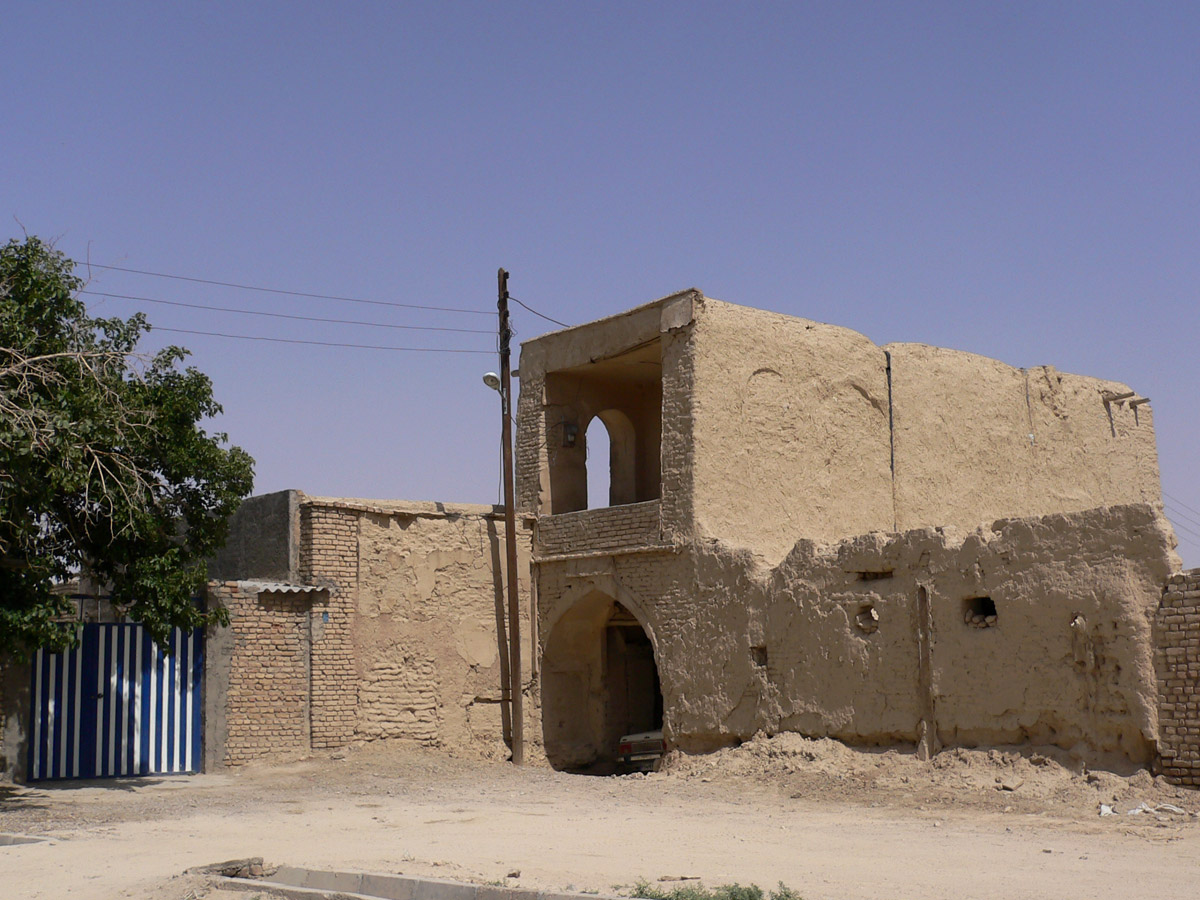
- The village of Asad Aba

- Location within Iran
- Coordinates: 35°24′54″N 53°07′39″E
- Country: Iran
- Province: Semnan
- County: Sorkheh
- District: Central
- Rural District: Lasgerd

Population (2016)
  - Total: 121
- Time zone: UTC+3:30 (IRST)

Asad Aba (Persian: اسد آبا) (Note: Also romanized as Āsad Ābā; also known as Asadābād) is a village in Lasgerd Rural District of the Central District (Note: Formerly Sorkheh District of Semnan County) in Sorkheh County, Semnan province, Iran.

== Demographics ==
=== Population ===
At the time of the 2006 National Census, the village's population was 93 in 25 households, when it was in Sorkheh District (Note: Renamed the Central District of Sorkheh County) of Semnan County. The following census in 2011 counted 70 people in 28 households. The 2016 census measured the population of the village as 121 people in 44 households, by which time the district had been separated from the county in the establishment of Sorkheh County.

The district was renamed the Central District in 2021.
