= Jovin, Semnan =

Village in Semnan province, Iran

Jovin Persian: جوين
- Village
- Location within Iran
- Coordinates: 35°29′23″N 52°53′36″E
- Country: Iran
- Province: Semnan
- County: Sorkheh
- District: Central
- Rural District: Emamzadeh Abdollah

Population (2016)
  - Total: 161
- Time zone: UTC+3:30 (IRST)

Jovin (Persian: جوين) (Note: Also romanized as Javīn, Jawīn, Joveyn, and Jovīn) is a village in Emamzadeh Abdollah Rural District of the Central District (Note: Formerly Sorkheh District of Semnan County) in Sorkheh County, Semnan province, Iran.

== Demographics ==
=== Population ===
At the time of the 2006 National Census, the village's population was 26 in 11 households, when it was in Lasgerd Rural District of Sorkheh District (Note: Renamed the Central District of Sorkheh County) in Semnan County. The following census in 2011 counted 158 people in 44 households. The 2016 census measured the population of the village as 161 people in 56 households, by which time the district had been separated from the county in the establishment of Sorkheh County.

In 2021, the district was renamed the Central District and Jovin was transferred to Emamzadeh Abdollah Rural District created in the same district.
