= Barkiyan =

Village in Semnan province, Iran

Barkiyan Persian: بركيان
- Village
- Location within Iran
- Coordinates: 35°26′19″N 53°03′40″E
- Country: Iran
- Province: Semnan
- County: Sorkheh
- District: Central
- Rural District: Lasgerd

Population (2016)
  - Total: 0
- Time zone: UTC+3:30 (IRST)

Barkiyan (Persian: بركيان) (Note: Also romanized as Bar-e Keyan and Barkīyān) is a village in Lasgerd Rural District of the Central District (Note: Formerly Sorkheh District of Semnan County) in Sorkheh County, Semnan province, Iran.

== Demographics ==
=== Population ===
At the time of the 2006 National Census, the village's population was 18 in six households, when it was in Sorkheh District (Note: Renamed the Central District of Sorkheh County) of Semnan County. The following census in 2011 counted a population below the reportoing threshold. The 2016 census measured the population of the village as zero, by which time the district had been separated from the county in the establishment of Sorkheh County.

The district was renamed the Central District in 2021.
