= Hajjiabad-e Khvoriad =

Hajjiabad-e Khvoriad حاجي آباد خورياد
- Village
- Location within Iran
- Coordinates: 35°30′55″N 53°29′51″E
- Country: Iran
- Province: Semnan
- County: Semnan
- Bakhsh: Central
- Rural District: Howmeh

Population (2006)
  - Total: 14
- Time zone: UTC+3:30 (IRST)
  - Summer (DST): UTC+4:30 (IRDT)

Hajjiabad-e Khvoriad (Persian: حاجي آباد خورياد, also Romanized as Ḩājjīābād-e Khvorīād; also known as Hājī Ābād, Ḩājjīābād, Ḩājjīābād-e Khūrīān, and Ḩājjīābād-e Khvorīān) is a village in Howmeh Rural District, in the Central District of Semnan County, Semnan Province, Iran. At the 2006 census, its population was 14, in 5 families.
