= Biyabanak =

Village in Semnan province, Iran

Biyabanak Persian: بيابانك
- Village
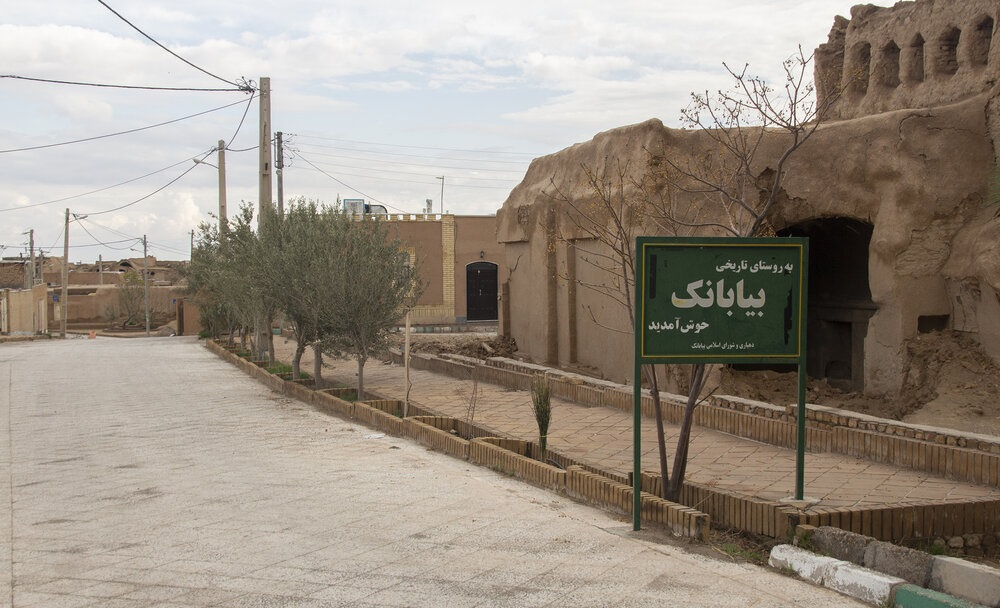
- The village of Biyabanak

- Location within Iran
- Coordinates: 35°24′44″N 53°16′04″E
- Country: Iran
- Province: Semnan
- County: Sorkheh
- District: Central
- Rural District: Lasgerd

Population (2016)
  - Total: 250
- Time zone: UTC+3:30 (IRST)

Biyabanak (Persian: بيابانك) (Note: Also romanized as Bīyābānaḵ) is a village in Lasgerd Rural District of the Central District (Note: Formerly Sorkheh District of Semnan County) in Sorkheh County, Semnan province, Iran.

== Demographics ==
=== Population ===
At the time of the 2006 National Census, the village's population was 352 in 131 households, when it was in Sorkheh District (Note: Renamed the Central District of Sorkheh County) of Semnan County. The following census in 2011 counted 241 people in 92 households. The 2016 census measured the population of the village as 250 people in 103 households, by which time the district had been separated from the county in the establishment of Sorkheh County.

The district was renamed the Central District in 2021.
