= Momenabad Rural District (Sorkheh County) =

Rural district in Semnan province, Iran

Momenabad Rural District Persian: دهستان مؤمن‌آباد
- Rural District
- Location within Iran
- Coordinates: 35°33′N 53°18′E
- Country: Iran
- Province: Semnan
- County: Sorkheh
- District: Hafdar
- Established: 2021
- Capital: Mowmenabad
- Time zone: UTC+3:30 (IRST)

Momenabad Rural District (Persian: دهستان مؤمن‌آباد) is in Hafdar District of Sorkheh County, Semnan province, Iran. Its capital is the village of Mowmenabad, whose population at the time of the 2016 National Census was 1,796 in 585 households.

== History ==
In 2012, Sorkheh District (Note: Renamed the Central District of Sorkheh County) was separated from Semnan County in the establishment of Sorkheh County, which was divided into one district of two rural districts, with Sorkheh as its capital and only city at the time. In 2021, the district was renamed the Central District and Hafdar Rural District was separated from it in the formation of Hafdar District. Momenabad Rural District was created in the new district.
