= Mowmenabad, Sorkheh =

Village in Semnan province, Iran

Mowmenabad Persian: مؤمن‌آباد
- Village
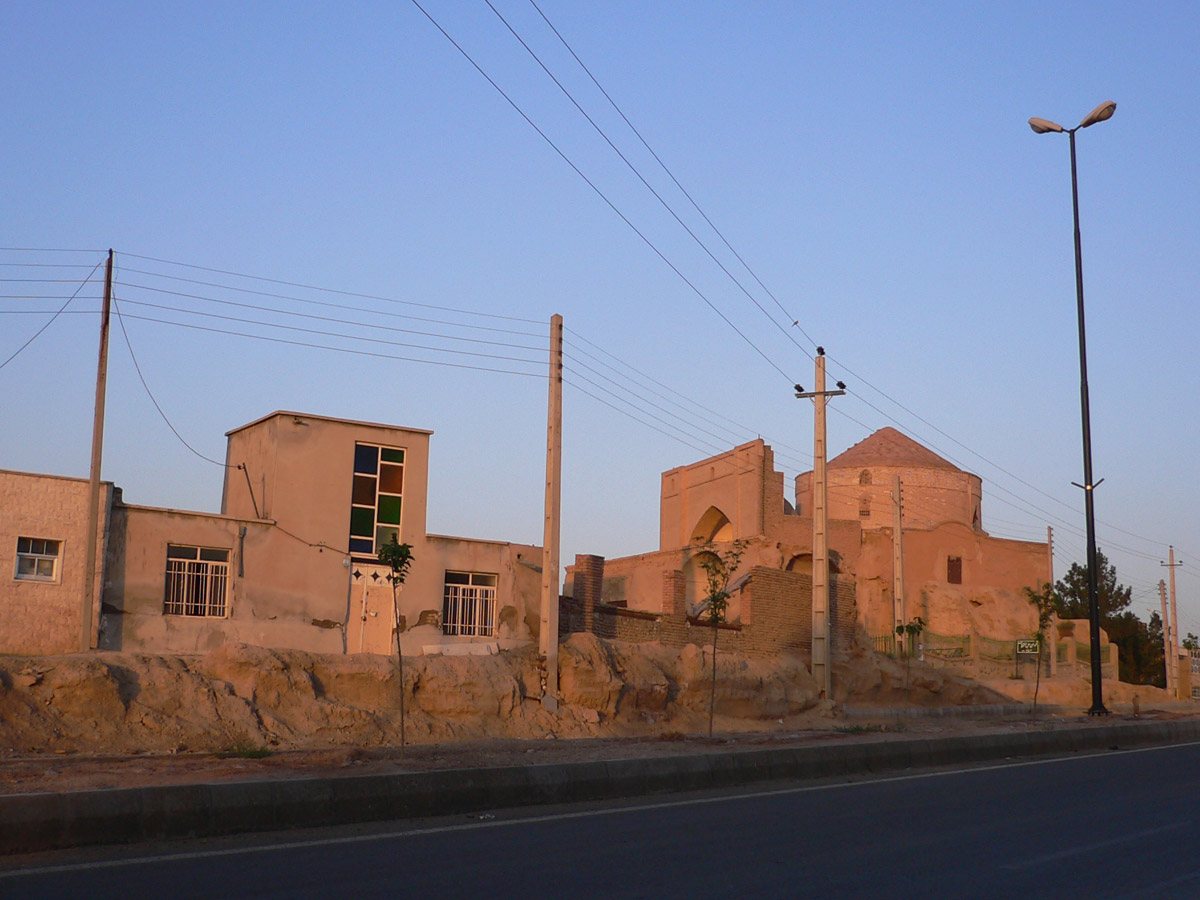
- The village of Mowmenabad

- Location within Iran
- Coordinates: 35°32′43″N 53°17′49″E
- Country: Iran
- Province: Semnan
- County: Sorkheh
- District: Hafdar
- Rural District: Momenabad

Population (2016)
  - Total: 1,796
- Time zone: UTC+3:30 (IRST)

Mowmenabad (Persian: مؤمن‌آباد) (Note: Also romanized as Mowmenābād and Mow’menābād; also known as Mo’menābād and Muminābād) is a village in Momenabad Rural District of Hafdar District in Sorkheh County, Semnan province, Iran, serving as capital of both the district and the rural district.

== Demographics ==
=== Population ===
At the time of the 2006 National Census, the village's population was 1,826 in 499 households, when it was in Hafdar Rural District of Sorkheh District (Note: Renamed the Central District of Sorkheh County) in Semnan County. The following census in 2011 counted 1,823 people in 524 households. The 2016 census measured the population of the village as 1,796 people in 585 households, by which time the district had been separated from the county in the establishment of Sorkheh County. The village was the most populous in its rural district.

In 2021, the district was renamed the Central District and the rural district was separated from it in the formation of Hafdar District. Mowmenabad was transferred to Momenabad Rural District created in the new district.
