= Roknabad, Semnan =

Village in Semnan province, Iran

Roknabad Persian: رکن آباد
- Village
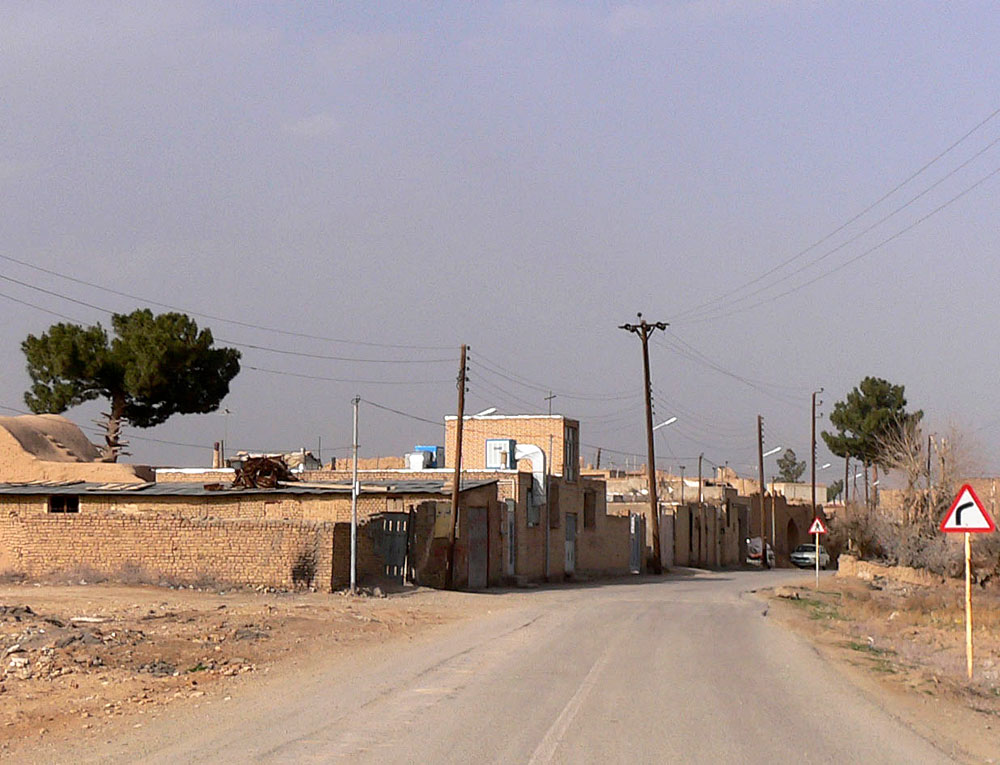
- The village of Roknabad

- Location within Iran
- Coordinates: 35°32′04″N 53°25′01″E
- Country: Iran
- Province: Semnan
- County: Semnan
- District: Central
- Rural District: Howmeh

Population (2016)
  - Total: 892
- Time zone: UTC+3:30 (IRST)

Roknabad (Persian: رکن‌آباد) (Note: Also romanized as Roknābād) is a village in Howmeh Rural District of the Central District in Semnan County, Semnan province, Iran.

== Demographics ==
=== Population ===
At the time of the 2006 National Census, the village's population was 1,025 in 256 households. The following census in 2011 counted 952 people in 288 households. The 2016 census measured the population of the village as 892 people in 263 households.
