= Kheyrabad, Semnan =

Village in Semnan province, Iran

Kheyrabad Persian: خير آباد
- Village
- Location within Iran
- Coordinates: 35°32′46″N 53°25′07″E
- Country: Iran
- Province: Semnan
- County: Semnan
- District: Central
- Rural District: Howmeh

Population (2016)
  - Total: 3,325
- Time zone: UTC+3:30 (IRST)

Kheyrabad (Persian: خير آباد) (Note: Also romanized as Kheyrābād) is a village in Howmeh Rural District of the Central District in Semnan County, Semnan province, Iran.

== Demographics ==
=== Population ===
At the time of the 2006 National Census, the village's population was 3,022 in 802 households. The following census in 2011 counted 3,527 people in 1,032 households. The 2016 census measured the population of the village as 3,325 people in 990 households, the most populous in its rural district.
