= Jam, Semnan =

Village in Semnan province, Iran

Jam Persian: جام
- Village
- Location within Iran
- Coordinates: 35°48′01″N 53°51′14″E
- Country: Iran
- Province: Semnan
- County: Semnan
- District: Central
- Rural District: Howmeh

Population (2016)
  - Total: 128
- Time zone: UTC+3:30 (IRST)

Jam (Persian: جام) (Note: Also romanized as Djam and Jām) is a village in Howmeh Rural District of the Central District in Semnan County, Semnan province, Iran.

== Demographics ==
=== Population ===
At the time of the 2006 National Census, the village's population was 182 in 56 households. The following census in 2011 counted 51 people in 22 households. The 2016 census measured the population of the village as 128 people in 52 households.
