= Emamzadeh Abdollah Rural District (Sorkheh County) =

Rural district in Semnan province, Iran

Emamzadeh Abdollah Rural District Persian: دهستان امامزاده عبدالله
- Rural District
- Location within Iran
- Coordinates: 34°54′N 53°00′E
- Country: Iran
- Province: Semnan
- County: Sorkheh
- District: Central
- Established: 2021
- Capital: Emamzadeh Abdollah
- Time zone: UTC+3:30 (IRST)

Emamzadeh Abdollah Rural District (Persian: دهستان امامزاده عبدالله) is in the Central District (Note: Formerly Sorkheh District of Semnan County) of Sorkheh County, Semnan province, Iran. Its capital is the village of Emamzadeh Abdollah, whose population at the time of the 2016 National Census was 141 people in 61 households.

== History ==
In 2012, Sorkheh District (Note: Renamed the Central District of Sorkheh County) was separated from Semnan County in the establishment of Sorkheh County, which was divided into one district of two rural districts, with Sorkheh as its capital and only city. In 2021, the district was renamed the Central District and Emamzadeh Abdollah Rural District was created in the same district.

== Other villages in the rural district ==
- Abdollahabad-e Bala
- Ich
- Jovin
