= Abkhuri =

Village in Semnan province, Iran

Abkhuri Persian: آبخوري
- Village
- Location within Iran
- Coordinates: 35°48′02″N 53°51′10″E
- Country: Iran
- Province: Semnan
- County: Semnan
- District: Central
- Rural District: Howmeh

Population (2016)
  - Total: 125
- Time zone: UTC+3:30 (IRST)

Abkhuri (Persian: آبخوري) (Note: Also romanized as Ābkhowrī and Ābkhūrī; formerly known as Abkhur (آبخور), also romanized as Ābkhūr; also known as Āb Kūrī, Āb-i-Kūri, Abkhuran (آبخوران), Abkhvor, Ābkhvor, and Ābkhvorī) is a village in Howmeh Rural District of the Central District in Semnan County, Semnan province, Iran.

== Demographics ==
=== Population ===
At the time of the 2006 National Census, the village's population, as Abkhur, was 46 in 19 households. The following census in 2011 counted 147 people in 55 households. The 2016 census measured the population of the village as 125 people in 46 households, by which time the village was listed as Abkhuri.
