= Aftar =

Village in Semnan province, Iran

Aftar Persian: افتر
- Village
- Location within Iran
- Coordinates: 35°36′11″N 53°06′40″E
- Country: Iran
- Province: Semnan
- County: Sorkheh
- District: Hafdar
- Rural District: Hafdar

Population (2016)
  - Total: 1,222
- Time zone: UTC+3:30 (IRST)

Aftar (Persian: افتر) is a village in, and the capital of, Hafdar Rural District in Hafdar District of Sorkheh County, Semnan province, Iran.

== Demographics ==
=== Population ===
At the time of the 2006 National Census, the village's population was 914 in 220 households, when it was in Sorkheh District (Note: Renamed the Central District of Sorkheh County) of Semnan County. The following census in 2011 counted 734 people in 218 households. The 2016 census measured the population of the village as 1,222 people in 410 households, by which time the district had been separated from the county in the establishment of Sorkheh County.

In 2021, the district was renamed the Central District and the rural district was separated from it in the formation of Hafdar District.
