= Dowzahir =

Village in Semnan province, Iran

Dowzahir Persian: دوزهير
- Village
- Location within Iran
- Coordinates: 35°38′10″N 53°53′49″E
- Country: Iran
- Province: Semnan
- County: Semnan
- District: Central
- Rural District: Howmeh

Population (2016)
  - Total: 108
- Time zone: UTC+3:30 (IRST)

Dowzahir (Persian: دوزهير) (Note: Also romanized as Dowzahīr and Dūzahīr; also known as Dozair) is a village in Howmeh Rural District of the Central District in Semnan County, Semnan province, Iran.

== Demographics ==
=== Population ===
At the time of the 2006 National Census, the village's population was 102 in 47 households. The following census in 2011 counted 93 people in 40 households. The 2016 census measured the population of the village as 108 people in 47 households.
