= Shahrak-e Afaghaneh =

Village in Semnan province, Iran

Shahrak-e Afaghaneh Persian: شهرك افاغنه
- Village
- Country: Iran
- Province: Semnan
- County: Semnan
- District: Central
- Rural District: Howmeh

Population (2016)
  - Total: 3,291
- Time zone: UTC+3:30 (IRST)

Shahrak-e Afaghaneh (Persian: شهرك افاغنه) (Note: Also romanized as Shahraḵ-e Afāghaneh) is a village in Howmeh Rural District of the Central District in Semnan County, Semnan province, Iran.

== Demographics ==
=== Population ===
At the time of the 2006 National Census, the village's population was 2,565 in 471 households. The following census in 2011 counted 3,415 people in 812 households. The 2016 census measured the population of the village as 3,291 people in 630 households.
