= Sangsari language =

Semnani language spoken in northern Iran

Sangsari
- سنگسری, Sangesari
- Native to: Semnan, Mazanderan, Tehran, Golestan & Markazi provinces of Iran
- Region: Elburz
- Ethnicity: Semnani
- Native speakers: 43,000 (2021)
- Language family: Indo-European: Indo-Iranian; Iranian; Western Iranian; Northwestern; Semnani; Sangsari
- Writing system: Persian alphabet

Language codes
- ISO 639-3: sgr
- Glottolog: sang1315
- ELP: Sangisari

Sangsari or Sangisari is an Iranian language spoken mainly in the Semnan and Tehran provinces of Iran, especially in the town of Sangesar (Mahdi Shehr) and in several surrounding villages. There are around 50,000 Sangsari speakers.

== Classification ==
Ethnologue classifies Sangsari in the Semnani group of Northwestern Iranian languages that also includes Lasgerdi, Semnani, and Sorkhei. Glottolog classifies the Sangsari language within the Komisenian subgroup of the Northwest Iranian branch of the Iranian languages. Glottolog's classification has also been adopted by Wiktionary. Whereas the Komisenian languages consist of Sangsari, Lasgerdi, Sorkhei and Aftari languages the Semnani languages consist of Semnani and Biyabuneki. Sangsari is also, linguistically, close to Zaza, spoken in Anatolia. Jost Gippert classifies Sangsari, Zaza and Balochi together within the Hyrcanian subgroup.

== Phonology ==
The vowels of Sangsari are /a, aː, e, eː, i, o, oː, u, uː/. The consonants are the same as in Persian.

== Grammar ==
Sangisari, similar to Semnani, Zaza and Tati, has a two-gender, case and ergative system. It distinguishes two numbers in pronouns, singular and plural, and marks two cases, the direct (nominative) and the oblique and distinguishes between masculine and feminine in the third person singular for both the direct and oblique case. Distinguishing them from all other Western Iranian languages, the typological feature of grammatical gender marking within the copula is exhibited by Sangsari, alongside Semnani, Momenabadi, Zaza, and Tati.

=== Pronouns ===
English	Sangsari	Semnani	Zaza	Tati (Note: Hazārrūdi)	Tati (Note: Alviri-Vidari)	Tati (Note: Eštehārdi)	Tati (Note: Cālī)	Tati (Note: Khalkhali)
i	a	a	ez	az	az	az	az	az
you	tö	tö	tı	ta	ta	tö	ta	tə
he	nö	u	o	o	u	a	a	av
she	nā	una	a	oa	ua	ā	aya	ava
we	ham	hamā	mā	amā	ǰema	čama	amā	âmâ
you	xā	šemā	šımā	šomā	šemā	šəma	šömā	šâmâ
they	anun	uni	ê/inā	o	unehā	āhā	ay	avə

== See also ==
- Wiktionary: Swadesh list of Sangisari words
