= Ala, Iran =

Village in Semnan province, Iran

Ala Persian: علا
- Village
- Location within Iran
- Coordinates: 35°32′39″N 53°29′31″E
- Country: Iran
- Province: Semnan
- County: Semnan
- District: Central
- Rural District: Howmeh

Population (2016)
  - Total: 955
- Time zone: UTC+3:30 (IRST)

Ala (Persian: علا) (Note: Also romanized as ‘Alā, ‘Alā’, and ‘Allā; also known as Kalāt) is a village in, and the capital of, Howmeh Rural District in the Central District of Semnan County, Semnan province, Iran.

== Demographics ==
=== Population ===
At the time of the 2006 National Census, the village's population was 1,303 in 349 households. The following census in 2011 counted 977 people in 283 households. The 2016 census measured the population of the village as 955 people in 289 households.
