= Kendu, Iran =

Village in Semnan province, Iran

Kendu Persian: كندو
- Village
- Location within Iran
- Coordinates: 35°32′17″N 53°29′29″E
- Country: Iran
- Province: Semnan
- County: Semnan
- District: Central
- Rural District: Howmeh

Population (2016)
  - Total: 82
- Time zone: UTC+3:30 (IRST)

Kendu (Persian: كندو) (Note: Also romanized as Kendū; also known as Yusefabad (يوسف اباد), also romanized as Yūsefābād) is a village in Howmeh Rural District of the Central District in Semnan County, Semnan province, Iran.

== Demographics ==
=== Population ===
The village did not appear in the 2006 National Census. The following census in 2011 counted 114 people in 36 households. The 2016 census measured the population of the village as 82 people in 33 households.
