= Lasjerd =

Village in Semnan province, Iran

Lasjerd Persian: لاسجرد
- Village
- Location within Iran
- Coordinates: 35°24′23″N 53°05′07″E
- Country: Iran
- Province: Semnan
- County: Sorkheh
- District: Central
- Rural District: Lasgerd

Population (2016)
  - Total: 1,024
- Time zone: UTC+3:30 (IRST)

Lasjerd (Persian: لاسجرد) (Note: Also romanized as Lāsjerd; also known as Lāsgerd, Lāsgird, and Lāsjird) is a village in Lasgerd Rural District of the Central District (Note: Formerly Sorkheh District of Semnan County) in Sorkheh County, Semnan province, Iran, serving as capital of both the district and the rural district. The previous capital of the district was the city of Sorkheh.

== Demographics ==
=== Population ===
At the time of the 2006 National Census, the village's population was 1,069 in 318 households, when it was in Sorkheh District (Note: Renamed the Central District of Sorkheh County) of Semnan County. The following census in 2011 counted 1,019 people in 326 households. The 2016 census measured the population of the village as 1,024 people in 382 households, by which time the district had been separated from the county in the establishment of Sorkheh County. Lasjerd was the most populous village in its rural district.

The district was renamed the Central District in 2021.
