= Hasanabad, Semnan =

Village in Semnan province, Iran

Hasanabad Persian: حسن آباد
- Village
- Location within Iran
- Coordinates: 35°30′41″N 53°23′15″E
- Country: Iran
- Province: Semnan
- County: Semnan
- District: Central
- Rural District: Howmeh

Population (2016)
  - Total: 124
- Time zone: UTC+3:30 (IRST)

Hasanabad (Persian: حسن آباد) (Note: Also romanized as Ḩasanābād) is a village in Howmeh Rural District of the Central District in Semnan County, Semnan province, Iran.

== Demographics ==
=== Population ===
At the time of the 2006 National Census, the village's population was 143 in 39 households. The following census in 2011 counted 61 people in 19 households. The 2016 census measured the population of the village as 124 people in 43 households.
