= Delazian =

Village in Semnan province, Iran

Delazian Persian: دلازيان
- Village
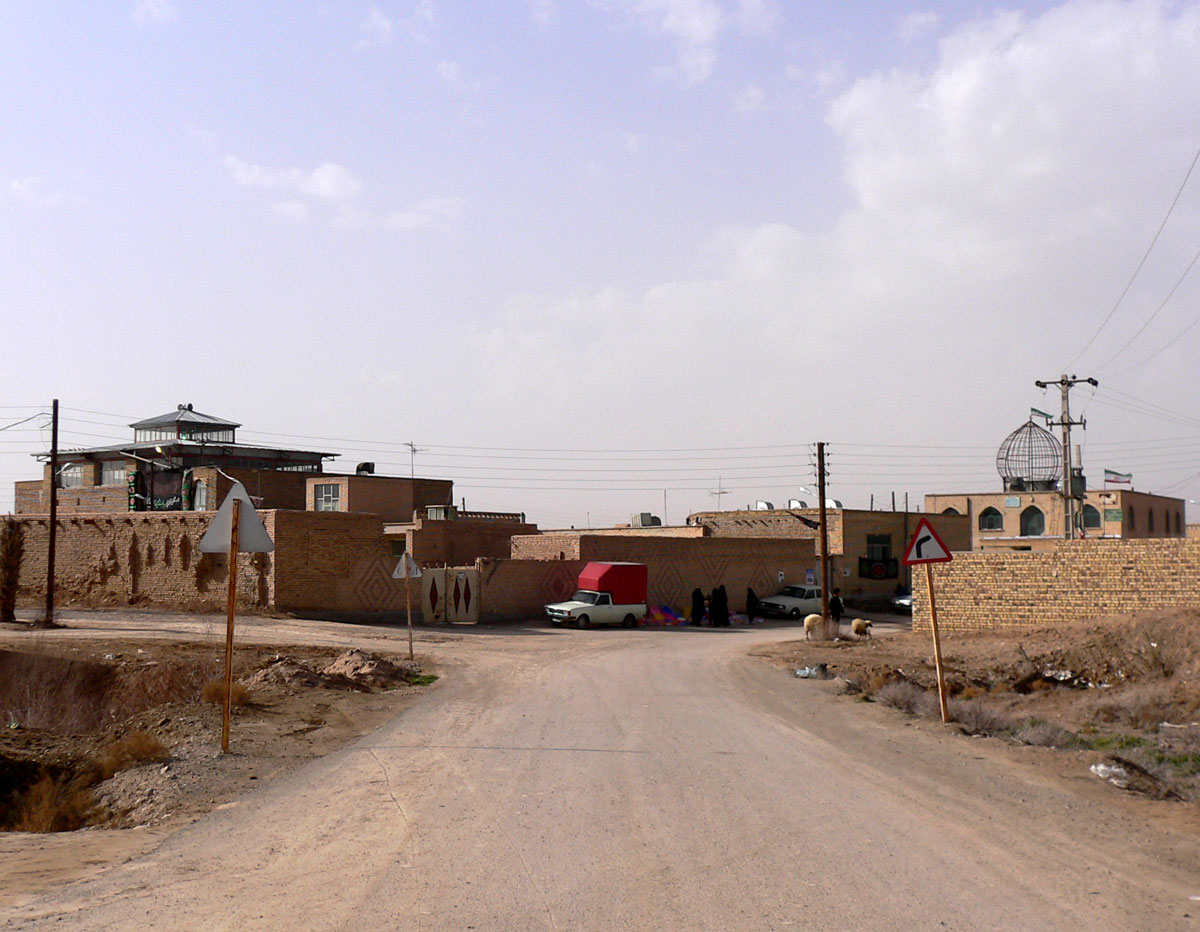
- The village of Delazian

- Location within Iran
- Coordinates: 35°29′52″N 53°24′27″E
- Country: Iran
- Province: Semnan
- County: Semnan
- District: Central
- Rural District: Howmeh

Population (2016)
  - Total: 77
- Time zone: UTC+3:30 (IRST)

Delazian (Persian: دلازيان) (Note: Also romanized as Delāzeyān, Delāzīān, Delāzīyān; also known as Dalījān and Deliāzān) is a village in Howmeh Rural District of the Central District in Semnan County, Semnan province, Iran.

The archaeological mound site of Delazian is near the village. This site was surveyed and documented by Mohammad Mehryar and Ahmad Kabiri in the 1980s. It contains occupational remains dating back to the 2nd and 1st millennia BC. The discovery of the pointed barrel vault was the most important architectural find at this important site.

== Demographics ==
=== Population ===
At the time of the 2006 National Census, the village's population was 120 in 44 households. The following census in 2011 counted 68 people in 31 households. The 2016 census measured the population of the village as 77 people in 31 households.
