= Mahmudabad, Semnan =

Village in Semnan province, Iran

Mahmudabad Persian: محمود آباد
- Village
- Location within Iran
- Coordinates: 35°30′37″N 53°25′02″E
- Country: Iran
- Province: Semnan
- County: Semnan
- District: Central
- Rural District: Howmeh

Population (2016)
  - Total: 104
- Time zone: UTC+3:30 (IRST)

Mahmudabad (Persian: محمود آباد) (Note: Also romanized as Maḩmūdābād) is a village in Howmeh Rural District of the Central District in Semnan County, Semnan province, Iran.

== Demographics ==
=== Population ===
At the time of the 2006 National Census, the village's population was 70 in 19 households. The following census in 2011 counted 77 people in 25 households. The 2016 census measured the population of the village as 104 people in 37 households.
