= Sorkhei language =

Iranian language spoken in Iran

Sorkhei
- Sorkhei-Aftari
- Region: Iran
- Native speakers: 12,000 (2021)
- Language family: Indo-European: Indo-Iranian; Iranian; Western Iranian; Northwestern Iranian; Komisenian; Sorkhei-Aftari; Sorkhei
- Dialects: Sorkhei; Aftari

Language codes
- ISO 639-3: sqo
- Glottolog: sork1239
- ELP: Sorkhei

Sorkhei, or Sorkhei-Aftari, is a Northwestern Iranian language. It is one of the Komisenian languages. It is spoken in the villages of Sorkheh and Aftar in Semnan province in northwestern Iran.

== Classification ==
Sorkhei is a Northwestern Iranian language and belongs to the Komisenian subgroup. It is linguistically close to Sangsari and Lasgerdi. Sorkhei also shares similar structures with Zaza, which is linguistically close to Semnani.

== History ==
During the Iran-Iraq War, radio operators from Sorkheh used the language as a form of cryptography for tactical communications of the Iranian Armed Forces.

During the Iran nuclear negotiations, the language was used in conversations between Iranian President Hassan Rouhani and Hossein Fereydoun, his brother and aide traveling with the negotiating team. This was done to eliminate or reduce comprehensibility of the conversation by any potential eavesdroppers.

== Bibliography ==
- Pierre Lecoq. 1989. "Les dialectes caspiens et les dialectes du nord-ouest de l'Iran," Compendium Linguarum Iranicarum. Ed. Rüdiger Schmitt. Wiesbaden: Dr. Ludwig Reichert Verlag. Pages 296–314.
- Habib Borjian. 2008. "The Komisenian Dialect of Aftar", Archiv Orientální 76: 379–416.
