= Aftari dialect =

Dialect of Sorkhei spoken in Northern Iran

Aftari
- افتری
- Native to: Iran
- Region: Semnan province of Iran
- Language family: Indo-European: Indo-Iranian; Iranian; Western; Northwestern; Komisenian; Sorkhei-Aftari; Aftari
- Writing system: Arabic script

Language codes
- ISO 639-3: –
- Glottolog: afta1234
- ELP: Aftari

Aftari is a dialect of Sorkhei and is one of the local languages of Semnan province, belonging to the Komisenian group of the Northwestern Iranian branch of the Iranian languages. The language is spoken in the village of Aftar in Semnan Province and derives its name from Aftar.

== Grammar ==
Aftari demonstrates a high degree of diachronic conservation regarding Northwestern Iranian phonology. Morphologically, Aftari forms its present stem from the Old Iranian present participle /*-ant/, which links it to Zaza, Tati, Talysh, Gilaki and Mazanderani.

=== Pronouns ===
The Aftari pronoun paradigm is as follows: a = I, tu = you, ū = he/she, hēm = we, hūy = you (pl.), and yūn = they.

== Bibliography ==
- Borjian, Habib (2008). "The Komisenian Dialect of Aftar". Oriental Archive. 76 (3).
