= Javin =

Javin may refer to:

- Javin, Iran
- Javin DeLaurier (born 1998), American basketball player
- Javin Gordon (born 2007), American football player
- Javin Hunter, American footballer
- Javin Wright (born 2000), American football player
- A misspell of Yavin, fictional planet system

== See also ==
- Javine (disambiguation)
