= Ali Asqar Peyvandi =

Ali Asghar Payvandi
- علی‌اصغر پیوندی
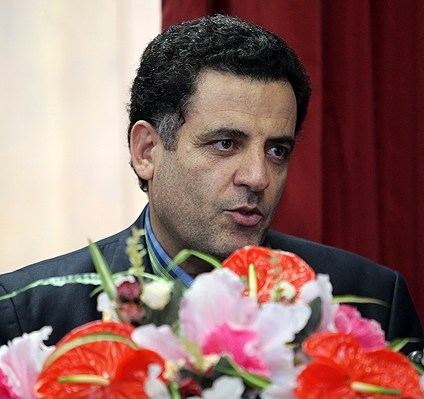

Iranian Red Crescent Society
- In office 2017–2019
- President: Hassan Rouhani
- Succeeded by: Karim Hemmati

Medical Council of the Islamic Republic of Iran

Personal details
- Born: 1962 (age 63–64) Sorkheh, Semnan
- Education: Shiraz University of Medical Science
- Occupation: Politician

Ali Asghar Peyvandi (Persian: علی‌اصغر پیوندی; born in 1962) is an Iranian physician, politician and university professor. He was the head of the Iranian Red Crescent Society between 2017 and 2019 when he was forced to resign before being arrested on charges of embezzlement.

== Education ==
Peyvandi received his general medical degree from Shiraz University of Medical Science in 1989 and also Otorhinolaryngology degree from the same university in 1993. He also took an additional surgery course in 2001 at University of Graz.
