= Kavir Buzurg =

- Salt marsh
- Coordinates: 34°38′39″N 52°26′29″E
- Location: Great Salt Desert

Kavir Buzurg, meaning Great Kavir, is a substantial stretch of salt marshes in the center of the Great Salt Desert (Dasht-e Kavir), a major desert in the middle of the Iranian plateau. The Kavir Buzurg covers an area of about 320 km (200 mi) by 160 km (99 mi). It is separated from the neighboring kavirs by a surrounding ring of sandy hills. This is located in a rain shadow desert that receives little moisture. When water evaporates from the salt marshes, it creates crusts of salt that covers a dark saline mush. These crusts are easily penetrated by a traveler, making journeying across the kavir dangerous. This region is nearly uninhabited, with humans primarily dwelling on the surrounding hills and mountains.
