= Howmeh Rural District (Semnan County) =

Rural district in Semnan province, Iran

Howmeh Rural District Persian: دهستان حومه
- Rural District
- Location within Iran
- Coordinates: 35°07′N 53°49′E
- Country: Iran
- Province: Semnan
- County: Semnan
- District: Central
- Capital: Ala

Population (2016)
  - Total: 11,392
- Time zone: UTC+3:30 (IRST)

Howmeh Rural District (Persian: دهستان حومه) is in the Central District of Semnan County, Semnan province, Iran. Its capital is the village of Ala.

== Demographics ==
=== Population ===
At the time of the 2006 National Census, the rural district's population was 10,873 in 2,803 households. There were 13,727 inhabitants in 3,207 households at the following census of 2011. The 2016 census measured the population of the rural district as 11,392 in 2,887 households. The most populous of its 234 villages was Kheyrabad, with 3,325 people.

=== Other villages in the rural district ===
- Abkhuri
- Delazian
- Dowzahir
- Hasanabad
- Jam
- Kendu
- Mahmudabad
- Roknabad
- Shahrak-e Afaghaneh
