= Hafdar Rural District =

Rural district in Semnan province, Iran

Hafdar Rural District Persian: دهستان هفدر
- Rural District
- Location within Iran
- Coordinates: 35°36′N 53°07′E
- Country: Iran
- Province: Semnan
- County: Sorkheh
- District: Hafdar
- Established: 1987
- Capital: Aftar

Population (2016)
  - Total: 3,599
- Time zone: UTC+3:30 (IRST)

Hafdar Rural District (Persian: دهستان هفدر) is in Hafdar District of Sorkheh County, Semnan province, Iran. Its capital is the village of Aftar.

== Demographics ==
=== Population ===
At the time of the 2006 National Census, the rural district's population (as a part of Sorkheh District (Note: Renamed the Central District of Sorkheh County) in Semnan County) was 2,997 in 816 households. There were 2,985 inhabitants in 895 households at the following census of 2011. The 2016 census measured the population of the rural district as 3,599 in 1,202 households, by which time the district had been separated from the county in the establishment of Sorkheh County. The most populous of its 48 villages was Mowmenabad (now in Momenabad Rural District), with 1,796 people

In 2021, the district was renamed the Central District and the rural district was separated from it in the formation of Hafdar District.

=== Other villages in the rural district ===
- Arvaneh
