= Hafdar District =

District in Semnan province, Iran

Hafdar District Persian: بخش هفدر
- District
- Location within Iran
- Coordinates: 35°35′N 53°04′E
- Country: Iran
- Province: Semnan
- County: Sorkheh
- Established: 2021
- Capital: Mowmenabad
- Time zone: UTC+3:30 (IRST)

Hafdar District (Persian: بخش هفدر) is in Sorkheh County, Semnan province, Iran. Its capital is the village of Mowmenabad, whose population at the time of the 2016 National Census was 1,796 in 585 households.

== History ==
In 2012, Sorkheh District (Note: Renamed the Central District of Sorkheh County) was separated from Semnan County in the establishment of Sorkheh County, which was divided into one district of two rural districts, with Sorkheh as its capital and only city at the time. In 2021, the district was renamed the Central District and Hafdar Rural District was separated from it in the formation of Hafdar District.

== Demographics ==
=== Administrative divisions ===
Hafdar District
Administrative Divisions
Hafdar RD
Momenabad RD
RD = Rural District
