= Javine =

Javine may refer to:

- Javine Hylton (born 1981), British singer
- Javinė, household god in Lithuanian mythology

== See also ==
- Javin (disambiguation)
