= Semnani people =

Total population
- c. 300,000

Regions with significant populations
- Northern Iran

Languages
- Semnani (indigenous), Persian (national)

Religion
- Shi'a Islam

Related ethnic groups
- Iranian peoples, Caspians

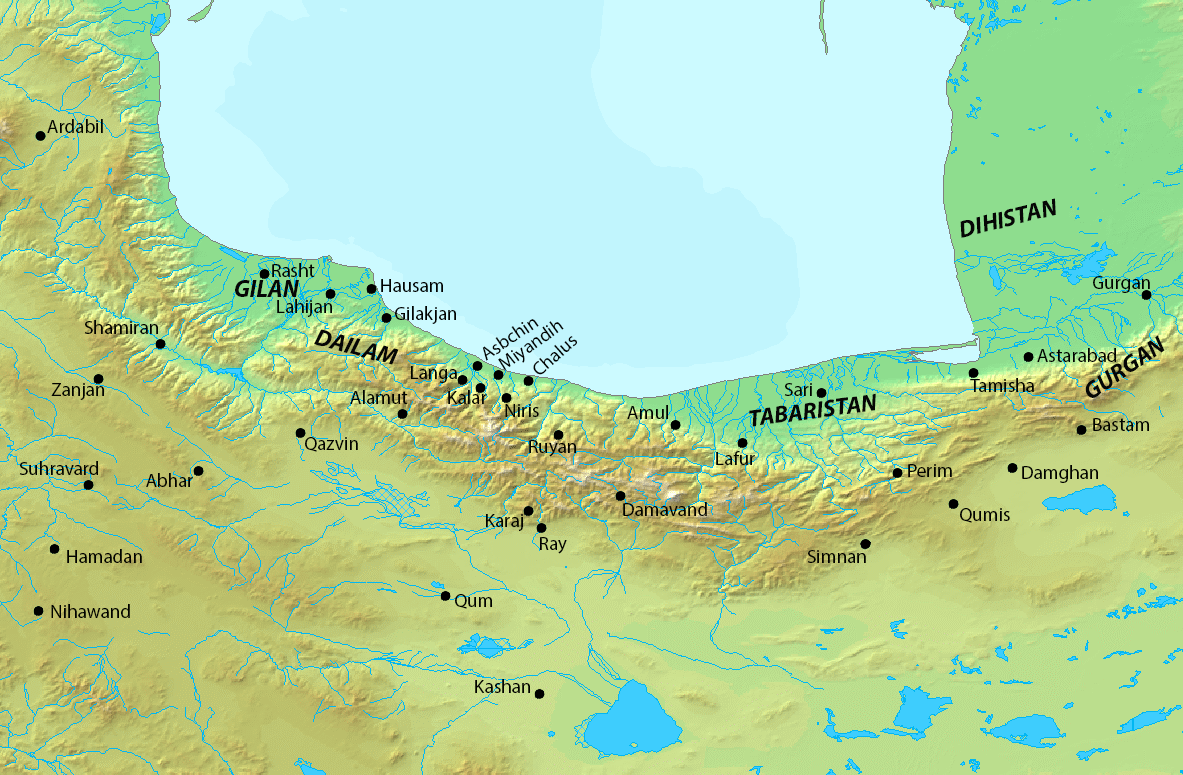
Map of northern Iran

The Semnani people (Semnani: سمنی مرتمونی, samani mertimüni) are a Caspian and Iranian people who primarily live in northern Iran and speak the Semnani languages. Today, the majority of Semnani people speak Persian.

== Origins ==
The Semnani people are Caspians who migrated to the northern fringe of the central Iranian plateau from the southern shores of the Caspian Sea. It is not known when this migration occurred, but these Caspian-speaking tribes slowly intermixed with the tribes of the plateau, creating what has been dubbed in Persian literature as an "Isle of Dialects."

These same Caspian migrants also settled in the villages and towns of Biyabunak, Eyvanakey, Sorkheh, Garmsar, Shahmirzad, Darjezin, and Mehdishahr. The city of Semnan is the primary hub of the Semnani people, though it is unclear whether the name itself came from the people or the settlement.

== Cultural identity ==
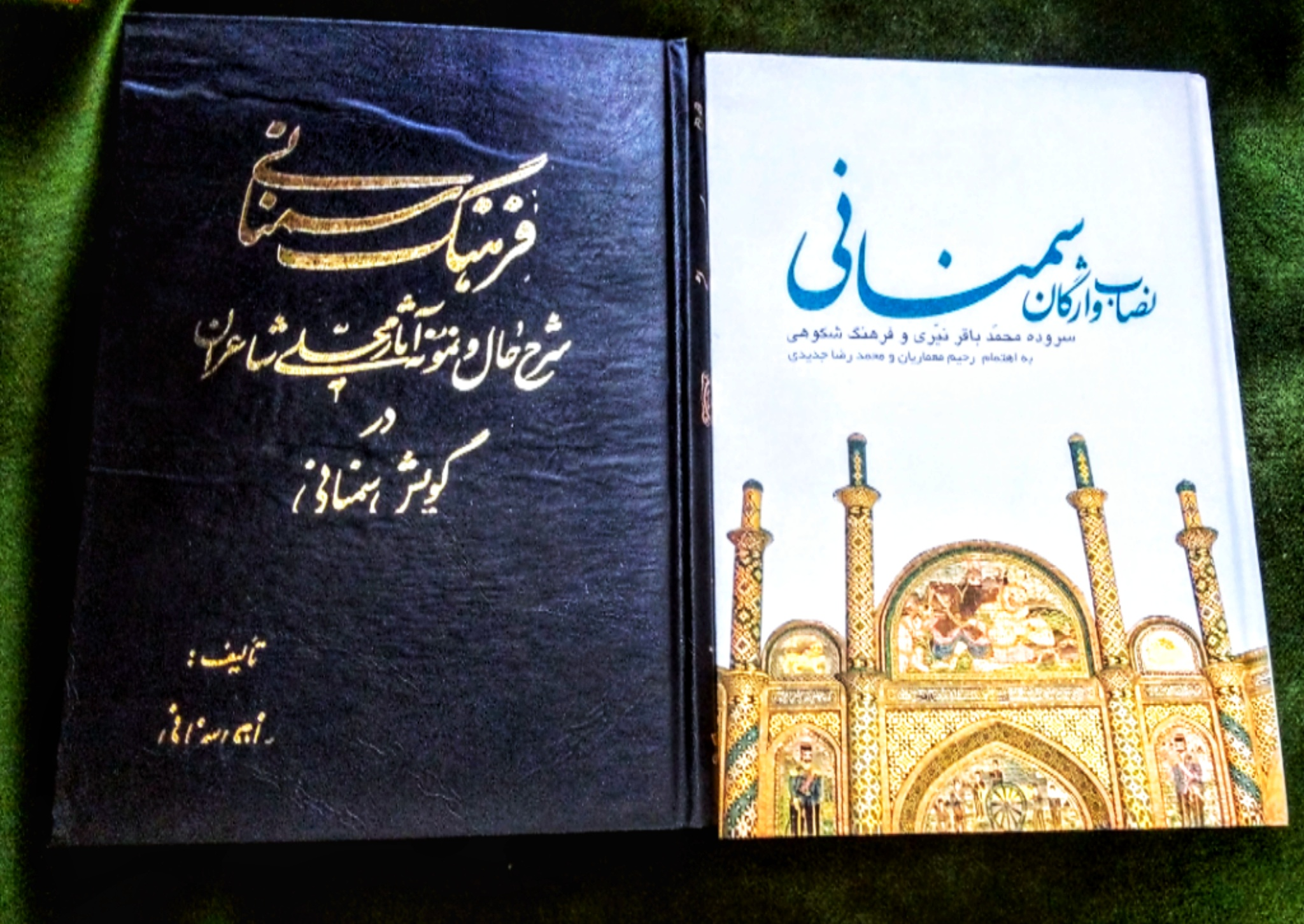
Semnani books of poetry and vocabulary compilations

Like many cultures of the Middle East, Semnani people emphasize kindness, compassion, and hospitality. The identity of the Semnani people is deeply intertwined with their language. The ardent desire to preserve their unique identity manifests throughout Semnani poetry.

سمنی زفون هما تاریخه
سمنی زفون هما فرهنگی میراثه
دیره سالون پی بمونچی گنجی واری تا اسه
مگی ژو نی یادارین و بسپارین

Semnani is our history
Semnani is our cultural heritage
Since ancient times 'til now, it has been a treasure intact
It is our duty to preserve it
-Parviz Pezhum Shariati

The spread of Persian—and even English—has threatened the preservation of the Semnani language. Poets, like Azim Hajj Ramazani, offer both hope and warning to the Semnani people.

زفونی دار هنی سوز ا زند، ای دد
نارزین ان دار بخشک تا پی هشتای دد

O Brother! The Tree of our Language is still alive and green.
O Brother! Do not let this Tree dry and die whilst it still stands.

== Agriculture ==
The arid plains of Iran's central desert sharply contrast with the lush, forested north of Iran, but the lack of rain did not stop the Semnani people from settling the alluvial fans and bringing the desert to life for the last thousand years.

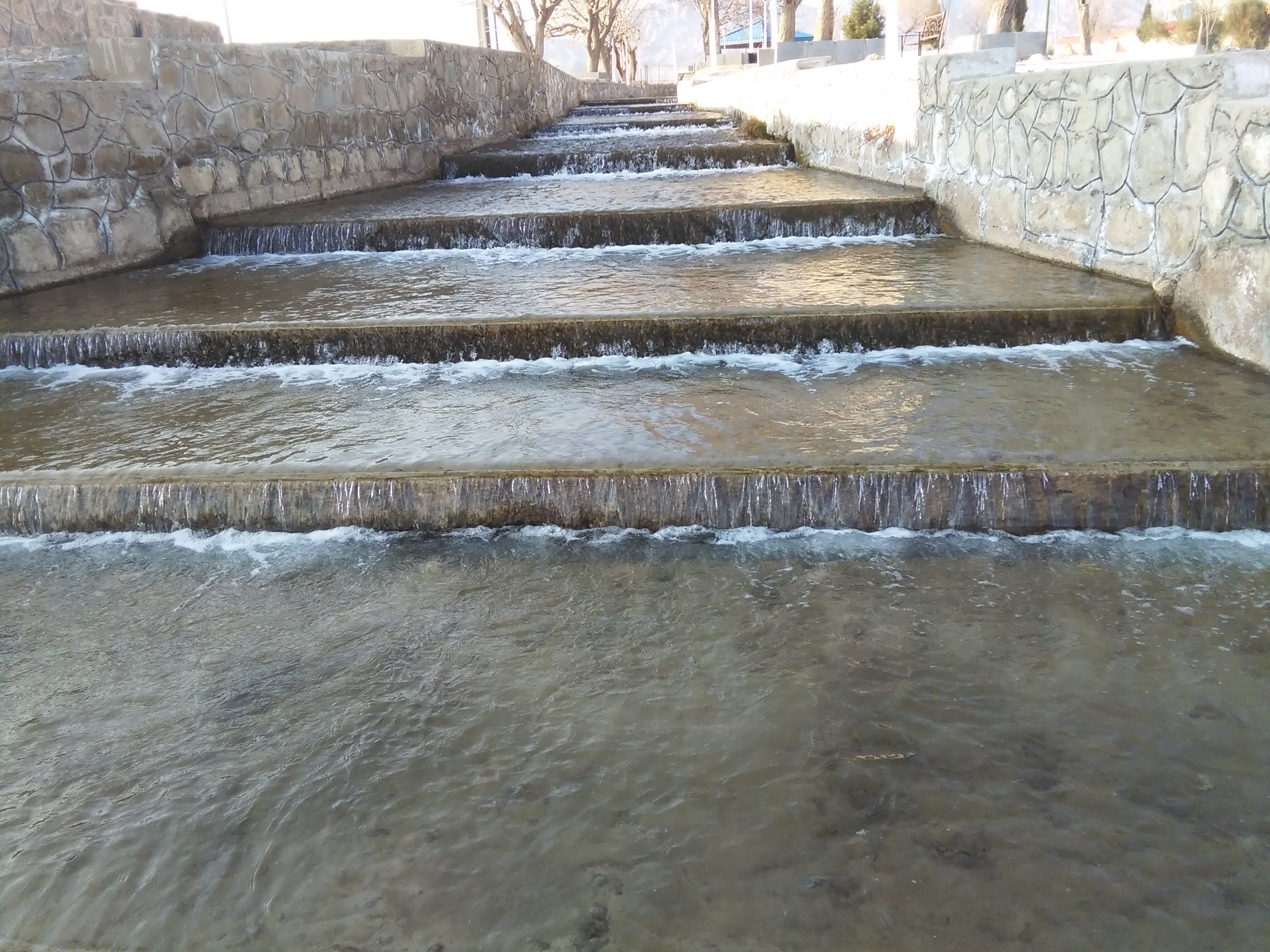
Parö System; speed control

The Semnani people built complex water irrigation projects to siphon snowmelt and runoff from the mountains. One such project is Parö, which in Semnani means the water splitter. A large channel made of stonemasonry would draw the rushing water into the city. Several large steps and ponds would reduce the speed of the runoff until the water becomes nearly stationary by the last step. From there, the water would be divided into as many channels as needed and dispatched via a system of overland and subterranean aqueducts. In pre-modern times, an engarnevis would oversee the water distribution process, keeping records of how much water has been dispatched to a particular neighborhood or agricultural district.
