= Rig-e Jenn =

Area of sand dunes in Iran believed to be inhabited by Jinn

Rig-e Jenn Desert of Spirits
- Dune
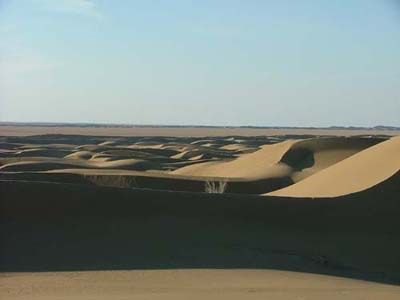
- A view of the sand dunes of the Rig-e Jenn

- Coordinates: 34.6295°N 53.3762°E
- Location: Dasht-e Kavir

The Rig-e Jenn (Persian: ریگ جن, lit. 'Dune of the Jinn'), or Desert of Spirits, is an area of sand dunes straddling Semnan province and Isfahan province in Iran's Great Salt Desert.

According to desert folklore, the dunes are inhabited by malevolent spirits and demons. It is believed that those who venture into the dunes are destined to never return.
