= Semnani language =

Language of the Semnan Province of Iran

Semnani
- سمنی زفون; Semani zefön
- Region: Iran
- Ethnicity: Semnani
- Language family: Indo-European: Indo-Iranian; Iranian; Western Iranian; Northwestern; Semnani; Semnani
- Dialects: Biyabanaki

Language codes
- ISO 639-3: smy
- Glottolog: semn1249
- ELP: Semnani
- Semnani is classified as Definitely Endangered by the UNESCO; Atlas of the World's Languages in Danger

Map depicting areas where Semnani languages are spoken (alongside Caspian languages)

Semnani (سمنانی زفون, Semani zefön) is the main language of the Semnan province of Iran and has several branches. The language belongs to the Northwestern branch of the Western Iranian languages and is spoken in south of the Caspian Sea.

Semnani, similar to other Caspian languages, bears some resemblance to the Old Iranian Median language and was influenced by Parthian in a later process.

== Classification ==
Glottolog classifies the Semnani language within the Semnani-Biyabuneki subgroup of Northwestern Iranian languages and classifies nearby languages, such as Sangsari, Lasgerdi, Sorkhei and Aftari within another subgroup, the Komisenian subgroup.

Semnani is linguistically closely related to Zaza, spoken in Anatolia and Gurani, spoken by pockets in northeastern Iraq and northwestern Iran. Jost Gippert suggests that "that there is an inter-related connection among (northern) Zāzāki, Semnāni, and Gorāni based on the shared archaic features of the languages".

== Phonology ==
=== Consonants ===
	Labial	Dental	Alveolar	Postalveolar	Palatal	Velar	Uvular	Glottal
Nasal	m		n			(ŋ)		
Plosive	p b		t d			k ɡ	q	ʔ
Affricate				tʃ dʒ				
Fricative	f v	θ	s z	ʃ ʒ		x ɣ		h
Tap			ɾ					
Trill			(r)					
Approximant			l		j	w		

(Where symbols appear in pairs, the one to the right represents a voiced consonant. Allophones are in parentheses.)

== Grammar ==
Grammatical gender has been extensively preserved in Semnani, Sangsari, Zaza and various Tati dialects. Semnani along with Zaza and Tati dialects, is distinguished within Western Iranian by marking grammatical gender on verbs, representing a highly idiosyncratic typological feature. These languages preserve the morphological expressions of grammatical gender across direct and oblique cases, singular and plural numbers and the copula.

=== Syntax ===
Subjects in Semnani must have gender agreement with the verb in their immediate clause.

== Bibliography ==
Pierre Lecoq. 1989. "Les dialectes caspiens et les dialectes du nord-ouest de l'Iran," Compendium Linguarum Iranicarum. Ed. Rüdiger Schmitt. Wiesbaden: Dr. Ludwig Reichert Verlag. Pages 296–314.
