= Lasgerdi language =

Iranian language

Lasgerdi
- Region: Iran
- Ethnicity: Semnani
- Native speakers: 1,000 (2006 census)
- Language family: Indo-European: Indo-Iranian; Iranian; Western Iranian; Northwestern; Semnani; Lasgerdi
- Dialects: Biyabanaki ?

Language codes
- ISO 639-3: lsa
- Glottolog: lasg1238
- ELP: Lasgerdi

Lasgerdi is one of the local languages of Semnan Province in northwestern Iran. It is one of the Komisenian languages.
