= Semnani languages =

Group of North-western Iranian languages

Semnani
- Geographic distribution: Iran
- Linguistic classification: Indo-European: Indo-Iranian; Iranian; Western Iranian; Northwestern Iranian; Semnani
- Subdivisions: Aftari; Biyabunaki; Lasgerdi; Sangsari; Semnani; Sorkhei

Language codes
- Glottolog: semn1249 Semnani–Biyabuneki komi1276 Komisenian

The Semnani languages or Komisenian languages are a group of Northwestern Iranian languages, spoken in Semnan province of Iran that share many linguistic features and structures with most other Iranian languages, and are part of the Caspian languages. There are six Semnani languages named in the literature. Some may be dialects, but there is little published work on their relationships. Semnani (incl. one of several dialects termed 'Biyabunaki'), Sangsari, Sorkhei, Aftari and Lasgerdi.

== Grammar ==
=== Grammatical gender ===
Within the Semnani group, grammatical gender is a distinct feature attested in Semnani, Sangsari and Momenabadi, similar to Zaza and Tati. The morphosyntactic locus of gender agreement varies cross-linguistically, manifesting in nominal affixes, articles, third-person singular pronouns, and verbal inflection.

=== Numbers ===
Numbers in the Semnani languages and other closely related languages Zaza and Tati and their relationship with Avestan and Parthian are as follows:

	one	two	three	four	five	six	seven	eight	nine	ten	twenty
Avestan	aēva/aēvā (m./f.)	dva	hrī	čahwar	panca	hšvaš	hapta	ašta	nava	dasa	vīsati
Parthian	ēw	dō	hrē	čafār	panǰ	šwah	haft	hašt	nah	das	wist
Semnani	i/iya (m./f.)	do	heyra	čār	panǰ	šaš	haft	hašt	na	das	vist
Sorkhei	i	do	heré	čār	panǰ	šaš	haft	hašt	na	das	vist
Lasgerdi	i	do	heyré	čār	panǰ	šaš	haft	hašt	na	das	vist
Biyabunaki	i	dū	häirä	čāhār	pahānǰ	šāš	hāft	hāšt	nā	dās	vist
Zaza	žew/žû (m./f.)	di	hīrē	čahār	panǰ	šaš	hawt	hašt	naw	das	vist
Tati	iv/iva (m./f.)	de	here	čö	pinǰ	šoš	hoft	hašt	növ	doh	vist
Harzandi	i	de	heri	čö	pinǰ	šaš	hoft	hašt	nov	da	vist
Kilit	ivi	dèv	he	čoy	pinǰ	šaš	haft	hašt	nav	dah	vist

== Cognate sets ==
English	Sorkhei	Lasgerdi	Sangsari	Aftari	Biyabunaki
horse	esbā	esbe	esbe	espa	esba
girl	dukkey	dot	döt	dut	dut
blood	xün				xün
large	masīn	masīn	mas/yale	masīn	
nose	ven	vinī	xunī	vinī	vēnī
snow	vār	var	varf		var
serpent			mohur		mahar
moon			mūng		māye
woman	žiki	žaki	žekeyn	džek	džinakā

== Bibliography ==
- Borjian, Habib (2008). "The Komisenian Dialect of Aftar". Archiv Orientální. 76: 379–416. doi:10.7916/D8N02H9X.
- Lecoq, Pierre (1989). "Les dialectes caspiens et les dialectes du nord-ouest de l'Iran". In Schmitt, Rüdiger (ed.). Compendium Linguarum Iranicarum. Wiesbaden: Dr. Ludwig Reichert Verlag. pp. 296–314.
