= Great Salt Desert =

Desert in central Iran

- Dasht-e Kavir
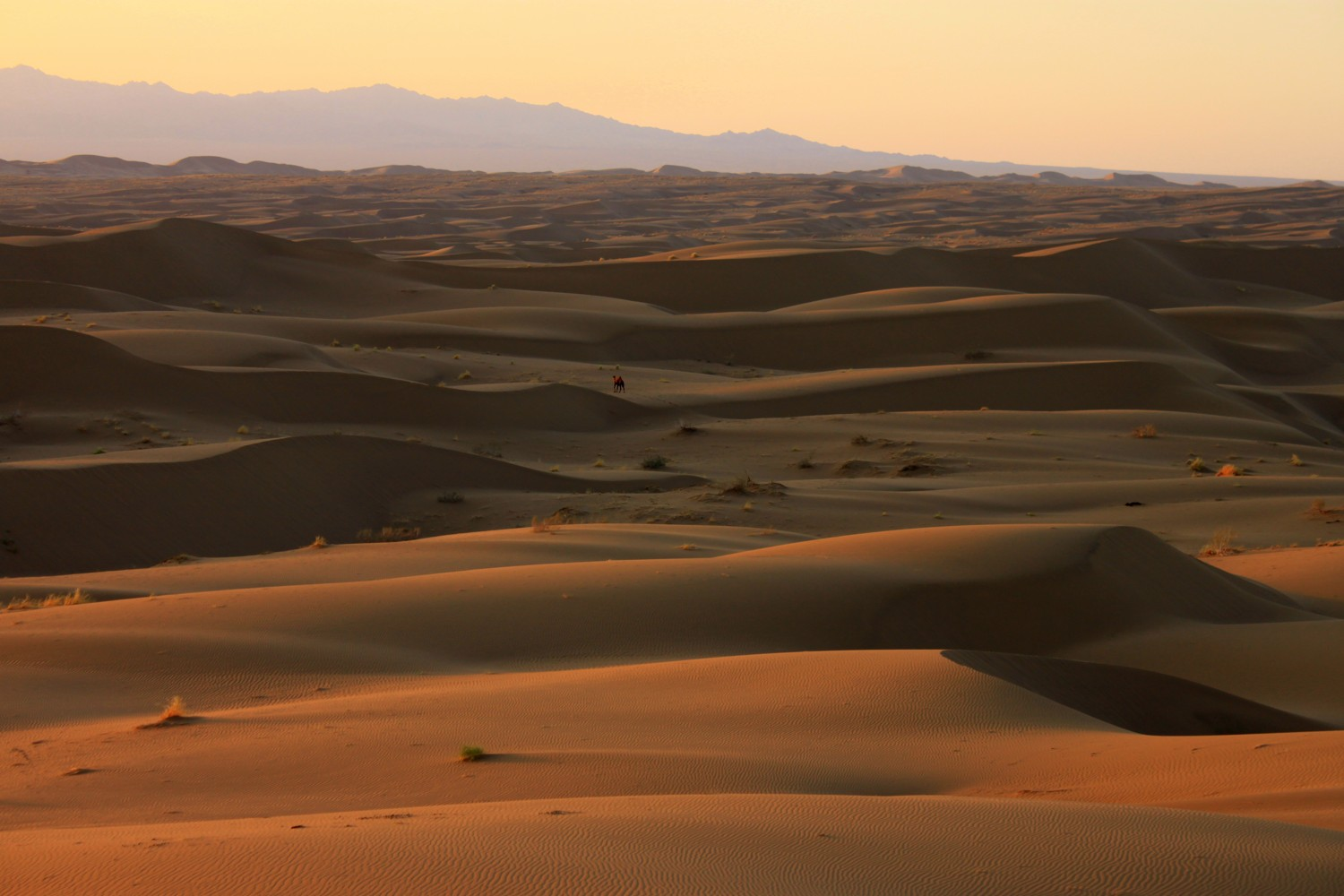
- Sand dunes in the Rig-e Jenn in the Kavir Desert

- Location within Iran
- Length: 800 km (500 mi)
- Width: 500 km (310 mi)
- Area: 77,600 km^{2} (30,000 mi^{2})

Geography
- Country: Iran
- Province: Khorasan, Semnan, Tehran, Isfahan, Yazd
- Coordinates: 34°44′15.2″N 54°49′37.56″E
- Interactive map of Great Salt Desert

The Great Salt Desert or Kavir Desert (Persian: دشت کویر, romanized: Dasht-e Kavir, lit. 'Low Plains' in classical Persian, from khwar (low), and dasht (plain, flatland)) is a large desert lying in the middle of the Iranian Plateau. It is about 800 kilometres (500 mi) long by 320 kilometres (200 mi) wide with a total surface area of about 77,600 km^{2} (30,000 sq mi), making it the world's 24th largest desert. The desert stretches from the Alborz mountain range in the north-west to the Lut Desert in the south-east, both forming a natural barrier against migrations eastwards or westwards. It is spread across the Iranian provinces of Khorasan, Semnan, Tehran, Isfahan and Yazd.

== Features ==
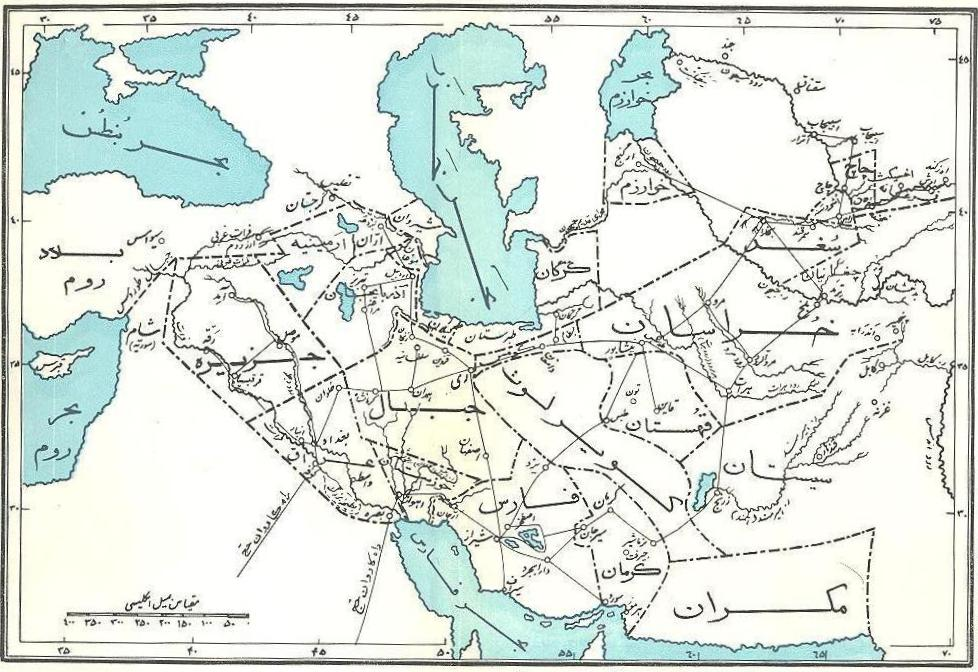
Map showing the Kavir Desert during the time of the Abbasid Caliphate as part of a continuum with the Lut Desert.

The Great Salt Desert forms part of a 4,000 km^{2} (1,500 sq mi) protected ecological zone, the Kavir National Park.

The Kavir Desert also contains the Rig-e Jenn, an area of sandy dunes traditionally associated with jinn and other evil spirits.

In the center of the desert lies the salt marshes of Kavir Buzurg (Great Kavir), which is about 320 km (200 mi) long and 160 km (99 mi) wide.

On the western edge of the desert lies the 1,800 km^{2} (690 sq mi) Namak Lake ("salt lake").

== Climate and structure ==
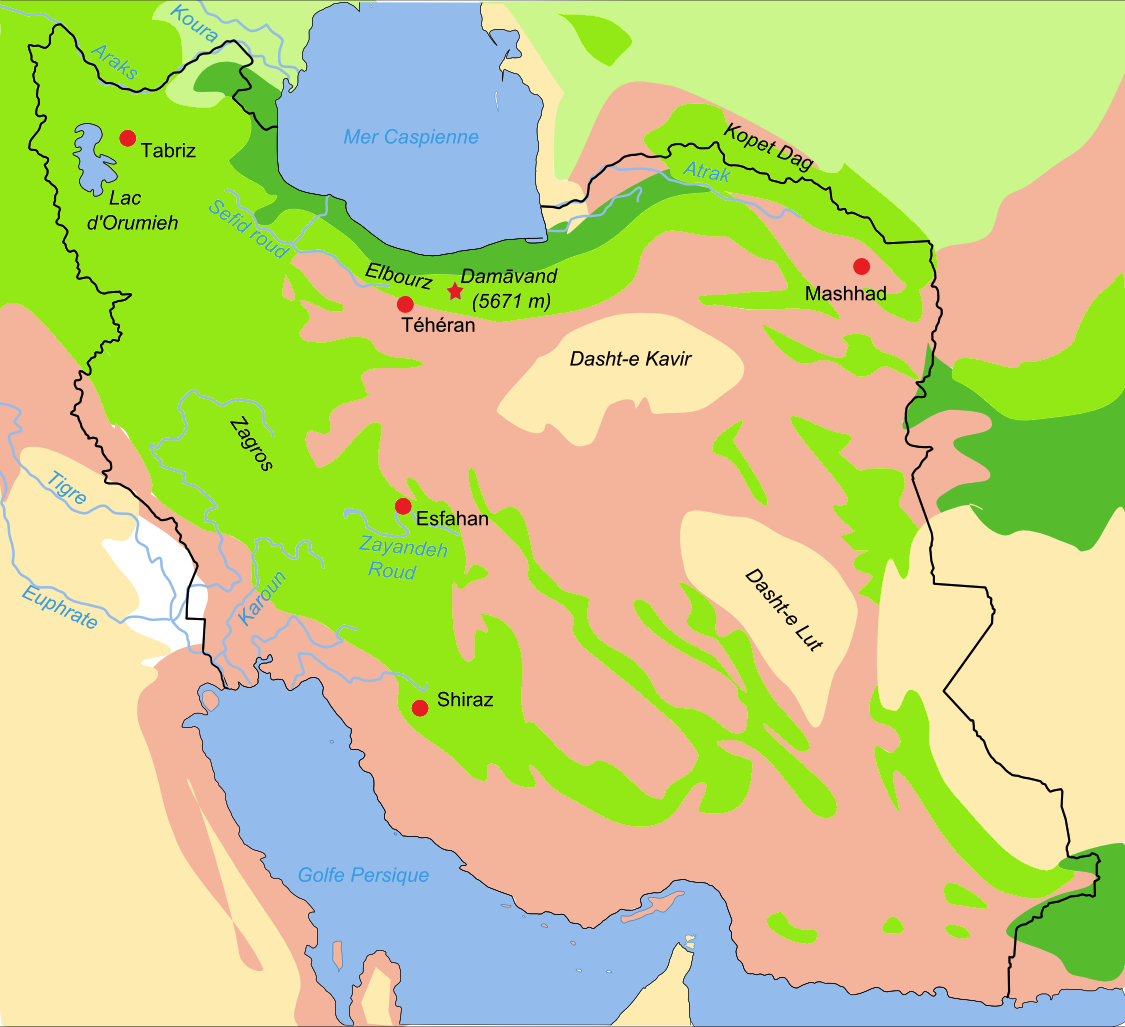
Map of biotopes of Iran, showing location of Dasht-e Kavir (beige oval at right center). Forest steppe Forests and woodlands Semi-desert Desert lowlands Steppe Salted alluvial marshes

Dasht-e Kavir has an arid climate with little precipitation. However, there is usually some rainfall in winter, as well as the mountains that surround it, provide plenty of runoff—enough to create vast seasonal lakes, marshlands and playas. Daytime and nighttime temperatures can vary by as much as 70 °C (130 °F) over the course of a year. The weather can get quite cold during the nighttime in winter, routinely dropping to below 0 °C (32 °F) in some areas.

The desert soil is covered with sand and pebbles; there are marshes, seasonal lakes and seasonal river beds. The high temperatures and low humidity cause extreme vaporization, which leaves the marshes and mud grounds with large crusts of salt.

Climate data for Garmsār, Semnan Province, Altitude: 899.9 M from: 1986-2010
Month	Jan	Feb	Mar	Apr	May	Jun	Jul	Aug	Sep	Oct	Nov	Dec	Year
Record high °C (°F)	20.8 (69.4)	24.6 (76.3)	32.2 (90.0)	36.6 (97.9)	40.8 (105.4)	45.0 (113.0)	47.0 (116.6)	46.0 (114.8)	41.0 (105.8)	36.4 (97.5)	28.4 (83.1)	22.2 (72.0)	47.0 (116.6)
Mean daily maximum °C (°F)	10.2 (50.4)	13.5 (56.3)	18.8 (65.8)	25.7 (78.3)	31.6 (88.9)	37.7 (99.9)	40.0 (104.0)	39.1 (102.4)	34.8 (94.6)	27.7 (81.9)	18.9 (66.0)	12.1 (53.8)	25.8 (78.5)
Daily mean °C (°F)	4.7 (40.5)	7.4 (45.3)	12.4 (54.3)	18.6 (65.5)	24.0 (75.2)	29.7 (85.5)	32.4 (90.3)	31.1 (88.0)	26.4 (79.5)	20.0 (68.0)	12.2 (54.0)	6.5 (43.7)	18.8 (65.8)
Mean daily minimum °C (°F)	−0.9 (30.4)	1.3 (34.3)	6.0 (42.8)	11.5 (52.7)	16.4 (61.5)	21.6 (70.9)	24.7 (76.5)	23.2 (73.8)	18.1 (64.6)	12.3 (54.1)	5.6 (42.1)	0.9 (33.6)	11.7 (53.1)
Average precipitation mm (inches)	15.0 (0.59)	14.5 (0.57)	26.9 (1.06)	19.8 (0.78)	10.8 (0.43)	1.0 (0.04)	2.7 (0.11)	1.0 (0.04)	0.4 (0.02)	3.8 (0.15)	11.1 (0.44)	14.1 (0.56)	121.1 (4.79)
Average relative humidity (%)	64	55	47	39	32	23	25	25	28	36	50	64	41

Climate data for Ardestan, Esfahan Province, Altitude: 1252.4 M from: 1992-2010
Month	Jan	Feb	Mar	Apr	May	Jun	Jul	Aug	Sep	Oct	Nov	Dec	Year
Record high °C (°F)	22.2 (72.0)	26.4 (79.5)	32.0 (89.6)	34.4 (93.9)	39.6 (103.3)	43.2 (109.8)	44.4 (111.9)	43.4 (110.1)	39.6 (103.3)	34.2 (93.6)	29.4 (84.9)	22.6 (72.7)	44.4 (111.9)
Mean daily maximum °C (°F)	9.1 (48.4)	13.3 (55.9)	18.4 (65.1)	24.8 (76.6)	30.2 (86.4)	35.8 (96.4)	38.2 (100.8)	37.3 (99.1)	33.0 (91.4)	26.4 (79.5)	17.6 (63.7)	11.2 (52.2)	24.6 (76.3)
Daily mean °C (°F)	4.6 (40.3)	8.1 (46.6)	12.9 (55.2)	19.0 (66.2)	24.0 (75.2)	29.4 (84.9)	31.9 (89.4)	30.8 (87.4)	26.7 (80.1)	20.7 (69.3)	12.7 (54.9)	6.8 (44.2)	19.0 (66.1)
Mean daily minimum °C (°F)	0.1 (32.2)	2.8 (37.0)	7.4 (45.3)	13.2 (55.8)	17.9 (64.2)	22.9 (73.2)	25.6 (78.1)	24.4 (75.9)	20.4 (68.7)	15.1 (59.2)	7.7 (45.9)	2.4 (36.3)	13.3 (56.0)
Record low °C (°F)	−15.2 (4.6)	−8.4 (16.9)	−5.2 (22.6)	1.2 (34.2)	5.8 (42.4)	13.0 (55.4)	18.2 (64.8)	15.8 (60.4)	10.5 (50.9)	6.6 (43.9)	−3.0 (26.6)	−10.2 (13.6)	−15.2 (4.6)
Average precipitation mm (inches)	24.1 (0.95)	15.1 (0.59)	23.1 (0.91)	15.5 (0.61)	13.3 (0.52)	0.9 (0.04)	0.4 (0.02)	0.9 (0.04)	0.5 (0.02)	2.0 (0.08)	8.9 (0.35)	22.4 (0.88)	127.1 (5.01)
Average snowy days	3.1	1.3	0.5	0.0	0.1	0.0	0.0	0.0	0.0	0.0	0.0	1.1	6.1
Average relative humidity (%)	52	41	33	29	24	19	19	17	18	26	38	51	31

Climate data for Biarjamand, Semnan Province, Altitude: 1099.3 M from: 1992-2010
Month	Jan	Feb	Mar	Apr	May	Jun	Jul	Aug	Sep	Oct	Nov	Dec	Year
Mean daily maximum °C (°F)	7.6 (45.7)	11.2 (52.2)	16.7 (62.1)	23.3 (73.9)	28.6 (83.5)	33.5 (92.3)	35.6 (96.1)	34.7 (94.5)	30.7 (87.3)	24.5 (76.1)	16.3 (61.3)	9.6 (49.3)	22.7 (72.9)
Daily mean °C (°F)	2.2 (36.0)	5.0 (41.0)	10.1 (50.2)	16.5 (61.7)	21.7 (71.1)	26.7 (80.1)	29.3 (84.7)	28.0 (82.4)	23.3 (73.9)	17.0 (62.6)	9.6 (49.3)	4.1 (39.4)	16.1 (61.0)
Mean daily minimum °C (°F)	−3.2 (26.2)	−1.1 (30.0)	3.4 (38.1)	9.7 (49.5)	14.9 (58.8)	20.0 (68.0)	22.9 (73.2)	21.4 (70.5)	16.0 (60.8)	9.4 (48.9)	2.9 (37.2)	−1.5 (29.3)	9.6 (49.2)
Average precipitation mm (inches)	15.4 (0.61)	13.2 (0.52)	28.2 (1.11)	23.7 (0.93)	15.4 (0.61)	4.3 (0.17)	0.6 (0.02)	1.3 (0.05)	2.0 (0.08)	3.1 (0.12)	7.2 (0.28)	13.1 (0.52)	127.5 (5.02)
Average relative humidity (%)	66	57	49	43	35	30	30	30	33	39	50	66	44

== Post-glacial lake system ==
Almost 3,000 years ago, at the start of the post-glacial era, the Kavir was a series of vast lakes.

== Wildlife ==
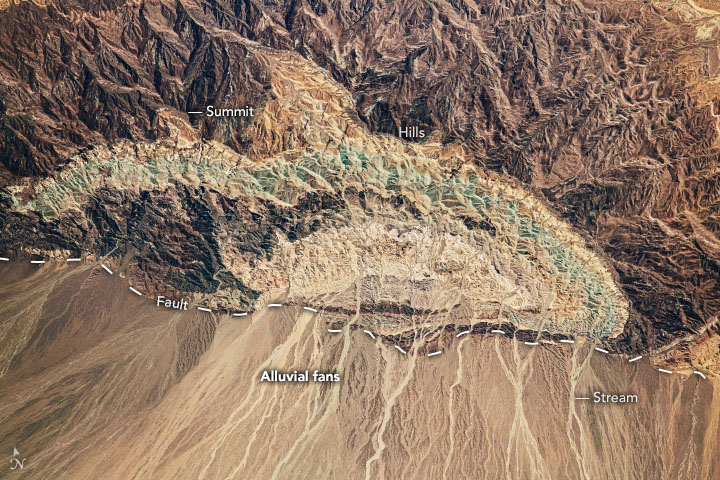
Half Mountain, Dasht-e Kavir Desert. This small mountain is fault-bounded at its south edge. The alluvium is about 900 meters (2,900 feet) lower than the summit (labelled). Image is about 17 kilometers (10 miles) wide.

Vegetation in the Dasht-e Kavir is adapted to the hot and arid climate as well as to the saline soil in which it is rooted.

Goitered gazelles live in parts of steppe and desert areas of the central plateau. Mouflon, dromedaries, wild goats and Persian leopards are common in mountainous areas. Night life brings on Arabian wildcats, Indian wolves, foxes, and other carnivores.

== Cultivation ==
The extreme heat and many storms in Dasht-e Kavir cause extensive erosion, which makes it almost impossible to cultivate the lands. The desert is almost uninhabited and knows little exploitation.

== See also ==
- Dasht-e Lut – Desert in Iran ('Desert of Emptiness')
- Geography of Iran
- International rankings of Iran
- List of deserts by area
- Cities of Iran
- Operation Eagle Claw
