= Lasgerd Rural District =

Rural district in Semnan province, Iran

Lasgerd Rural District Persian: دهستان لاسگرد
- Rural District
- Location within Iran
- Coordinates: 34°54′N 53°18′E
- Country: Iran
- Province: Semnan
- County: Sorkheh
- District: Central
- Established: 1987
- Capital: Lasjerd

Population (2016)
  - Total: 1,973
- Time zone: UTC+3:30 (IRST)

Lasgerd Rural District (Persian: دهستان لاسگرد) is in the Central District (Note: Formerly Sorkheh District of Semnan County) of Sorkheh County, Semnan province, Iran. Its capital is the village of Lasjerd.

== Demographics ==
=== Population ===
At the time of the 2006 National Census, the rural district's population (as a part of Sorkheh District (Note: Renamed the Central District of Sorkheh County) in Semnan County) was 2,135 in 693 households. There were 2,157 inhabitants in 719 households at the following census of 2011. The 2016 census measured the population of the rural district as 1,973 in 740 households, by which time the district had been separated from the county in the establishment of Sorkheh County. The most populous of Lasgerd Rural District's 119 villages was Lasjerd, with 1,024 people.

The district was renamed the Central District in 2021.

=== Other villages in the rural district ===
- Asad Aba
- Barkiyan
- Biyabanak
- Nezami
- Sufiabad
