= Sorkheh =

City in Semnan province, Iran

Sorkheh Persian: سرخه Sorkhei: سور
- City
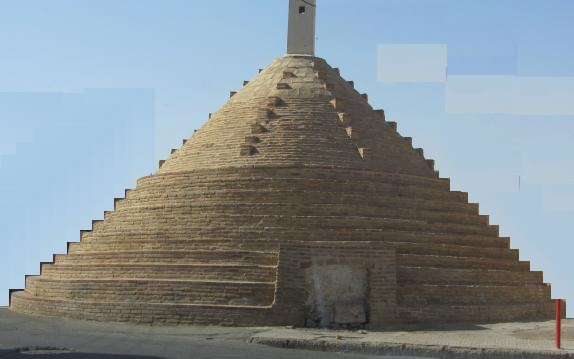
- The historical Ab Anbar of Sorkheh

- Location within Iran
- Coordinates: 35°27′52″N 53°12′31″E
- Country: Iran
- Province: Semnan
- County: Sorkheh
- District: Central

Government
- Elevation: 1,100 m (3,600 ft)

Population (2016)
  - Total: 9,951
- Time zone: UTC+3:30 (IRST)
- Area code: 023
- Language(s): Sorkhei, Persian
- Website: sorkhe.ostan-sm.ir

Sorkheh (Persian: سرخه) (Note: Also known as Surkheh and Sūr (Sorkhei: سور) (English: The Red One)), whose name is often interpreted as “The Red One,” is a city in the Central District (Note: Formerly Sorkheh District of Semnan County) of Sorkheh County, Semnan province, Iran, serving as the capital of the county. Sorkheh was the capital of Sorkheh District (Note: Renamed the Central District of Sorkheh County) until its capital was transferred to the village of Lasjerd when the district was renamed the Central District in 2021.

== Demographics ==
=== Language ===
Most speak Standard Persian. Sorkhei, a Semnani dialect and language, is still spoken by some of its inhabitants.

=== Population ===
At the time of the 2006 National Census, the city's population was 9,062 in 2,686 households, when it was capital of Sorkheh District in Semnan County. The following census in 2011 counted 9,711 people in 3,045 households. The 2016 census measured the population of the city asf 9,951 people in 3,388 households, by which time the district had been separated from the county in the establishment of Sorkheh County and Sorkheh became the new county's capital. The district was renamed the Central District in 2021.

== Notable people ==
- Abbas Ali Akhtari (1939–2022), Shia Cleric & Politician
- Hassan Rouhani (born 1948), 7th President of Iran
- Sahebeh Rouhani (born 1954), Iran's first lady (Hassan Rouhani's wife)
- Hossein Fereydoun (born 1957), Iranian politician.
- Ali Asqar Peyvandi (born 1962), Iranian physician and politician.
- Ruhollah Isari (born 1992), Futsal player.
