= Central District (Semnan County) =

District in Semnan province, Iran

Central District (Semnan County) Persian: بخش مرکزی شهرستان سمنان
- District
- Location within Iran
- Coordinates: 35°07′N 53°49′E
- Country: Iran
- Province: Semnan
- County: Semnan
- Capital: Semnan

Population (2016)
  - Total: 196,521
- Time zone: UTC+3:30 (IRST)

The Central District of Semnan County (Persian: بخش مرکزی شهرستان سمنان) is in Semnan province, Iran. Its capital is the city of Semnan.

== Demographics ==
=== Population ===
At the time of the 2006 National Census, the district's population was 135,872 in 39,101 households. The following census in 2011 counted 167,407 people in 48,518 households. The 2016 census recorded the district's population as 196,521 inhabitants in 52,011 households.

=== Administrative divisions ===
Central District (Semnan County) Population
Administrative Divisions	2006	2011	2016
Howmeh RD	10,873	13,727	11,392
Semnan (city)	124,999	153,680	185,129
Total	135,872	167,407	196,521
RD = Rural District
