= Central District (Sorkheh County) =

District in Semnan province, Iran

Central District (Sorkheh County) Persian: بخش مرکزی شهرستان سرخه
- District
- Location within Iran
- Coordinates: 34°54′N 53°10′E
- Country: Iran
- Province: Semnan
- County: Sorkheh
- Established: 1996
- Capital: Lasjerd

Population (2016)
  - Total: 15,523
- Time zone: UTC+3:30 (IRST)

The Central District of Sorkheh County (Persian: بخش مرکزی شهرستان سرخه) (Note: Formerly Sorkheh District (بخش سرخه) of Semnan County) is in Semnan province, Iran. Its capital is the village of Lasjerd. The previous capital of the district was the city of Sorkheh.

== History ==
In 2012, Sorkheh District (Note: Renamed the Central District of Sorkheh County) was separated from Semnan County in the establishment of Sorkheh County, which was divided into one district of two rural districts, with Sorkheh as its capital and only city at the time. In 2021, Emamzadeh Abdollah Rural District was created in the district, and Hafdar Rural District was separated from it in the formation of Hafdar District.

== Demographics ==
=== Population ===
At the time of the 2006 National Census, the district's population, as Sorkheh District of Semnan County, was 14,194 in 4,195 households. The following census in 2011 counted 14,853 people in 4,659 households. The 2016 census measured the population of the district as 15,523 in 5,330 households.

=== Administrative divisions ===
Central District (Sorkheh County) Population (Note: As Sorkheh District of Semnan County at the 2006 and 2011 censuses)
| Administrative Divisions | 2006 | 2011 | 2016 |
|---|---|---|---|
| Emamzadeh Abdollah RD (Note: Established after the 2016 census) | | | |
| Hafdar RD (Note: Transferred to Hafdar District after the 2016 census) | 2,997 | 2,985 | 3,599 |
| Lasgerd RD | 2,135 | 2,157 | 1,973 |
| Sorkheh (city) | 9,062 | 9,711 | 9,951 |
| Total | 14,194 | 14,853 | 15,523 |
RD = Rural District
