= Sorkheh County =

County in Semnan province, Iran

Sorkheh County Persian: شهرستان سرخه
- County
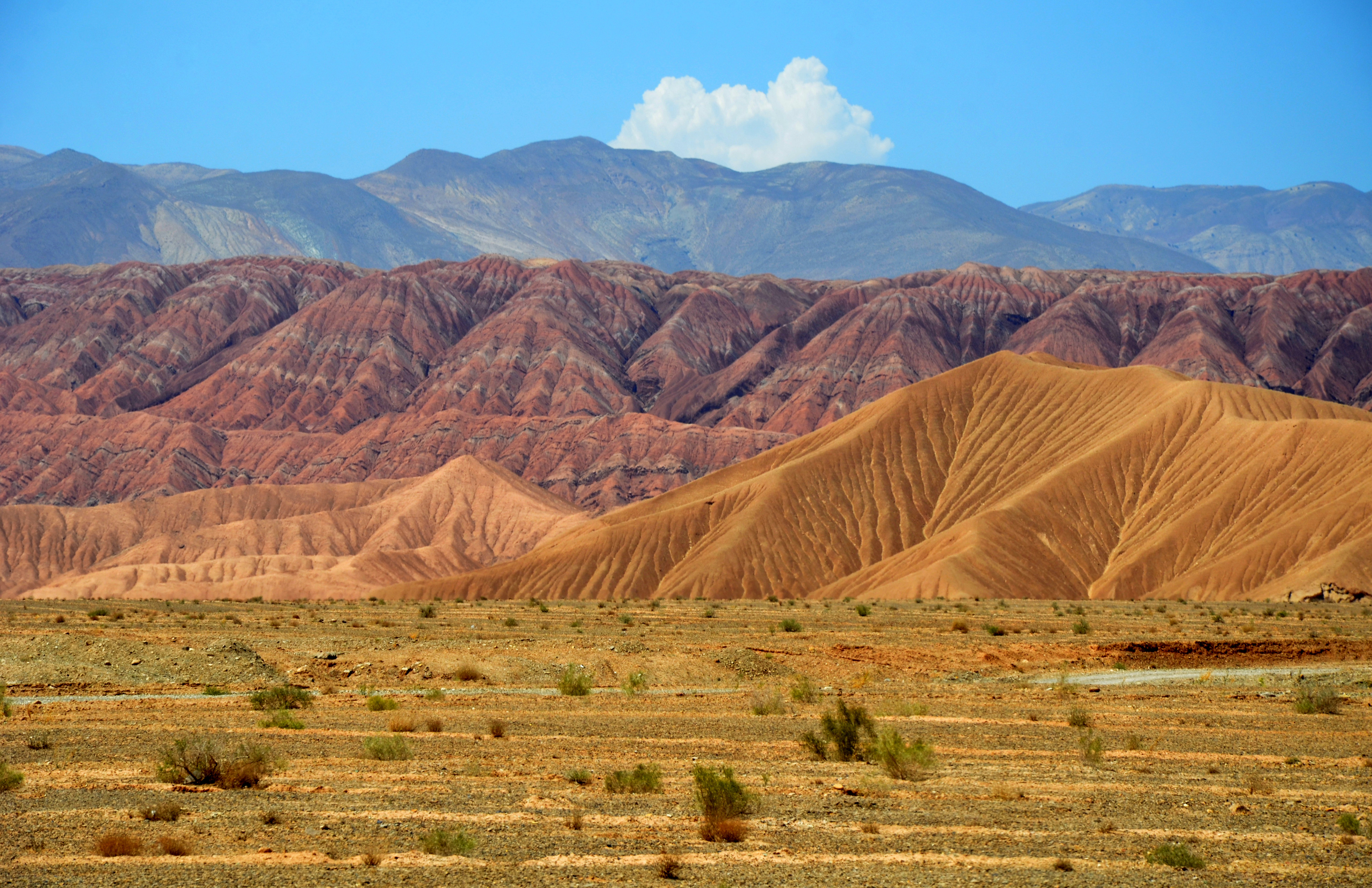
- Landscape in Sorkheh County

- Location of Sorkheh County in Semnan province (left, pink)

- Location of Semnan province in Iran
- Coordinates: 34°59′N 53°10′E
- Country: Iran
- Province: Semnan
- Established: 2012
- Capital: Sorkheh
- Districts: Central, Hafdar

Population (2016)
  - Total: 15,523
- Time zone: UTC+3:30 (IRST)

Sorkheh County (Persian: شهرستان سرخه) is in Semnan province, Iran. Its capital is the city of Sorkheh.

== History ==
In 2012, Sorkheh District (Note: Renamed the Central District of Sorkheh County) was separated from Semnan County in the establishment of Sorkheh County, which was divided into one district of two rural districts, with Sorkheh as its capital and only city at the time. In 2021, Emamzadeh Abdollah Rural District was created in the Central District, and Hafdar Rural District was separated from it in the formation of Hafdar District, including the new Momenabad Rural District.

== Demographics ==
=== Population ===
At the time of the 2016 census, the county's population was 15,523 in 5,330 households.

=== Administrative divisions ===
Sorkheh County's population and administrative structure are shown in the following table.

Sorkheh County Population
Administrative Divisions	2016
Central District (Note: Formerly Sorkheh District of Semnan County)	15,523
Emamzadeh Abdollah RD (Note: Established after the 2016 census)	
Hafdar RD	3,599
Lasgerd RD	1,973
Sorkheh (city)	9,951
Hafdar District	
Hafdar RD	
Momenabad RD	
Total	15,523
RD = Rural District

== See also ==
Media related to Sorkheh County at Wikimedia Commons
