= Semnan County =

County in Semnan province, Iran

Semnan County Persian: شهرستان سمنان
- County
- Location of Semnan County in Semnan province (center, purple)

- Location of Semnan province in Iran
- Coordinates: 35°07′N 53°49′E
- Country: Iran
- Province: Semnan
- Capital: Semnan
- Districts: Central

Population (2016)
  - Total: 196,521
- Time zone: UTC+3:30 (IRST)

Semnan County (Persian: شهرستان سمنان) is in Semnan province, Iran. Its capital is the city of Semnan.

== History ==
In 2007, Mehdishahr District was separated from the county in the establishment of Mehdishahr County. In 2012, Sorkheh District (Note: Renamed the Central District of Sorkheh County) was separated from the county to establish Sorkheh County and renamed the Central District in 2021.

== Demographics ==
=== Population ===
At the time of the 2006 National Census, the county's population was 186,159 in 52,869 households. The following census in 2011 counted 182,260 people in 53,107 households. The 2016 census measured the population of the county as 196,521 in 52,011 households.

=== Administrative divisions ===
Semnan County's population history and administrative structure over three consecutive censuses are shown in the following table.

Semnan County Population
Administrative Divisions	2006	2011	2016
Central District	135,872	167,407	196,521
Howmeh RD	10,873	13,727	11,392
Semnan (city)	124,999	153,680	185,129
Mehdishahr District (Note: Transferred to Mehdishahr County)	36,093		
Chashm RD	6,414		
Poshtkuh RD	1,825		
Mehdishahr (city)	20,581		
Shahmirzad (city)	7,273		
Sorkheh District (Note: Transferred to Sorkheh County and renamed the Central District)	14,194	14,853	
Hafdar RD	2,997	2,985	
Lasgerd RD	2,135	2,157	
Sorkheh (city)	9,062	9,711	
Total	186,159	182,260	196,521
RD = Rural District
