= Semnan province =

Province of Iran

Semnan province استان سمنان (Persian)
- Province
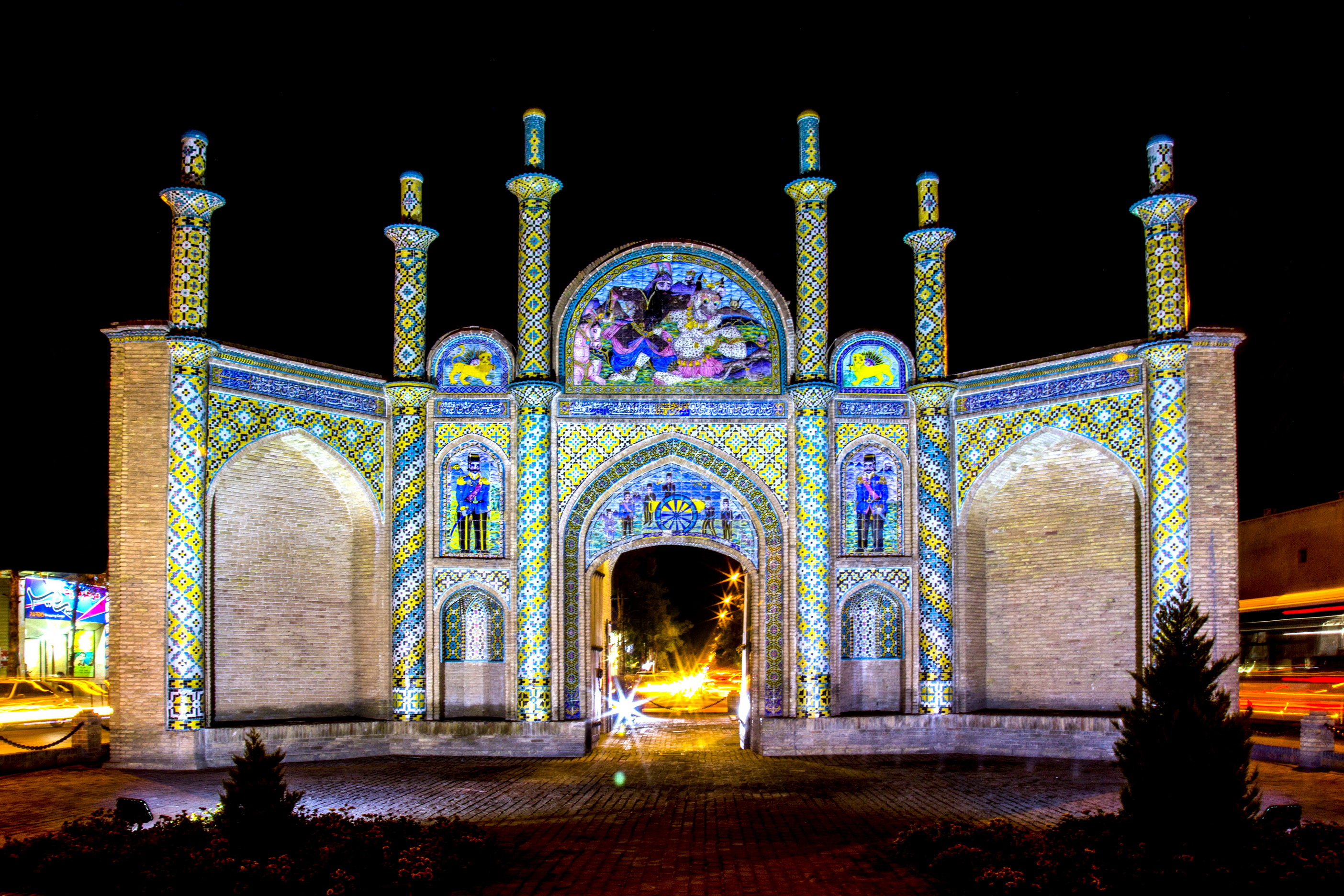
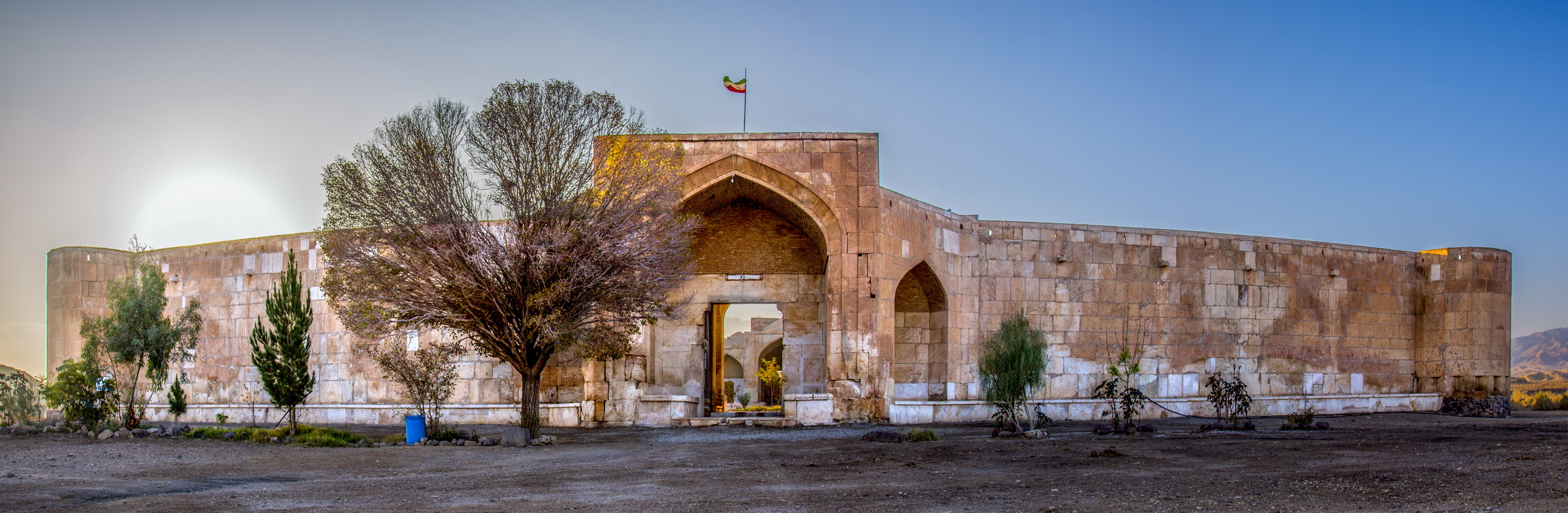
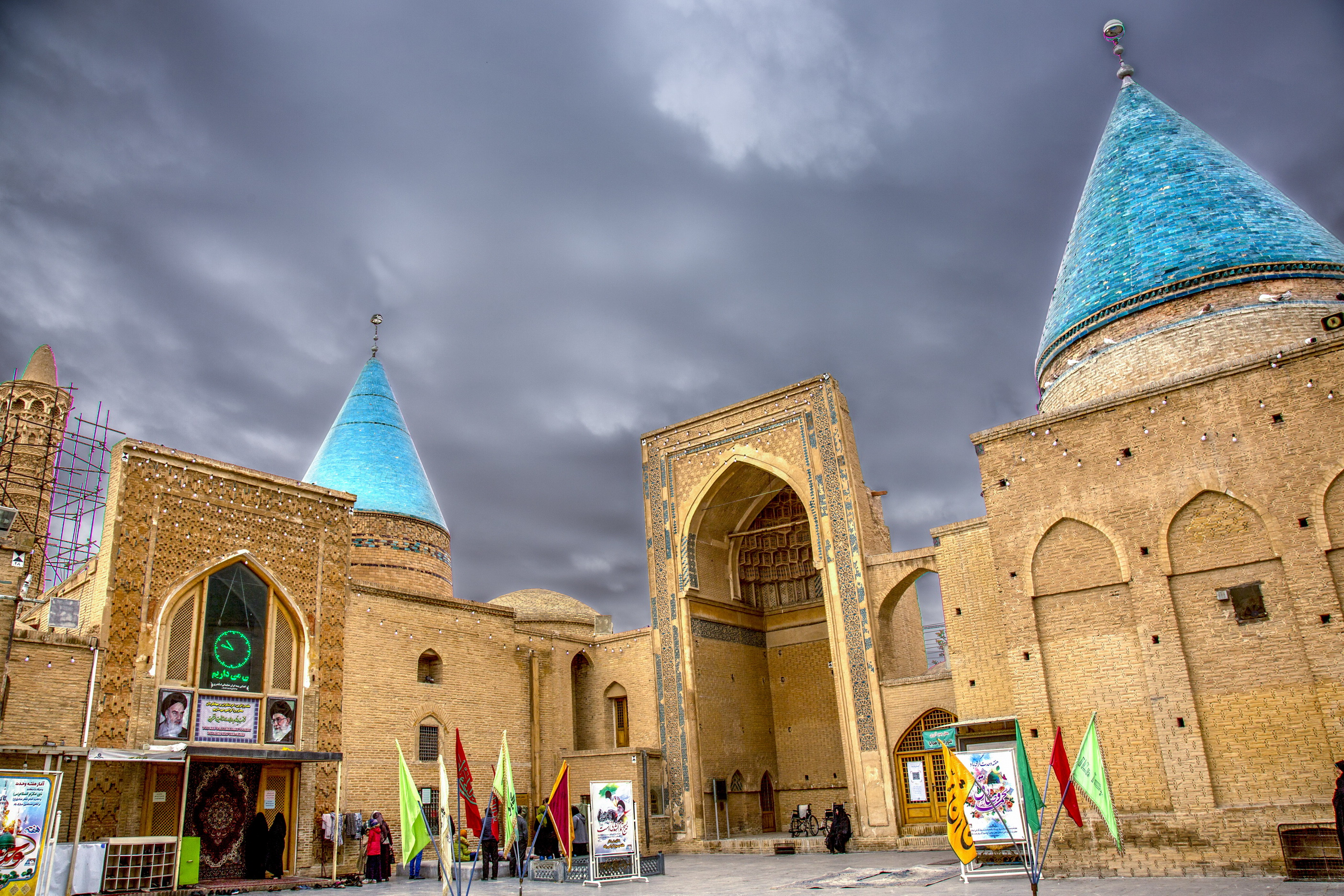
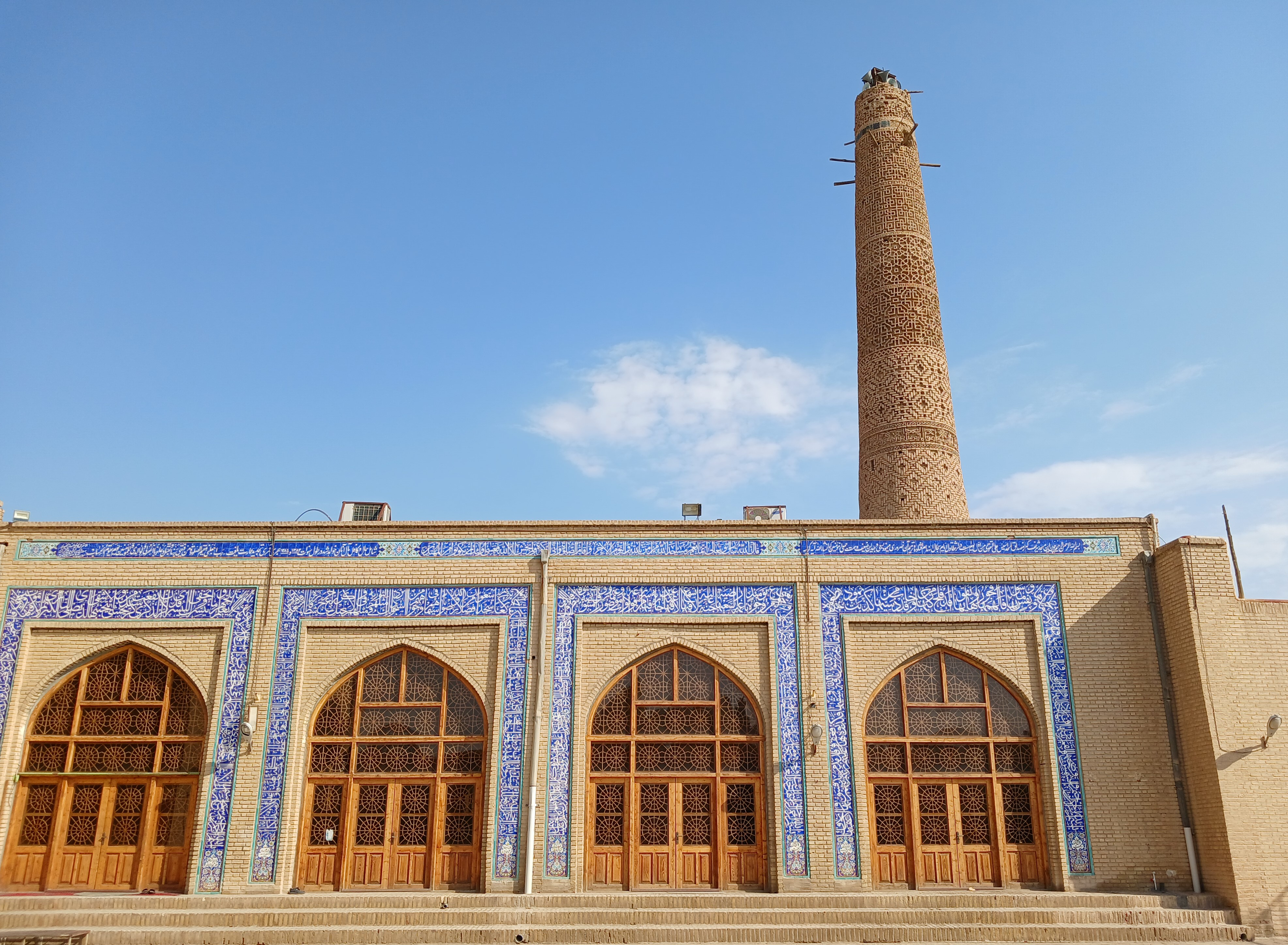
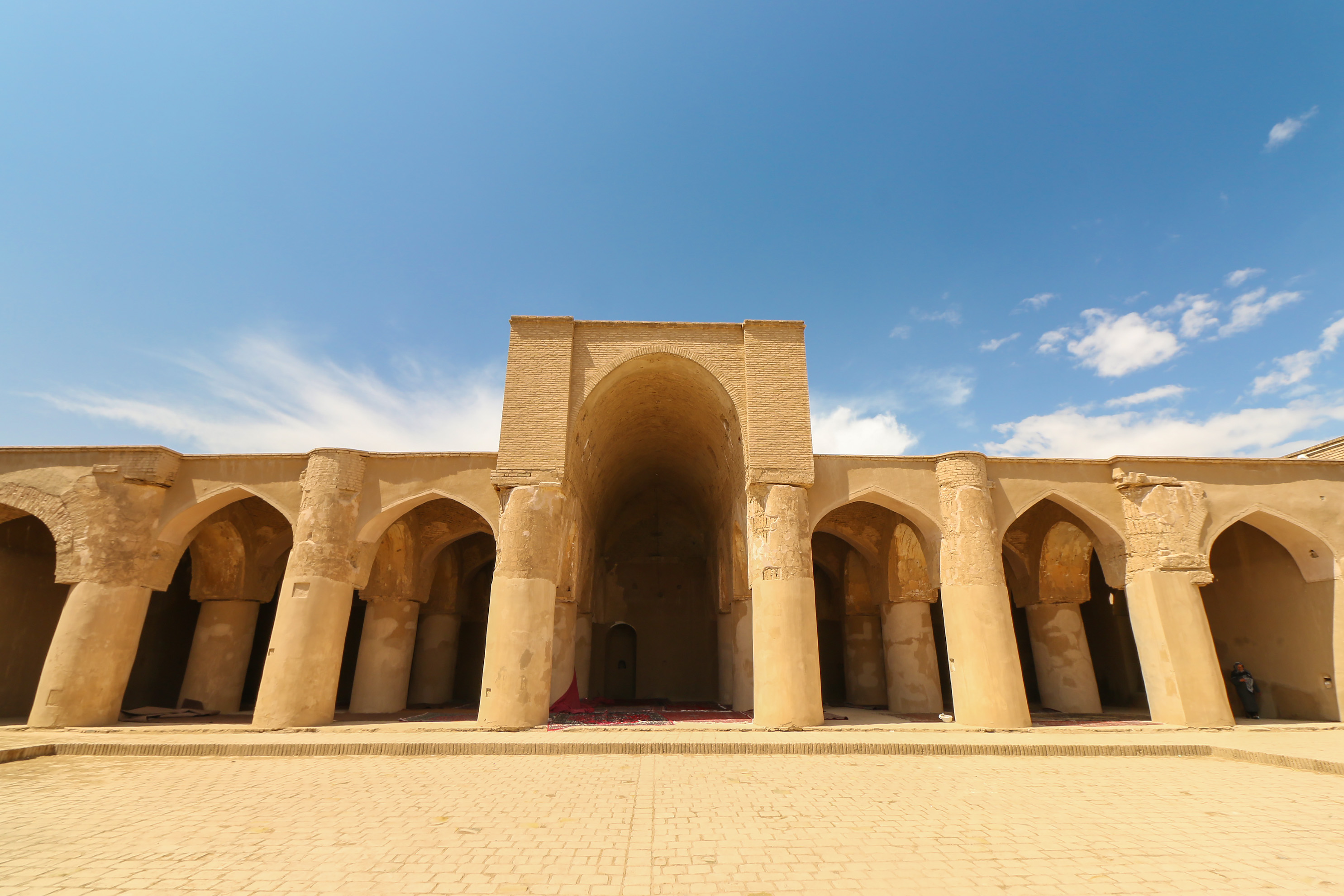
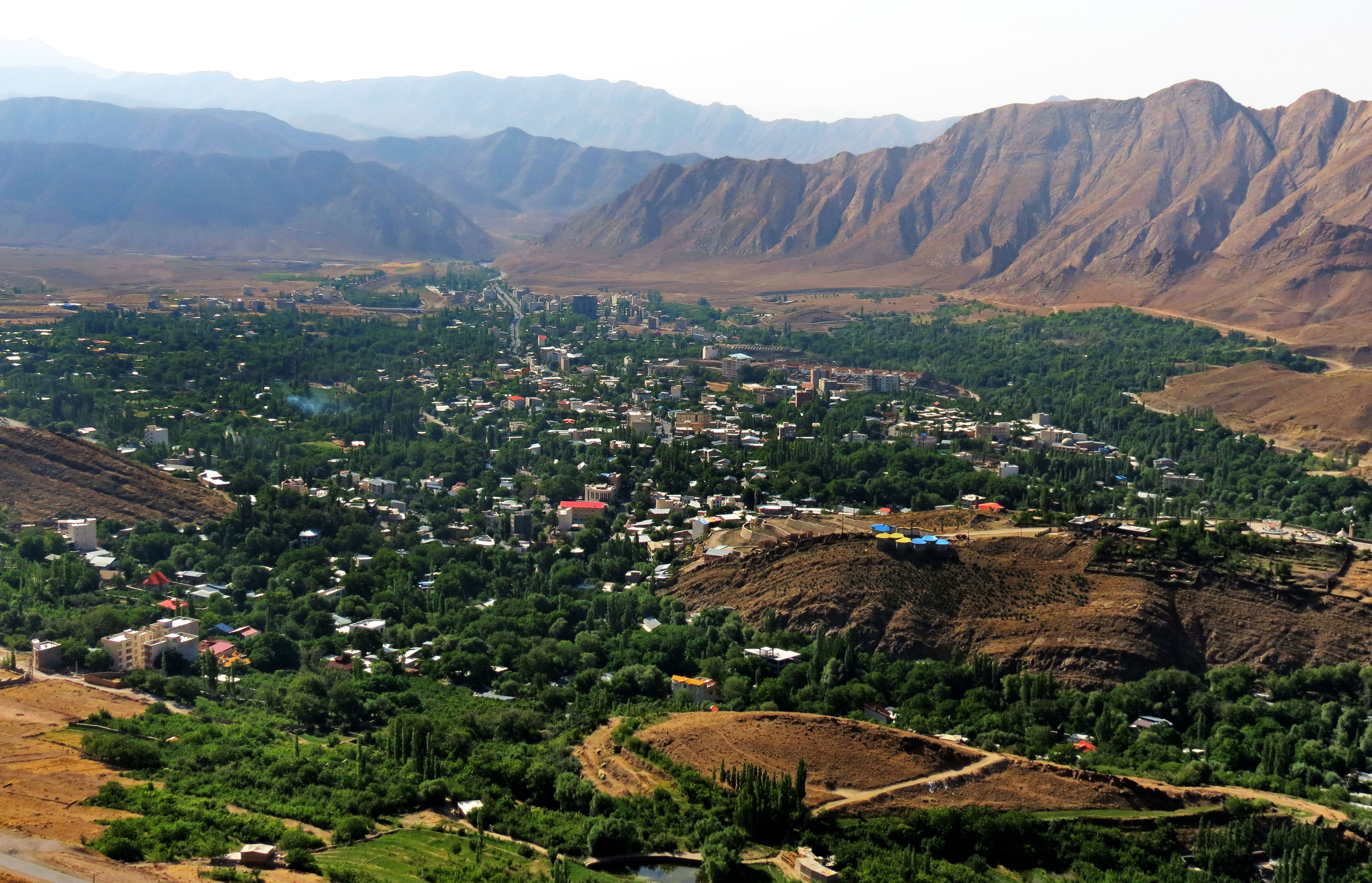

- Location of Semnan province within Iran
- Coordinates: 35°11′N 54°25′E
- Country: Iran
- Region: Region 1
- Capital: Semnan
- Counties: 8

Government
  - Governor-general: Mohammad Javad Kolivand (Independent)

Area
  - Total: 97,491 km^{2} (37,641 sq mi)

Population (2016)
  - Total: 702,360
  - Density: 7.2044/km^{2} (18.659/sq mi)
- Time zone: UTC+03:30 (IRST)
- Area code: 23
- ISO 3166 code: IR-20
- Main language(s): Persian
- HDI (2019): 0.807 very high · 4th

Semnan province (Persian: استان سمنان) (Note: Also romanized as Ostān-e Semnān) is one of the 31 provinces of Iran. It is in the north of the country. Its capital is the city of Semnan.

The province of Semnan covers an area of 96,816 square kilometers and stretches along the Alborz mountain range, bordering on Kavir desert in its southern parts. The province was made part of Region 1 on 22 June 2014, as the provinces were grouped into 5 regions for coordination and development purposes.

== History ==
In the Median and Achaemenid times, Semnan was one of the largest provinces of the empires, and corresponded to the borders of the ancient region of Parthia.

During the Islamic era, Semnan was part of the historical region of Gomess or Komesh.

== Demographics ==
=== Language and ethnicity ===
Majority of Semnanis are Persian. A minority of Various ethnic groups with Kurdish, Azeri, Lor, Arab, Baloch and Gilak origins are settled in this province and it is also known as the Island of the Tribes due to the variety of ethnic groups living in the province.

The Semnani languages (known also as Komisenian languages) spoken in the province are a group of Northwestern Iranian languages, (only 68,700 native speakers in 2019) of Iran. These languages are accorded only "dialect" status in some sources. Most of the Semnani languages are descendants of the extinct Parthian while Semnani proper has been placed among the Caspian languages descended from the extinct Median.

There are six Semnani languages named in the literature, these being Semnani, Biyabunaki, Sangsari, Sorkhei, Aftari and Lasgerdi – of which some may only be dialects, although there has been little published concerning the relationships between them.

Semnani proper (Semnani: سمنی زفون), like other Caspian languages, bears some resemblance to the Old Iranian Median language but was influenced by Parthian in a later process.

=== Population ===
At the time of the 2006 National Census, the province's population was 570,835 in 159,791 households. The following census in 2011 counted 631,218 people in 186,114 households. The 2016 census measured the population of the province as 702,360 in 215,571 households.

Semnan province is located on the southern slopes of the Alborz mountain range. The height of the province decreases from north to south until it reaches the desert. The area of this province is 96000 square kilometers and it is 5.6% of the area of Iran.

=== Administrative divisions ===

The population history and structural changes of Semnan province's administrative divisions over three consecutive censuses are shown in the following table.

Semnan province
Counties	2006	2011	2016
Aradan (Note: Separated from Garmsar County after the 2011 census)	—	—	13,884
Damghan	81,993	86,908	94,190
Garmsar	77,676	81,324	77,421
Mehdishahr (Note: Separated from Semnan County after the 2006 census)	—	41,896	47,475
Meyami (Note: Separated from Shahrud County after the 2011 census)	—	—	38,718
Semnan	186,159	182,260	196,521
Shahrud	225,007	238,830	218,628
Sorkheh (Note: Separated from Semnan County after the 2011 census)	—	—	15,523
Total	570,835	631,218	702,360

=== Cities ===
According to the 2016 census, 560,502 people (nearly 80% of the population of Semnan province) live in the following cities:

City	Population
Amiriyeh	3,561
Aradan	6,257
Bastam	8,609
Beyarjomand	2,528
Damghan	59,106
Darjazin	5,997
Dibaj	5,647
Eyvanki	13,518
Garmsar	48,672
Kalateh	4,611
Kalateh Khij	5,651
Kohanabad	1,192
Mehdishahr	24,485
Meyami	4,566
Mojen	5,932
Rudian	3,770
Semnan	185,129
Shahmirzad	11,191
Shahrud	150,129
Sorkheh	9,951

== Geography ==
The province is divided into two parts: a mountainous region and the plains at the foot of the mountains. The former offers scope for recreational activities as well as being a source for minerals, while the latter encompasses some ancient cities of Iran, including one of the capitals of the ancient Parthian Empire.

The province neighbors Golestan and Mazandaran provinces to the north, North Khorasan province to the northeast, Tehran and Qom provinces to the west, Isfahan province to the south, South Khorasan province to the southeast, and Razavi Khorasan province to the east.

=== Abr forest ===
This forest lies in Semnan province near its border with Golestan province. It is one of the oldest forests in Iran and a remnant of the third geological age. The Iranian Roads Ministry's decision to build a road through the forest sparked widespread protests last year.

The environmentalists, backed by the country's media, began a wide campaign against the ministry's decision, which finally led the Prosecutor General to order a halt in the construction of the road. However, all these efforts came to naught when it was announced in April 2008 that the government granted permission to the Roads Ministry to construct the road.

== See also ==
- Bayazid Bastami
- Ashraf Jahangir Semnani
- Darius III
- Dasht-e Kavir
- Fath Ali Shah Qajar
- Hassan Rouhani
- Hecatompylos or Shahr-e Qumis
- Khar Turan National Park
- Mahmud Ahmadinejad
- Manuchehri Damghani
- Parthia
- Rig-e Jenn
- Sangsar (Mahdishahr)
- Seleucids
- Semnan Space Center
- Semnani language
- Yadollah Royaee

Media related to Semnan Province at Wikimedia Commons
