= Nosratollah =

Nosratollah is a given name. Notable people with the given name include:

- Nosratollah Amini (1915–2009), Iranian lawyer
- Nosratollah Jahanshahlou (1913–2012), Iranian politician
- Nosratollah Khosravi-Roodsari, Iranian-American prisoner
- Nosratollah Momtahen (1930–2013), Iranian sports shooter
- Nosratollah Noohian (1931–2020), Iranian poet
- Nosratollah Vahdat (1925–2020), Iranian comedian
