= Semnan, Iran =

City in Semnan province, Iran

Semnan سمنان، سَمَن Samnan
- City
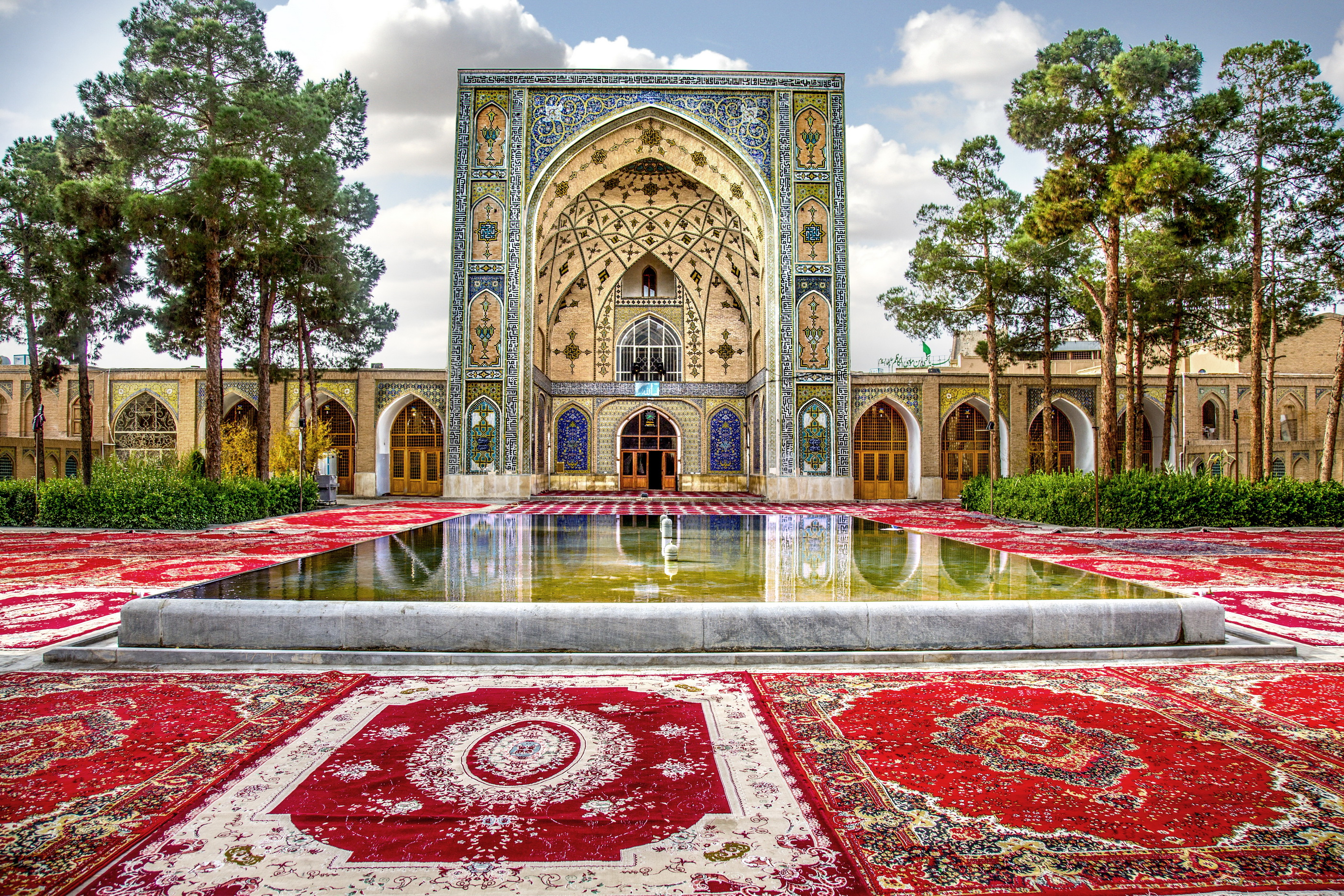
- Imam Soltani mosque

- Seal
- Nickname: City of Compassion
- Motto(s): Welcome; خوش امیچین
- Location within Iran
- Coordinates: 35°34′52″N 53°23′00″E
- Country: Iran
- Province: Semnan
- County: Semnan
- District: Central
- Settled: circa 240BCE by Parni tribesmen
- Incorporated (city): 1926

Government
  - Type: Municipality
  - Mayor: Seyed Hossein Mousavi
- Elevation: 1,130 m (3,710 ft)

Population (2016)
  - Total: 185,129
- Time zone: UTC+3:30 (IRST)
- Area code: +98 23
- Main Languages: Persian, Semnani
- Climate: BWh
- Website: www.semnan.ir

Semnan (Persian: سمنان; pronounced [semˈnɒːn]) (Note: Also romanized as Samnān and Semnān) is a city in the Central District of Semnan County, Semnan province, Iran, serving as capital of the province, the county and the district. The city is on the alluvial fan of the Golrudbar creek in the north-central part of the country, 216 km east of Tehran and 640 km west of Mashhad. With a population of 185,129 people in 2016, Semnan is the hub of the Semnani language, a sub-branch of the Iranian languages spoken to the north. It is home to the Semnani ethnic group.

Semnan offers various recreational activities; historical and religious sites; festivals, gardens and parks; and centers of higher education and Semnani culture. The city is the cultural and political capital of Semnan province. The city's main souvenirs are daffodil flowers, Shirmal pastry, Koloocheh cookies, kilim rugs, and shortbread.

== Etymology ==
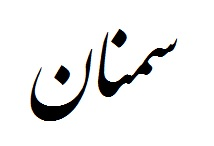
The name "Semnan" in Persian calligraphy.

There are several theories which seek to explain the origin of the name Semnan.

1. Semnan was an ancient pre-zoroastrian city in which the locals practiced idol-worshipping. Their religion was called samīna, hence the name Semnan.
2. Semnan was an ancient civil establishment by the Scythians, an Iranian people who named their settlement Sakanān.
3. A theory produced by the local people themselves claims the first settlers of Semnan were two of the Prophet Noah's children, Sim An-Nabi and Lam An-Nabi, and that their settlement became known as Simlam; the local people believe that over time the name Simlam turned into Semnan.
4. Semnan was established by the mythical character Tahmuras, and that he named his city Saminā.
5. The ancient regional language was known as Sa ma nān, and that the city of these people took on the name of their language.
6. The name Semnan comes from the phrase sa ma nān, which is supposed to be a corrupted Persian way of saying 'three months of bread.' This phrase traces back to the Semnani women's tradition of cooking three months worth of bread in one day.

== History ==
=== Pre-Islamic Era ===
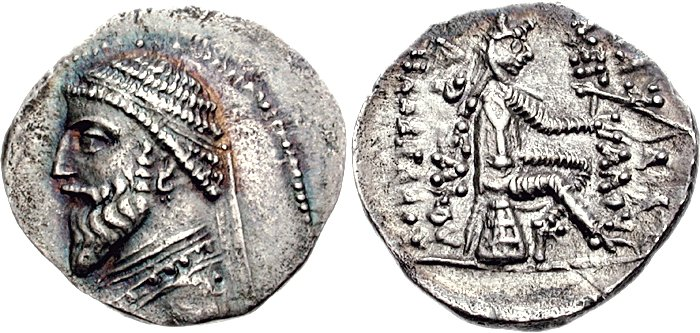
Coinage during the Parthian Era

The city of Semnan has historically been one of the fourteen civil establishments of the ancient, Avesta-era province of "Vern." Semnan remained an important city throughout the era of the Persian Achaemenid Empire. After the invasion of Alexander the Great, which resulted in the fall of the Achaemenid Empire, and the establishment of the Seleucid Empire, the region which hosts the city of Semnan became known as Komesh. The beginning of the prosperous era of the city arrived with the rise of the Arsacid dynasty of Parthia. The Parthians are an Iranian people. The Arsacid dynasty of Parthia was very interested in the importing of Hellenism, or Greek culture. This resulted in the pioneering of sculpting and other forms of Western art in the city of Semnan. One of the capital cities of the Parthian Empire was Hecatompylos, and its ruins and numerous historical sites remain between the modern day city of Semnan and Damghan. With the fall of the Parthian Empire, and the rise of the Persian Sassanid Empire, Zoroastrianism was chosen as the state religion, and the city of Semnan was once again brought under the reign of Persian customs and traditions.

=== Post-Islamic Era ===
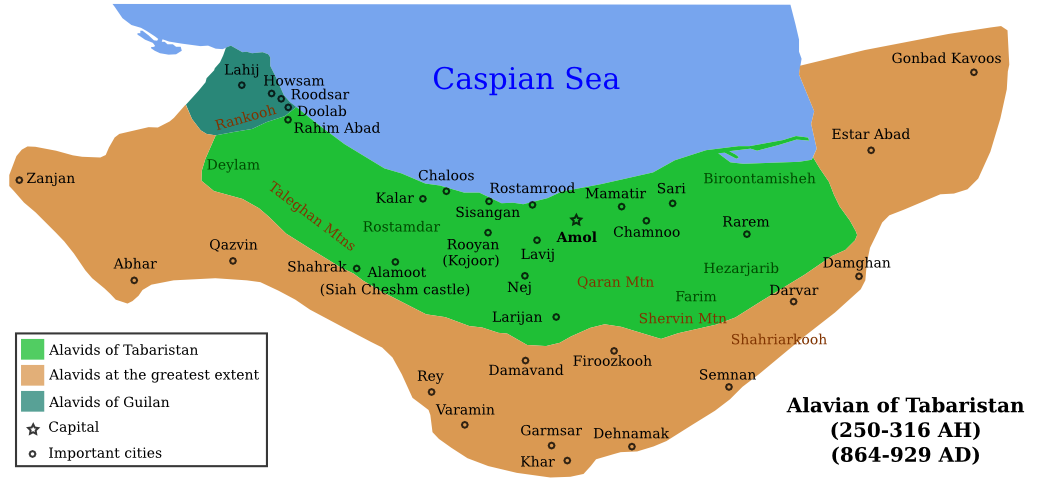
Semnan within the bounds of the Shi'a Alavid Emirate

After the Muslim conquest of Persia, the religion of Islam was established within the city of Semnan. Though, unlike modern day Semnan, the people of the city originally practiced Sunni Islam, similar to the rest of early Islamic Persia. However, the institution of Sunni Islam did not last very long. The Alavids of Tabaristan had established a Shi'a Islamic emirate and upon conquering Semnan, brought the Zaidi Shi'a sect of Islam. Then, in the year 427 AH, the Seljuq Turks invaded and devastated the city. Nevertheless, it was the very Seljuq Turks that built many of the historical monuments and infrastructure of medieval Semnan. As the Seljuq Empire grew weak, the Abbasids managed to reconquer and assert their sovereignty over Persia. The people of Semnan suffered severely under the Abbasid Caliphate. It is possible that the years of Abbasid rule traumatized the people of Semnan, and even to this day, the Semnani people despise the color black because of its utilization for the black flags of the Abbasid Caliphate. The Abbasid rule was ended by the brutal, devastating invasion of the Mongols in the year of 618 AH. The Mongol hordes massacred the people and burnt much of the city to the ground. Semnan would not recover until the rise of the Turco-Persian Safavid dynasty. The Safavids brought the Twelver Shi'ism sect of Islam to Semnan, and contributed to the reconstruction of the city.

=== Qajar Era ===
Imperial emblem of the Qajar dynasty

With the rise of the Qajar dynasty, historical Semnan witnessed economical, cultural, infrastructural, and political progress. The very tribe that rose into becoming the Qajar dynasty was based out of the mountainous terrain between modern-day Semnan, Mazandaran, and Golestan. The Qajars turned Semnan into a civil fortress, from which they oversaw the major trade route between their capital in Tehran and the holy city of Mashad. In addition to infrastructural growth, some Qajar royals built their estates in the city. Semnan was also an important medical center for members of the Qajar imperial family and was home to many notable physicians and doctors of the era. Economically, the city consisted of several feudal estates with agricultural plantations which relied on serf labor.

=== Pahlavi Era ===
The Pahlavi era marked the transition of Semnan into the industrial era. Semnan's original loyalty to the Qajar dynasty and the city's importance under the Qajars prompted a lot of anti-Pahlavi sentiment with the rise of Reza Shah. Reza Shah Pahlavi's government began the immediate construction of modern infrastructure and paved roads throughout the city, however, this called for the destruction of the citadel of Semnan and the artistic monuments of the Qajars. Upon attempting to destroy the Gate of Semnan, the locals chained themselves to the building and stopped its destruction. Many prominent families in Semnan were also restricted from attaining high political posts as a result of their previous connection with and service to the Qajar imperial family. This resulted in the exodus of many prominent Semnani families to Tehran during the early Pahlavi era. Despite the tension and confrontation, the Pahlavi dynasty was successful in transforming Semnan into a more modern city. Throughout the early Pahlavi era, Semnan experienced several rounds of extreme drought, famine, crop devastation, and poverty. Prominent Semnani language poets such as Nosratollah Nouhian encouraged the Farmers and General Labor class to rise up and demand their rights from the unjust, well-fed landlords who were carelessly watching the very farmers who grew the food starve and deteriorate into ruin and agony:

دیگه صبر و قناعت وسه پی با
دیگه ظلم شقاوت وسه پی با

Patience and contentment is no more, rise up!
Oppression and atrociousness shall be no more, rise up!
―Nosratollah Nouhian

== Demographics ==
=== Language and ethnicity ===
The majority of the city dwellers are Persians. Older Semnan was made up of four main districts: Shaji (Shahjoo), Naasaar, Latibaar and Espanjon (Esfanjan). These four districts still exist today, but the city has grown and become much larger including some new districts. To the west of the city is "Maleh" which used to be a separate settlement but was not a part of Semnan. In the local language the inhabitants are known as Malezh. "Maleh" consists of three parts: Koery (Kodivar), Koshmeni (Kushmaqaan) and Zaveni (Zavaqaan). "Maleh" is now part of Semnan.

As a result of the Qajar dynasty's heavy influence on the city of Semnan, especially under Fath Ali Shah's reign, some families in Semnan can trace their lineage back to the Qajar dynasty.

Also, much of the city's Sayyid population tends to descend from the Alavids of the Caspian region to the north of the province.

==== Semnani language ====
The city also has its own language known as "Zaban e Semnani" in Persian or "Semani Zefön" in the Semnani language of the locals. The Iranian Constitution recognizes the use of regional dialects and languages, and permits their usage second to the Persian language.

According to the book Dictionary of Semnan Ancient Dialect, Semnan traditionally has had its own language. The book collected more than 12,000 words belonging to this language. The local people call their language Semani. Most of the older generations and some among the younger generations of the city still know and maintain communication in this language. However, the majority of the younger generations do not communicate in Semani as a result of schooling and education in Persian.

=== Religion ===
The people of the city of Semnan are almost all entirely Shi'a Muslim. The Shi'a Islamic faith dominates the culture, norms, traditions, and beliefs of the city, and continues to dictate the style of life in city. As a result, the celebrations, rituals, and days of religious mourning play a major role in the life of a Semnani city dweller, and are for some families, more important that the national Iranian customs and holidays. The majority of the people of Semnan observe Shi'a Islam quite conservatively; hence, the martyrdom and birthdays of Shi'a Imams are very important days on the calendar.

=== Population ===
At the time of the 2006 National Census, the city's population was 124,999 in 36,298 households. The following census in 2011 counted 153,680 people in 45,311 households. The 2016 census measured the population of the city as 185,129 people in 49,124 households.

== Geography ==
=== Location ===
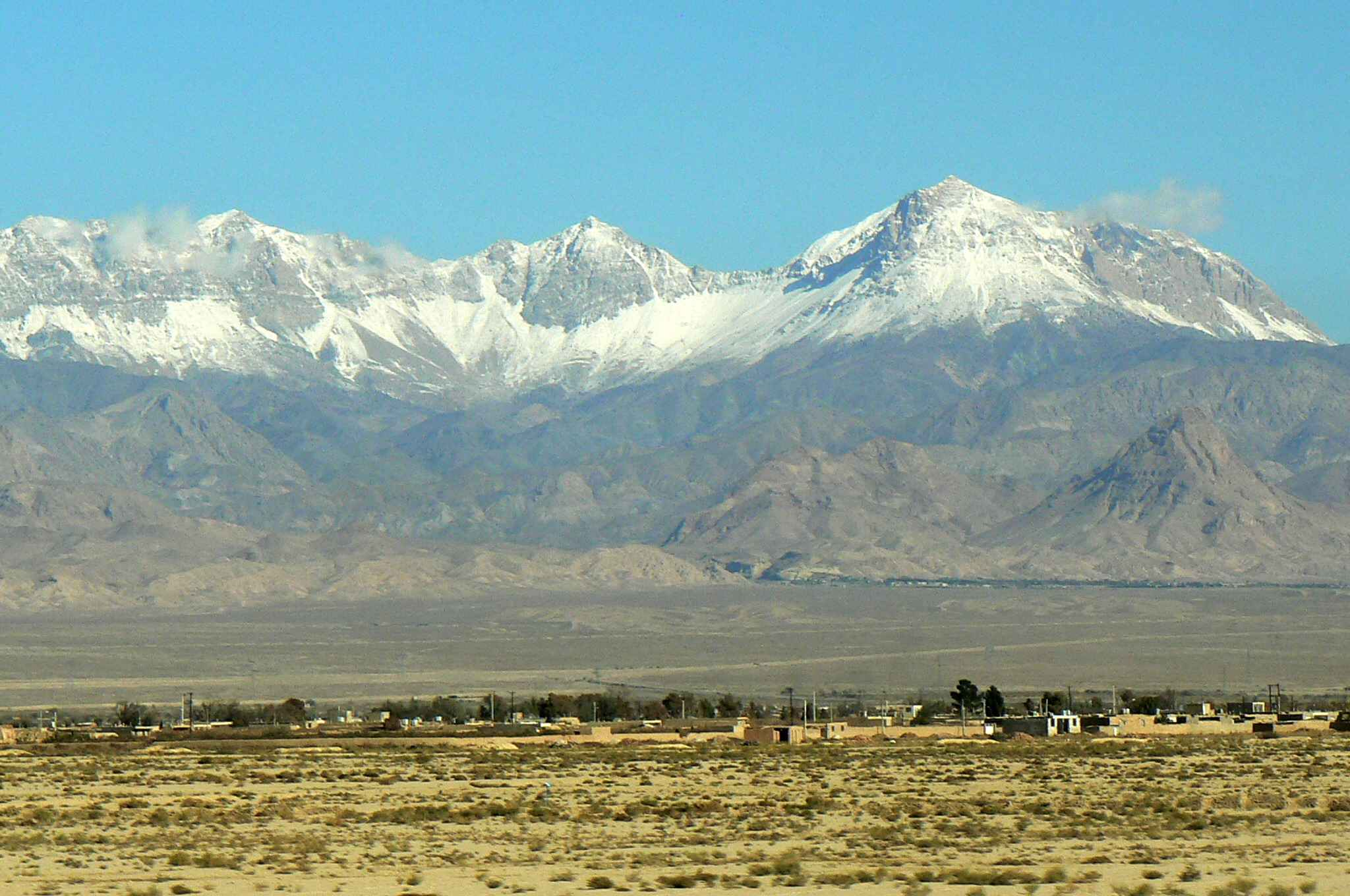
Typical terrain and geography of the region

The city of Semnan is situated on an alluvial fan at 1,138 metres above sea level, straddling the southern foothills of the Alborz Mountains and the vast desert plain to the south of the city. The Golrudbar creek, which begins in the mountains to the north of Shahmirzad, has historically provided a reliable supply of water for municipal and agricultural consumption. Irrigation methods since ancient times have allowed the people of Semnan to drink clean water, raise livestock such as cattle and sheep, and cultivate diverse crops.

=== Climate ===
Semnan has a hot desert climate (BWh) bordering a cold desert climate (BWk) according to the Köppen climate classification. The city enjoys the traditional four seasons of winter, spring, summer, and autumn each year.

The rain season starts in December and lasts into May, however, precipitation throughout the rain season is generally very light. During some winters, moisture-abundant blizzards make their way down from the Alborz mountains to the north of the city and dump several centimeters of snow in a single twenty-four-hour period. As a result of the city's position straddling the open desert plain, many winter days are dominated by a cold and gusty wind that often produces a potent windchill factor which makes the city feel much colder than the actual air temperature. According to Iranian Meteorological statistics, Semnan experiences around 44.5 days in which the minimum temperature falls below freezing each year.

Spring is characterized by mild to warm day temperatures and cold to cool nights. Minimum temperatures do not fall below freezing from May to October and rarely do so in March, April and November.

Summers are often hot during the day and mildly warm at night. Summer months remain extremely dry with only trace amounts of rain. Occasionally, moisture from the Caspian Sea passes over the High Alborz. With the right amount of heat and moisture, thunderstorms may develop during the afternoon and evening hours. Though the amount of precipitation is light, these thunderstorms often produce strong and gusty winds with frequent lightning strikes.

Autumn is mostly a transitional season.

Climate data for Semnan (1991-2020, extremes 1965-present)
Month	Jan	Feb	Mar	Apr	May	Jun	Jul	Aug	Sep	Oct	Nov	Dec	Year
Record high °C (°F)	20.0 (68.0)	26.4 (79.5)	31.0 (87.8)	35.4 (95.7)	38.6 (101.5)	43.0 (109.4)	44.4 (111.9)	43.8 (110.8)	40.0 (104.0)	34.4 (93.9)	27.2 (81.0)	20.2 (68.4)	44.4 (111.9)
Mean daily maximum °C (°F)	9.0 (48.2)	11.9 (53.4)	17.6 (63.7)	24.1 (75.4)	30.0 (86.0)	35.7 (96.3)	38.1 (100.6)	37.0 (98.6)	32.7 (90.9)	25.5 (77.9)	16.5 (61.7)	10.5 (50.9)	24.1 (75.4)
Daily mean °C (°F)	4.1 (39.4)	6.7 (44.1)	12.0 (53.6)	18.3 (64.9)	24.2 (75.6)	29.7 (85.5)	32.3 (90.1)	30.9 (87.6)	26.5 (79.7)	19.6 (67.3)	11.2 (52.2)	5.6 (42.1)	18.4 (65.1)
Mean daily minimum °C (°F)	−0.3 (31.5)	1.7 (35.1)	6.4 (43.5)	12.3 (54.1)	17.8 (64.0)	23.2 (73.8)	26.2 (79.2)	24.6 (76.3)	20.2 (68.4)	13.9 (57.0)	6.5 (43.7)	1.3 (34.3)	12.8 (55.0)
Record low °C (°F)	−12.6 (9.3)	−9.0 (15.8)	−7 (19)	−2.0 (28.4)	5.0 (41.0)	10.0 (50.0)	16.8 (62.2)	12.4 (54.3)	7.0 (44.6)	2.0 (35.6)	−9 (16)	−8 (18)	−12.6 (9.3)
Average precipitation mm (inches)	15.5 (0.61)	21.2 (0.83)	23.1 (0.91)	19.6 (0.77)	11.9 (0.47)	4.4 (0.17)	3.1 (0.12)	2.2 (0.09)	2.7 (0.11)	6.0 (0.24)	11.7 (0.46)	15.7 (0.62)	137.1 (5.40)
Average snowfall cm (inches)	2.2 (0.9)	0.2 (0.1)	0.0 (0.0)	0.0 (0.0)	0.0 (0.0)	0.0 (0.0)	0.0 (0.0)	0.0 (0.0)	0.0 (0.0)	0.0 (0.0)	0.0 (0.0)	1.5 (0.6)	3.9 (1.6)
Average precipitation days (≥ 1.0 mm)	2.9	3.2	3.5	4.1	2.1	1.0	0.7	0.5	0.5	1.2	2.5	2.8	25.0
Average relative humidity (%)	60	52	42	36	28	23	24	24	26	35	50	62	38.5
Average dew point °C (°F)	−3.5 (25.7)	−3.5 (25.7)	−2.1 (28.2)	1.3 (34.3)	3.3 (37.9)	5.1 (41.2)	7.8 (46.0)	6.8 (44.2)	4.1 (39.4)	2.5 (36.5)	0.2 (32.4)	−1.7 (28.9)	1.7 (35.0)
Mean monthly sunshine hours	188	193	223	245	292	336	338	341	306	266	195	173	3,096
Source 1: NOAA NCEI (snowfall 1981-2010)
Source 2: Iran Meteorological Organization (records)

Climate data for Semnan (1965-2010, records and temperature normals 1965-present)
Month	Jan	Feb	Mar	Apr	May	Jun	Jul	Aug	Sep	Oct	Nov	Dec	Year
Record high °C (°F)	20.0 (68.0)	26.4 (79.5)	31.0 (87.8)	35.4 (95.7)	38.6 (101.5)	43.0 (109.4)	44.4 (111.9)	43.8 (110.8)	40.0 (104.0)	34.4 (93.9)	27.2 (81.0)	20.2 (68.4)	44.4 (111.9)
Mean daily maximum °C (°F)	8.7 (47.7)	11.6 (52.9)	17.3 (63.1)	24.2 (75.6)	29.9 (85.8)	35.6 (96.1)	38.0 (100.4)	36.8 (98.2)	32.8 (91.0)	25.4 (77.7)	17.0 (62.6)	10.7 (51.3)	24.0 (75.2)
Daily mean °C (°F)	4.1 (39.4)	6.5 (43.7)	11.8 (53.2)	18.3 (64.9)	23.8 (74.8)	29.4 (84.9)	32.0 (89.6)	30.6 (87.1)	26.5 (79.7)	19.6 (67.3)	11.9 (53.4)	6.1 (43.0)	18.4 (65.1)
Mean daily minimum °C (°F)	−0.5 (31.1)	1.4 (34.5)	6.3 (43.3)	12.3 (54.1)	17.7 (63.9)	23.1 (73.6)	25.9 (78.6)	24.3 (75.7)	20.1 (68.2)	13.7 (56.7)	6.7 (44.1)	1.5 (34.7)	12.7 (54.9)
Record low °C (°F)	−12.6 (9.3)	−9.0 (15.8)	−7 (19)	−2.0 (28.4)	5.0 (41.0)	10.0 (50.0)	16.8 (62.2)	12.4 (54.3)	7.0 (44.6)	2.0 (35.6)	−9 (16)	−8 (18)	−12.6 (9.3)
Average precipitation mm (inches)	19.9 (0.78)	20.9 (0.82)	25.0 (0.98)	16.5 (0.65)	13.0 (0.51)	4.1 (0.16)	3.0 (0.12)	2.6 (0.10)	1.5 (0.06)	6.2 (0.24)	9.5 (0.37)	18.5 (0.73)	140.7 (5.52)
Average snowfall cm (inches)	2.2 (0.9)	0.2 (0.1)	0.0 (0.0)	0.0 (0.0)	0.0 (0.0)	0.0 (0.0)	0.0 (0.0)	0.0 (0.0)	0.0 (0.0)	0.0 (0.0)	0.0 (0.0)	1.5 (0.6)	3.9 (1.6)
Average rainy days	6.5	5.2	7.2	6.0	6.2	2.4	1.4	1.3	0.8	3.3	3.3	5.1	48.7
Average snowy days	3.3	1.7	0.7	0	0	0	0	0	0	0	0	1.1	6.8
Average relative humidity (%)	63	55	46	38	33	27	27	28	28	38	48	62	41
Average dew point °C (°F)	−3.5 (25.7)	−3.5 (25.7)	−2.1 (28.2)	1.3 (34.3)	3.3 (37.9)	5.1 (41.2)	7.8 (46.0)	6.8 (44.2)	4.1 (39.4)	2.5 (36.5)	0.2 (32.4)	−1.7 (28.9)	1.7 (35.0)
Mean monthly sunshine hours	188	193	223	245	292	336	338	341	306	266	195	173	3,096
Source 1: Iran Meteorological Organization (records), (temperatures), (precipitation), (humidity),
Source 2: NCEI (dew point and sun 1991-2020, snowfall 1981-2010)

== Historical sites and places of interest ==
Due to the relatively small size of Semnan when compared to other major Iranian cities such as Tehran, Tabriz, and Mashad, Semnan's rich historical monuments and scholarly figures are often forgotten. The following are some of the city's historical sites and places of interest:

=== Religious structures ===
- Jāmeh Mosque of Semnan – built nearly 1,000 years ago by the Seljuq Turks over what used to be an ancient Zoroastrian fire temple. This ancient mosque also includes the famous Seljuq minaret with archaic carvings and designs.
- Imam Mosque (or Soltani Mosque) – built under the Qajar dynasty, this mosque is a rare four-terrace mosque. The design of the Imam Mosque utilized the expertise of Iranian architecture of the time, providing all sectors of the complex with equal acoustic sound systems.
- The Shrine of Sheikh Ala'ed-dowleh Semnani – this shrine was constructed by the Safavid dynasty in honor of Sheikh Ala'ed-dowleh Semnani, a major Sufi mystic and poet of Iran.
- Threshold of the Alavids – a memorial shrine to the Alavid sayyids that administered the affairs of the city during the reign of the Alavid dynasty, centered in the ancient region of Tabaristan. The shrine also has religious value, being that the Alavids were the direct descendants of the second Shi'a Imam, Imam Hassan.
- Imamzadeh Yahya Mosque – aside from the mosque's aesthetic tile work and architectural design, this is a designated place of Ziyarah, or Islamic pilgrimage. The mosque is characterized by its massive entrance, stained glass windows, glossy marble flooring, and unique interior design.
- Imamzadeh Ali ibn Jafar Mosque – a place of Ziyarah, with aesthetic tile work and architectural design. The mosque is characterized by its green domes and a massive adobe dome that towers above the complex.
- Imamzadeh Ali ibn Ashraf Mosque – a place of Ziyarah.
- Memorial of the Martyrs (Mezar Shohada) – this building was constructed as an interior cemetery for the soldiers of Semnan that were martyred in the brutal Iran–Iraq War of 1980–1988. The building consists of a glossy marble flooring, elegant chandeliers, murals, and stained glass windows.
- Hakim Elahi Mausoleum – Hakim Elahi was a prominent scholar of Islam and philosophy.

=== Secular structures ===
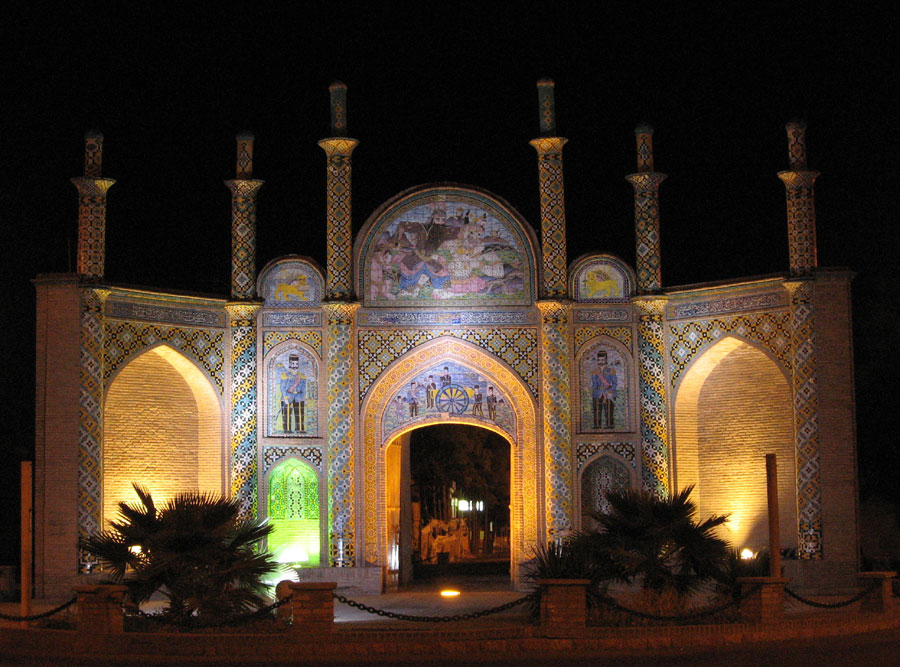
Historical entrance to the Semnan Citadel at night

- Pehne Hot Springs – a public bath house which uses hot therapeutic waters. These waters are utilized for relaxation as well as hydrotherapy.
- The Gate of the Semnan Fortress – built by the Qajar dynasty under Prince Bahman Mirzaye Baha'ed-dowleh, the son of Fath Ali Shah Qajar. Unfortunately, Reza Shah Pahlavi destroyed the other three entrances and the walls around the old city under the pretext of road construction.
- Semnan Bazaar – the place to buy the souvenirs, handicrafts, appliances, food items, etc.
- Pehne Bazaar – a large and vast center of commerce with multiple wings. Similar to most bazaars in Iran, Pehne Bazaar has almost all the necessities as well as local products.
- Sheikh Ala'ed-dowleh Bazaar – a traditional center of commerce that carries all the basic necessities as well as tourist items.
- Tadayyon House – a mansion style home of the wealthy class in the Qajar era of Semnan. This multi-story complex consists of a stable, a massive kitchen, a traditional cistern of water, along with a towering windcatcher, signature of Iran's arid cities. The complex also features a unique Azerbaijani architectural design, signature of Qajar era buildings.
- The Interior Gardens of Semnan (Baghat Dakhil Shahr) – these massive gardens cover the entire southwestern portion of the city in a green, lush, and forested environment. The main trees that dominate the landscape are walnut and pomegranate trees. Within the gardens are numerous creeks trickling along the irrigated paths, as well as traditional adobe brick homes which provide much of the housing for the Maleh district of Semnan.
- The Garden Restaurant – is a traditional restaurant in the city of Semnan offering traditional Iranian cuisine, including local dishes and outdoor dining. The restaurant features an entrance arch decorated with stained glass mosaic windows leading into a large courtyard filled with fountains, trees, flowers, and running water.
- Qich Qaleh hotel museum - the hotel museum has been built by a construction worker from Qich Qaleh village in Semnan Province. The man, who has turned his own house into the anthropology museum, hosts tourists from all over the country at his local residence.

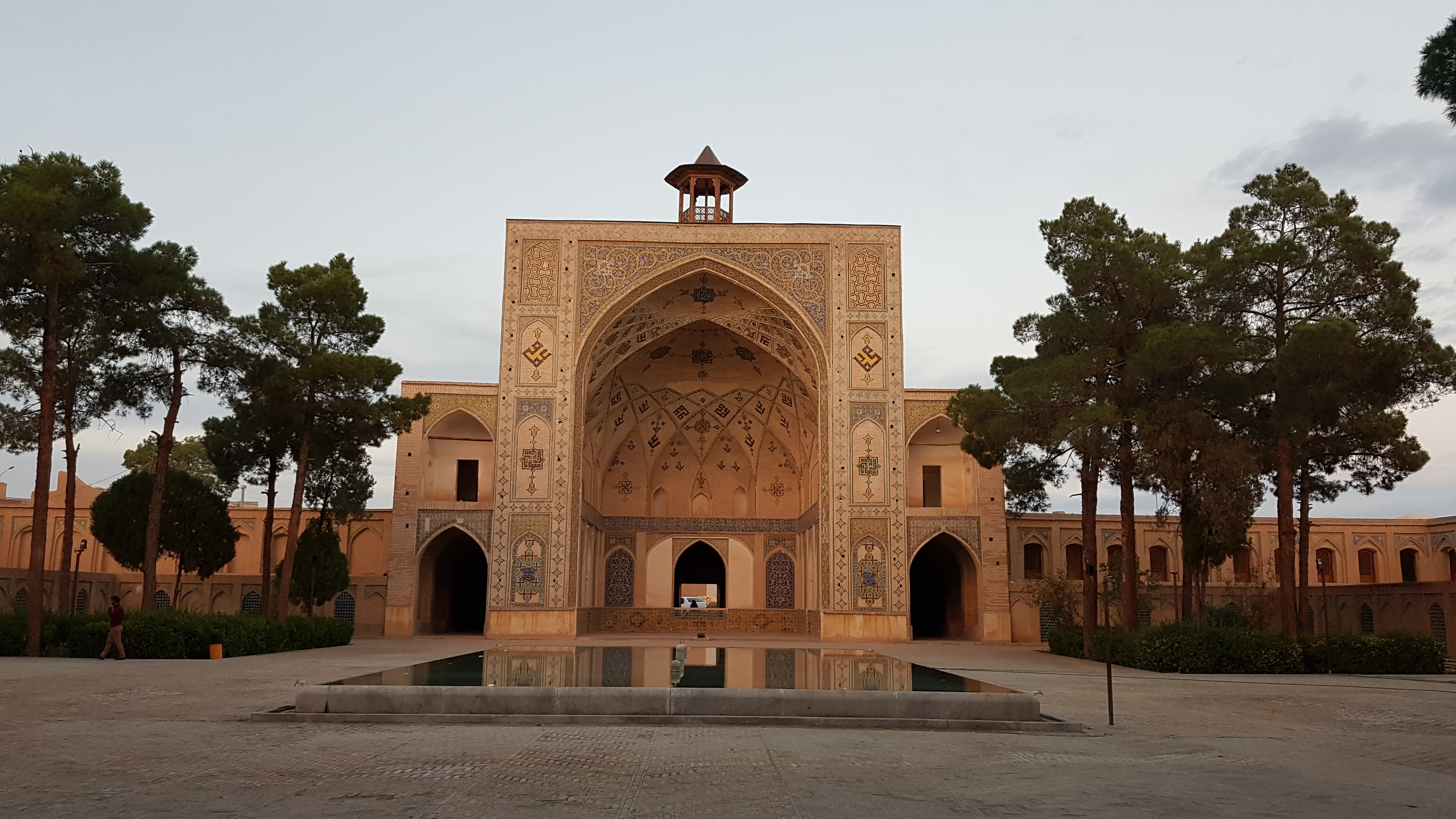
Shah Mosque

=== Historical innovations ===
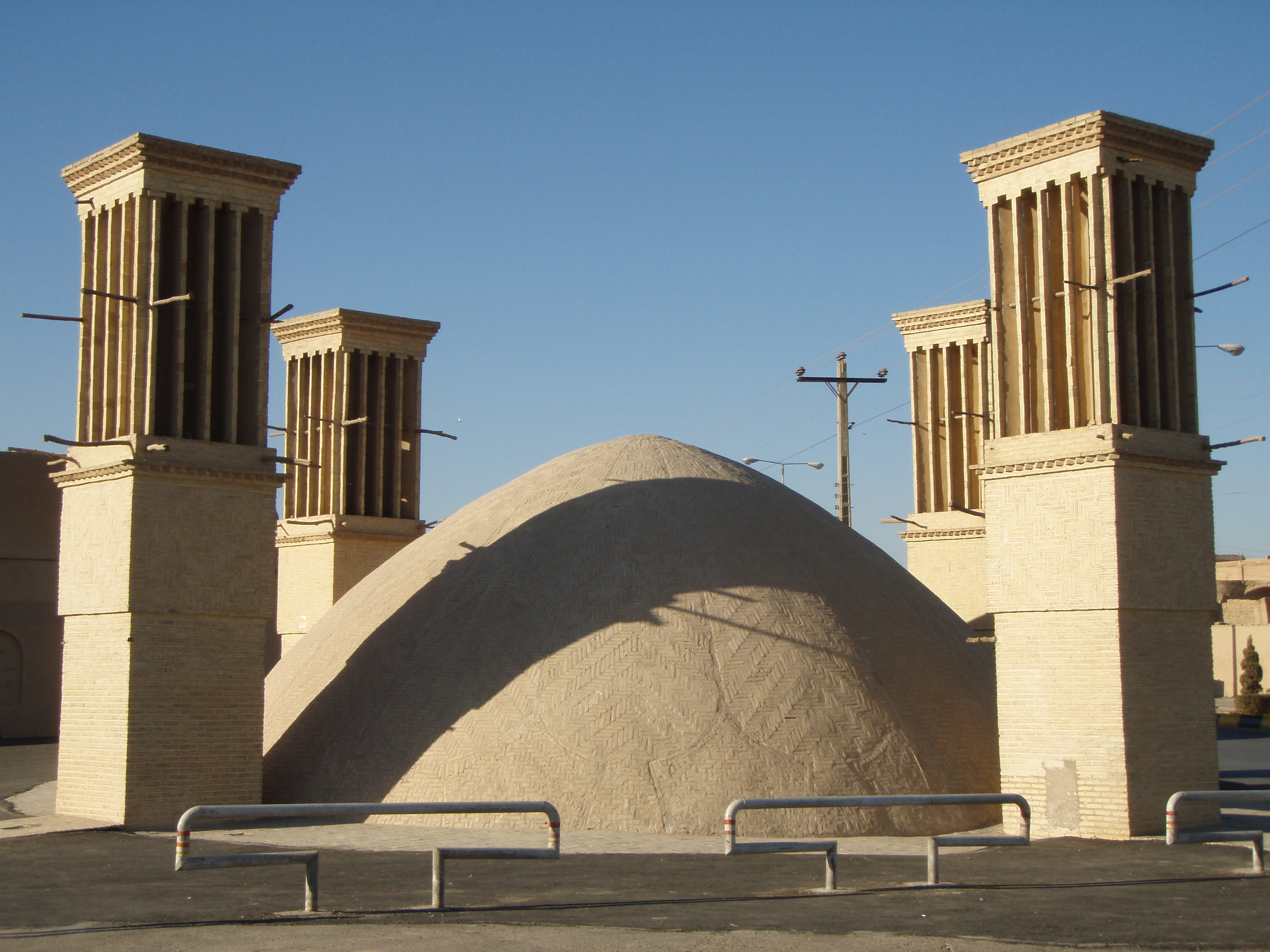
Example of a badgir attached to a cistern of water in Yazd, Iran similar in construct to the ones in Semnan

Semnan's proximity to the Kavir Desert has provided the city with the opportunity to construct numerous facilities in order to cope with the dry climate. As a result, Semnan has numerous ancient, traditional irrigation systems known as qanat. In addition, the roofs of many buildings are decorated with windcatchers known in Persian as badgir. These badgirs were normally attached to a small cistern of drinking water known in Persian as Ab Anbar. These ancient, traditional, and clever designs and systems helped Semnan grow and prosper before the introduction of modern plumbing and appliances. Within the vicinity of the city, ancient caravanserais from the active era of the historic and legendary Silk Road can be found.

== Economy ==
The city of Semnan has traditionally been an important center of commerce along the historical Silk Road, and is still an important agricultural, industrial, and cultural center today.

=== Industrial sector ===
The production of textiles and carpets were the most important industries in the history of the city. But nowadays, in relation to its population, Semnan has very powerful industrial sectors, with special regards to its automobile industry (cars and bikes). Another major industry is the production of cement from the nearby cement plants. The mountains and foothills around Semnan also hold major deposits of minerals used in the production of plaster; these mines are known in Persian as ma'dan e gach. Other minerals that are mined around the city consist of gypsum, salts, zeolite, bentonite, and celestine. Some heavy industries of Semnan consist of the Iran Khodro Semnan Production Plant (producing 100,000 Samand cars per year), Oqab Afshan Production Plant (largest bus production plant in the region of Asia), the Semnan Sodium Carbonate Company (largest in the region of Asia), and the Semnan Rolling Mills Group (major producer of piping and profiles). One of the largest industrial zone in the city is the Semnan Industrial Town, which features 2,100 hectares of land and 900 industrial units.

=== Agricultural sector ===
Agricultural traditions still persist around and within the city of Semnan. The Golrudbar river, which starts in the Alborz mountains in the north, runs through the western side of the city. With proper irrigation, the municipality has managed to convert the entire southwestern portion of the city into green and lush pomegranate gardens. Around the city, further irrigation of the Golrudbar river and the surrounding creeks and tributaries have provided the proper environment for the cultivation of herbs, eggplants, potatoes, walnuts, and cotton.

Semnan also produces handwoven rugs called Glim. These rugs consist of naturally dyed wools, woven into elaborate tribal and local designs.

== Customs and traditions ==
=== Norms ===
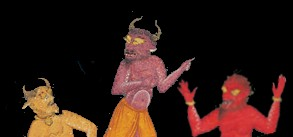
Artistic impression of jinn

- While the validity of the following has not been verified, some Semnani families have reported that the traditional norms and customs of the city called for a high level of respect and prestigious treatment towards the Sayyid population; in return, the Sayyids were expected to demonstrate a dignified source of emulation and guidance for the citizens. If such norms and traditions existed, it is not clear to what extent they are practiced and carried out in today's Semnan.
- It has also been reported that the people of Semnan have historically refused to wear black clothing for the mourning of the dead, this does not include the religious mournings of Muharram or the deaths and martyrdoms of Shi'a imams and figures. The foundation of this refusal appears to be rooted in the hatred of the people of Semnan towards the Abbasid Caliphate and its utilization of black flags.
- Superstitions are highly intertwined with the religious beliefs amongst the older generations in Semnan. One example would be the historical refusal of the local people to travel near the Rig-e Jenn or Dunes of the Jinn while leading trade caravans south towards the Province of Isfahan in the past. The local people believed that evil, demonic spirits lived and dwelled near the sand dunes.
- Traditionally, the women were tasked with baking the oven-baked bread of the city. It is reported that in historical times, the women could make three months worth of bread in one day. Over time, the women responsible for the baking of the bread developed several folksongs that they would sing as they baked. Two famous folksongs are "môr siyô" and "nün bışkán".

=== Muharram traditions ===
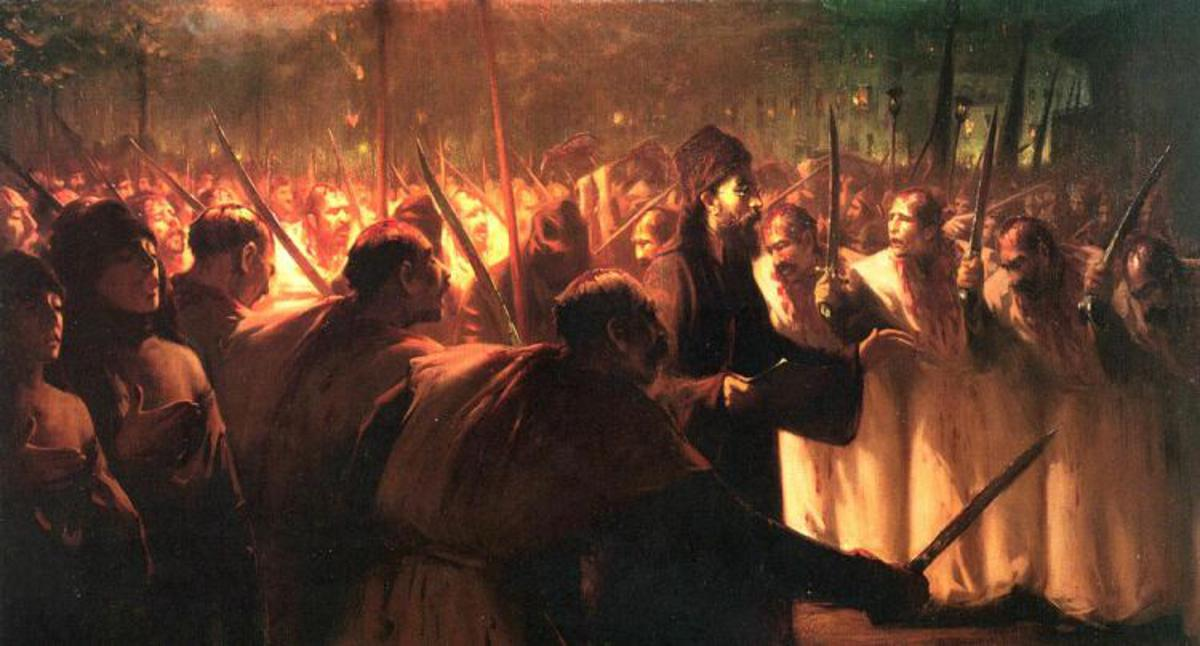
Artistic impression of a historical Ashura mourning ceremony, by Fausto Zonaro (1909)

Muharram is the first month of the Islamic Calendar, and also the month which marks the brutal and tragic martyrdom of the third Shi'a Imam, Imam Hussein and 72 members of his household. The people of Semnan observe Muharram and the overall 50 days of mourning by refraining from worldly pleasures, such as music and joyful gatherings, wearing dark clothes to show intimate grief, and participating in outdoor rallies consisting of massive mourning accompanied by sorrowful chants which recall the events of the tragedy in Karbala, the place of Imam Hussein's martyrdom. In addition, the mournings on the tenth day of Muharram, known as Ashura, consist of self-flagellation rituals in which the participants attempt to symbolically inflict pain upon themselves. Another major event held in Semnan during the month of Muharram is the reenactment of the tragedy of Karbala. Participating locals would wear the armor and clothing of the armies of Imam Hussein and his enemies, as well as decorating the local horses in the cavalry uniform of the era. Thus, the battle would be reenacted. During this month's sorrowful rituals, it is custom to cook a community meal (usually a stew). This is done by placing colossal cauldrons outside upon a source of heat, then, people would take turns stirring the stew until it is ready to be consumed by the community's mourners.

=== Nowrouz traditions ===
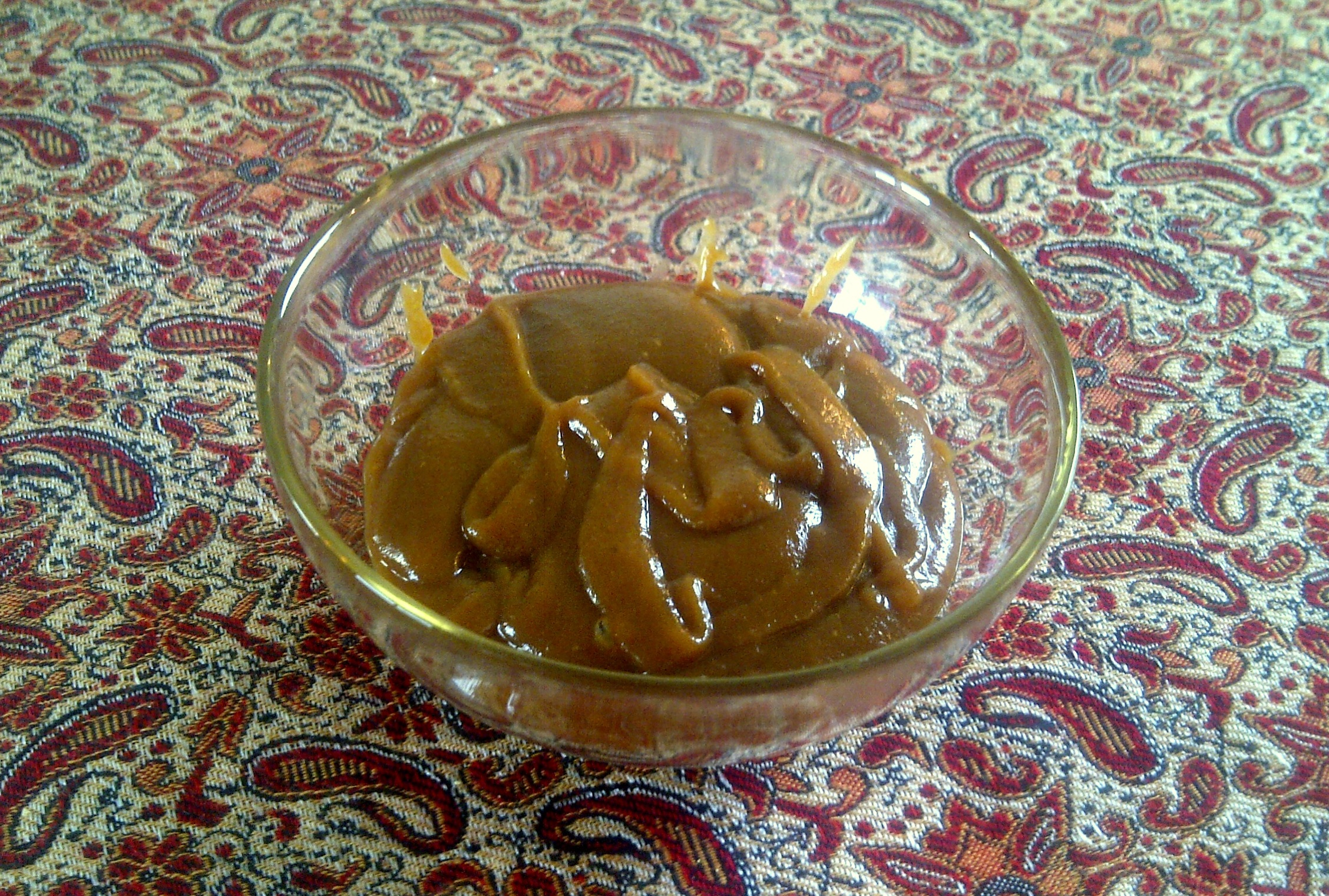
Sample of samanu

The celebrations of Nowrouz are slightly different in the city of Semnan. Since the beginning of the Iranian (Islamic) solar month of Esfand, a man dressed in red with a charcoal-blackened face known as Hajji Firuz sits on top of a wooden horse, decorated with textiles, in the bazaars of Semnan. He congratulates the people and takes part in the establishment of the holiday environment. He sings in the Semnani language: arbaab e mani somboli baleikom, arbaab e mani sarbalaayii hei kon, arbaab e mani bozboz e qandi, arbaab e mani chera nemikhandi.

As the celebrations approach the Nowrouz, many celebrators blacken their faces with charcoal and join the celebrations. Another interesting aspect of the Nowrouz celebrations are the massive gatherings of the womenfolk in which they make covenants with God to cook large batches of samanu for the poor.

== Unique foods and dishes ==
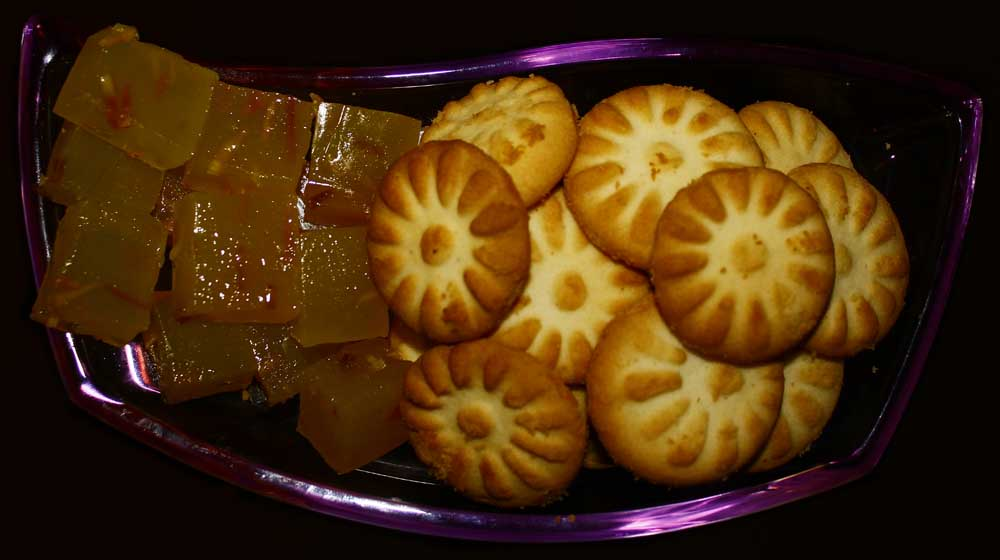
Kolüçe cookies (right) demonstrate the Caspian region's culinary influence on Semnan

The people of Semnan have many foods and dishes that are specific to Semnan. Some of the common ingredients used in Semnani dishes consist of pomegranate extracts, fresh walnuts from Shahmirzad (şômırzé), a variety of greens and herbs known in Persian as sabzijat, and more recently, potatoes. Semnani food tends to be slightly sour and spicey when compared to the general culinary preferences of Tehran. In fact, there is an old proverb among the local people that says, "Semnan has so many foods, that a wife from this city can cook a different dish for every night of the year."

Some of the famous dishes are: Chelo Gousht, Sabzi polo, and Khoresht e Esfanaj va Gerdou (espenôj vu yüz). The Semnani people are also quite fond of a variety of breads such as shirmal, shortbread (kamôç), and Kolüçe pastries. In the Semnani language, bread that is baked in an oven is referred to as "nün," while bread made by other means is referred to as "sôdjí."

The following are the names of some foods in English and Semnani: chicken (gırká), pomegranate (nôr), grapes (engír), cucumber (djürüng), walnut (yüz), eggplant (vıngun), and apricot (şillık).

== Culture ==
=== Poetry ===
Poetry is the most important form of literature in the city of Semnan, especially in terms of its cultural value. Semnani people have contributed greatly to their poetry; they use poetry to express their emotions, philosophies, politics, etc., as well as to preserve the native Semani language. Other poetic works tend to be about God and nature. Also, many books have been published full of traditional poetry. Perhaps the most famous is Nanén Hıkôtí, or Mom's Sayings. Two famous Semnani poets are Zabihullah Andaliba and Rahim Me`marian. The following is an excerpt from a poem about Spring, by Rahim Me`marian, in the Semnani language, along with an English translation:

بییما فصلی بهاری... ماکره دل بیقراری
دو وچش دشت و بیابون... سوزه چی مخملی واری

The Season of Spring has arrived... It sways (the emotions) of the heart,
It spreads across the meadows and the desert... A velvet-like green.
-Rahim Me`marian

=== Short stories ===
There are countless short stories that belong to the Semnani language. Similar to poetry, short stories account for a major section of the literature of Semnan. Due to the previous, little use of orthography, the Semnani language was not able to produce any large single story or novel. Nevertheless, short stories were created to both record history and entertain. These short stories were passed on generation after generation, and have now been recently recorded in books. One famous short story is "frônsé shô vu rüá," or "(The) French King and (the) Cat."

== Media ==
=== Television ===
The city of Semnan receives all the nationwide stations broadcast by IRIB. In addition to the nationwide channels, Semnan is the broadcasting location of Semnan TV, the provincial television station. Semnan TV has made several great achievements in the film and documentary fields. One notable documentary is that of the life of Ali Akbar Moallem Damghani, an Islamic scholar and mystic. Because of the wide variety of dialects spoken throughout the Semnan Province, all of Semnan TV's main broadcasting is in the Persian language in order to avoid the unfair advancement of the city's own dialect. This policy has angered a significant portion of the population which remains deeply concerned with regards to the deteriorating state of the Semnani language altogether.

=== Radio ===
Similar to television, the city of Semnan receives all the national radio frequencies broadcast by IRIB. Due to Semnan's status as the provincial capital, Radio Semnan is based in the city and broadcasts for the entire Semnan Province. Radio Semnan first began to operate in 1976 with the utilization of 10 kilowatts. A few years after the Islamic Revolution, Radio Semnan underwent a major expansion in the year 1981. This provided a variety of broadcasting, i.e. religious, political, recent events, cultural, etc., as well as increasing the broadcasting duration up to fifteen hours per day. Today, Radio Semnan is an important media asset for the entire Semnan Province, and serves as a major source of reliable information and discussions from a wide variety of topics. According to the representative of Radio Semnan, Abdulreza Dehrouye, "the variety of regional dialects, the strategic geographical location, the good climate, the contributions of the educated elite, the centers of industry and mineral extraction, the various university complexes, the massive labor force, and the highly literate and educated municipal population are all contributing factors into establishing the framework of the great and spiritual network Radio Semnan offers today." Furthermore, Radio Semnan is unique in offering broadcast time in which residents may call in and engage in direct dialogue with city representatives and officials. This provides the people as well as city officials the opportunity to address general public concerns and discuss future plans.

=== Newspapers ===
In addition to the numerous nationwide newspapers such as "hamshahri" and "Jomhuri ye Eslami", Semnan publishes many of its own newspapers as well as newspapers for other major cities throughout the Semnan Province. These newspapers consist of:

- the daily "Payam e Ostan e Semnan" (Message of the Semnan Province)
- the weekly "Kavir" (Salt Marsh)
- the weekly "Ham Nazar" (Comments)
- the weekly "Javane ye Emrouz" (Daily Sprout)
- the weekly "Shahvar" (Kingly)
- the bi-weekly "Payam e Shahroud" (Message of Shahroud)
- the monthly "Zofor" (Victory)
- the monthly "Chafiyye" (Keffiyeh)
- the monthly "Chante" (Wallet)
- the "Journal" of the College of Anthropology of the University of Semnan
- the monthly "Healthcare Newsletter" of the Semnan Center of Health

The city's extensive online newspaper can be accessed at www.semnannews.com. The Islamic Republic News Agency also features a provincial news outlet dedicated to the Semnan Province.

== Transportation ==
=== Airports and aviation ===
The city is served by both the Semnan Municipal Airport (IATA: SNX, ICAO: OIIS) and New Semnan Airport (ICAO: OI21).

=== Railways ===
The city is served by the Semnan Railway Station, which features double rails and services to the major cities of Tehran (Westward) and Mashad (Eastward). In addition to services to Tehran and Mashad, there are separate railway services to the cities of Garmsar, Shahrud, Damghan, Meyami, and Sorkheh, all within the Province of Semnan. The Semnan Railway Station features modern electric rail services as well.

The city is further served by the Semnan Municipal Train system which connects the major points of the city by rail. This train service resembles the light rail transit systems that serve several cities throughout the Western world.

=== Other transportation services ===
Semnan also offers an extensive bus route throughout the entire municipality as well as numerous public and private taxi services. Similar to most cities in Iran, Semnan has a particular taxi service referred to in Persian as "agence." This originally French word is used to denote taxis that arrive at the individual's place of residence and provide service to the individual's destination. This form of service varies from the regular taxi services in Semnan, which only operate on pre-assigned routes.

== Higher education ==
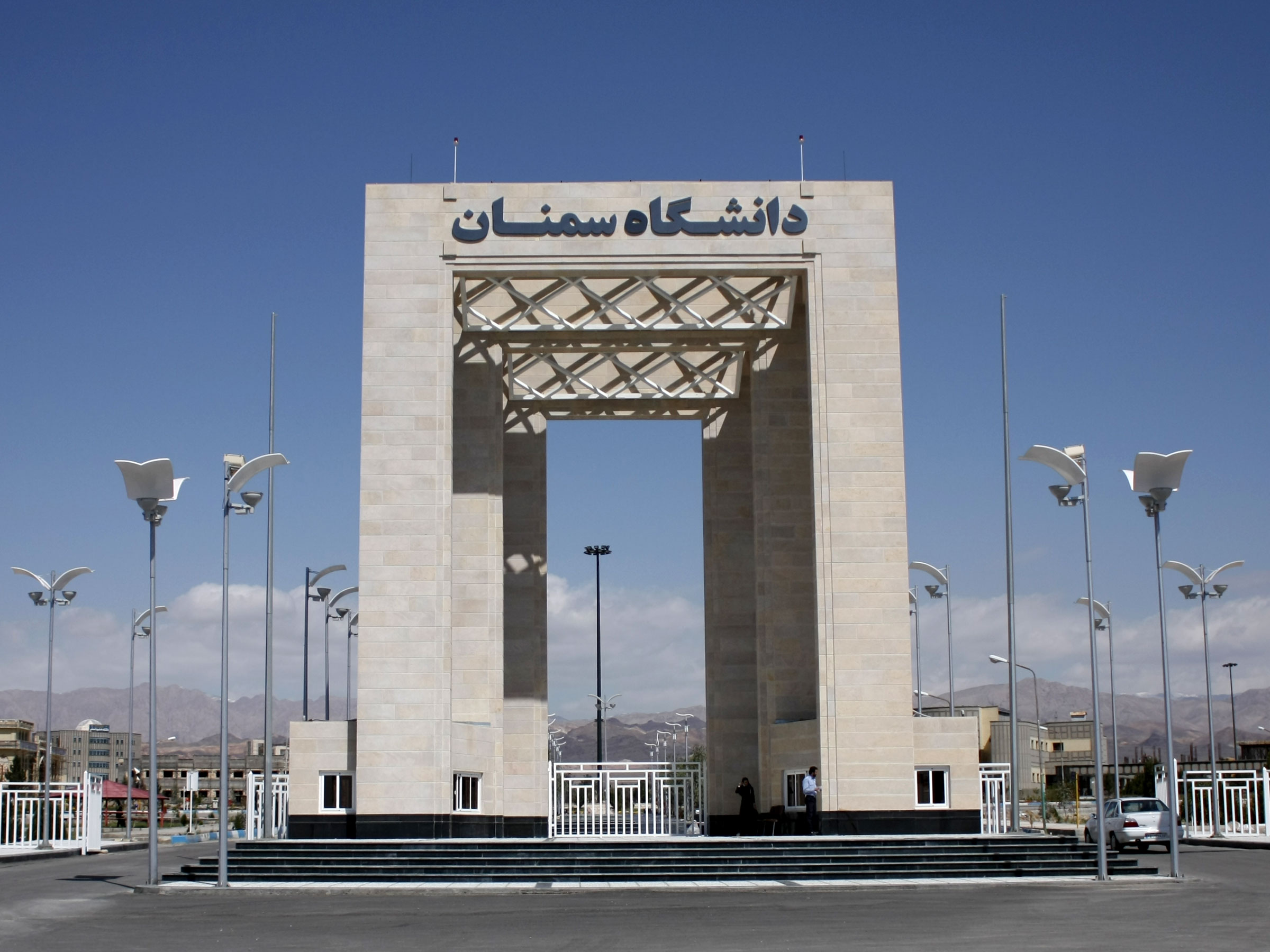
An entrance to the Semnan University campus

Around 99% of all of Semnan's residents are literate. As a result, many residents seek higher education and high level services such as medical, pharmacological, and high-tech engineering professions.

Some of the major centers of higher education are:

- Semnan University
- Semnan University of Medical Sciences
- Gastrointestinal and Liver Diseases Research Center, Semnan University of Medical Sciences
- Islamic Azad University of Semnan
- Payame Noor University
- University of Imam Hosseyn
- University of Shaheed Abbasspour

The University of Industry of Semnan is another planned, future university.

== Notable people ==
- Ala ud-Daula Simnani (1261-1336) - poet
- Ashraf Jahangir Semnani (1287-1386) - Sufi saint
- Nematollah Nassiri (1911-1979) - head of SAVAK
- Nosratollah Noohian (born 1931) - poet
- Shapoor Gharib (born 1933) - film director
- Parviz Sabeti (born 1936) - security officer
- Hassan Rouhani (born 1948) - 7th president of Iran
- Majid Derakhshani (born 1957) - musician
- Farhad Rahbar (born 1959) - politician
- Ahmad Khatami (born 1960) - politician
- Mostafa Kavakebian (born 1963) - politician
- Mojtaba Shaban (born 1987) - volleyball player

=== Photo gallery ===
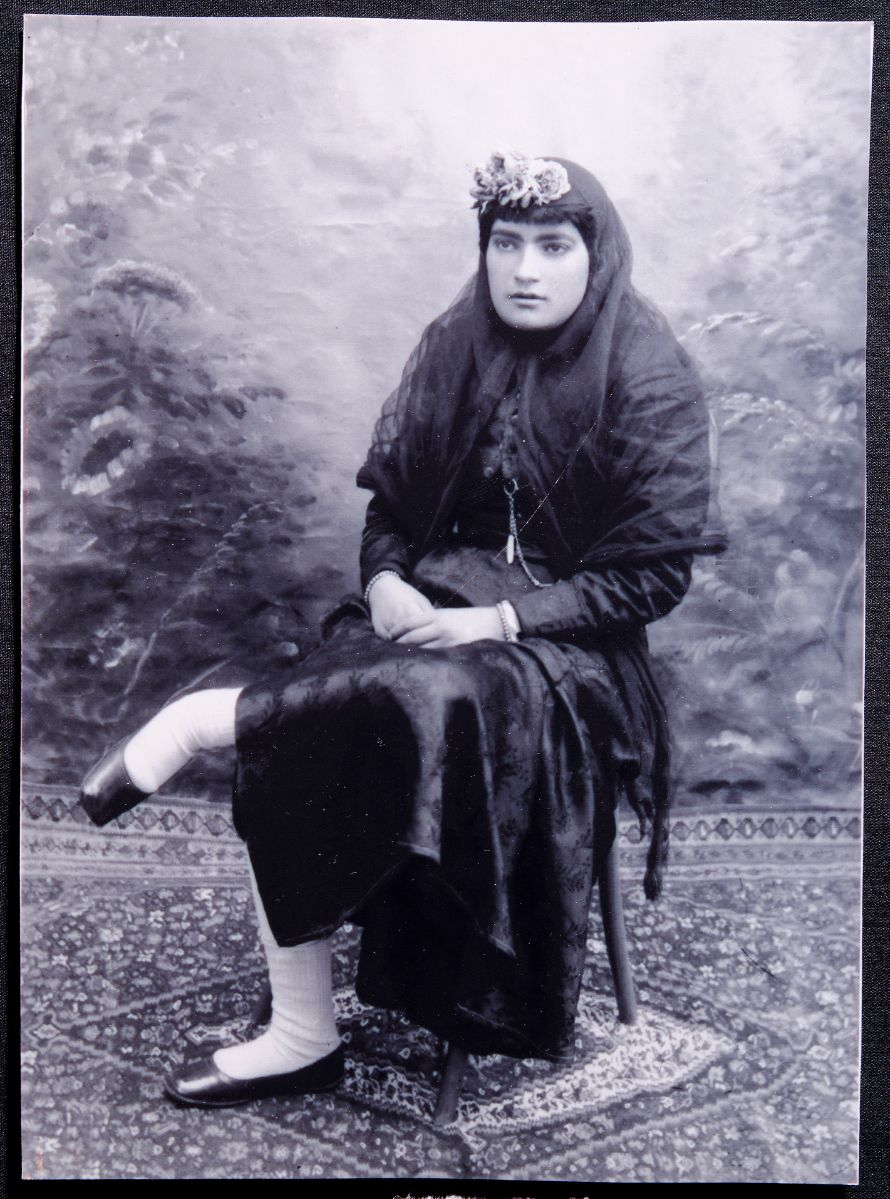
Maryam Amid Semnani Mozayyan As-Saltaneh

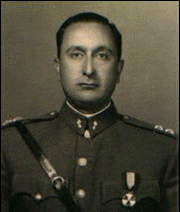
Nematollah Nassiri

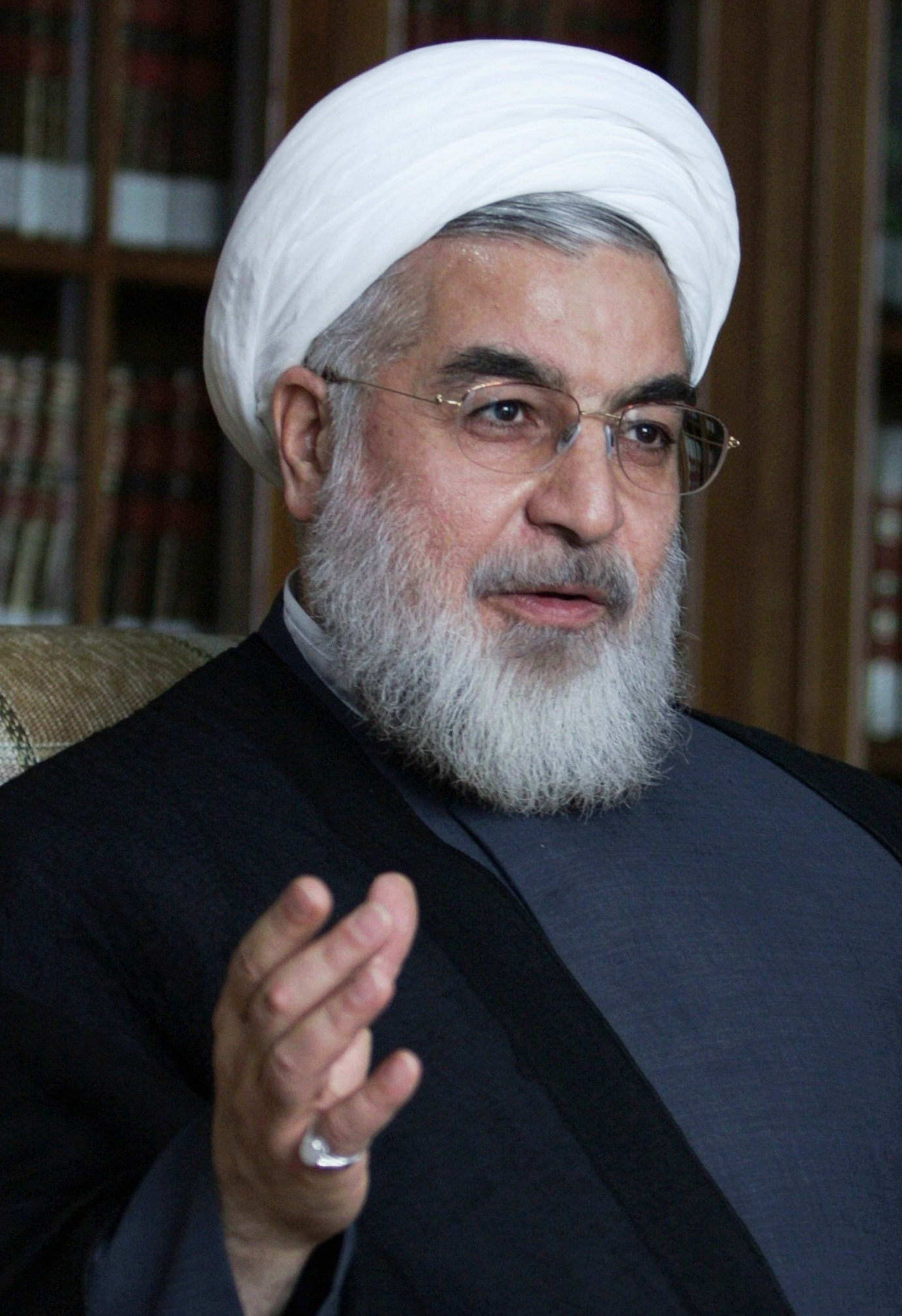
Hassan Rouhani

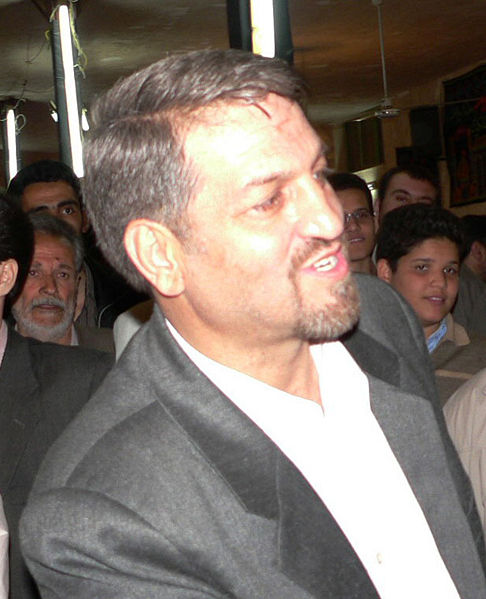
Mostafa Kavakebian

== See also ==
Media related to Semnan at Wikimedia Commons

- The Clouds Forest
