= New Semnan Airport =

Airport in Semnan, Iran

- IATA: none; ICAO: OI21

Summary
- Airport type: Public
- Owner: Government of Iran
- Operator: Iran Airports Company
- Location: Semnan, Semnan Province, Iran
- Elevation AMSL: 1,115 m / 3,658 ft
- Coordinates: 35°23′20″N 053°40′19″E

Map
- Location of airport in Iran

Runways
Direction	Length		Surface
Direction	m	ft	Surface
06/24	3,578	11,739	Asphalt
- Source: World Aero Data

New Semnan Airport (ICAO: OI21) is an airport serving the city of Semnan, in the Semnan Province of Iran. It is located within the Semnan Air Defense Base and is mainly used for military purposes. In particular, it features the Islamic Republic of Iran's most active pilot training and simulation facilities. The facility also includes an aerospace research center.
