= Imam Mosque, Semnan =

Mosque in Semnan, Semnan Province, Iran

Shah Mosque of Semnan
- مسجد شاه سمنان
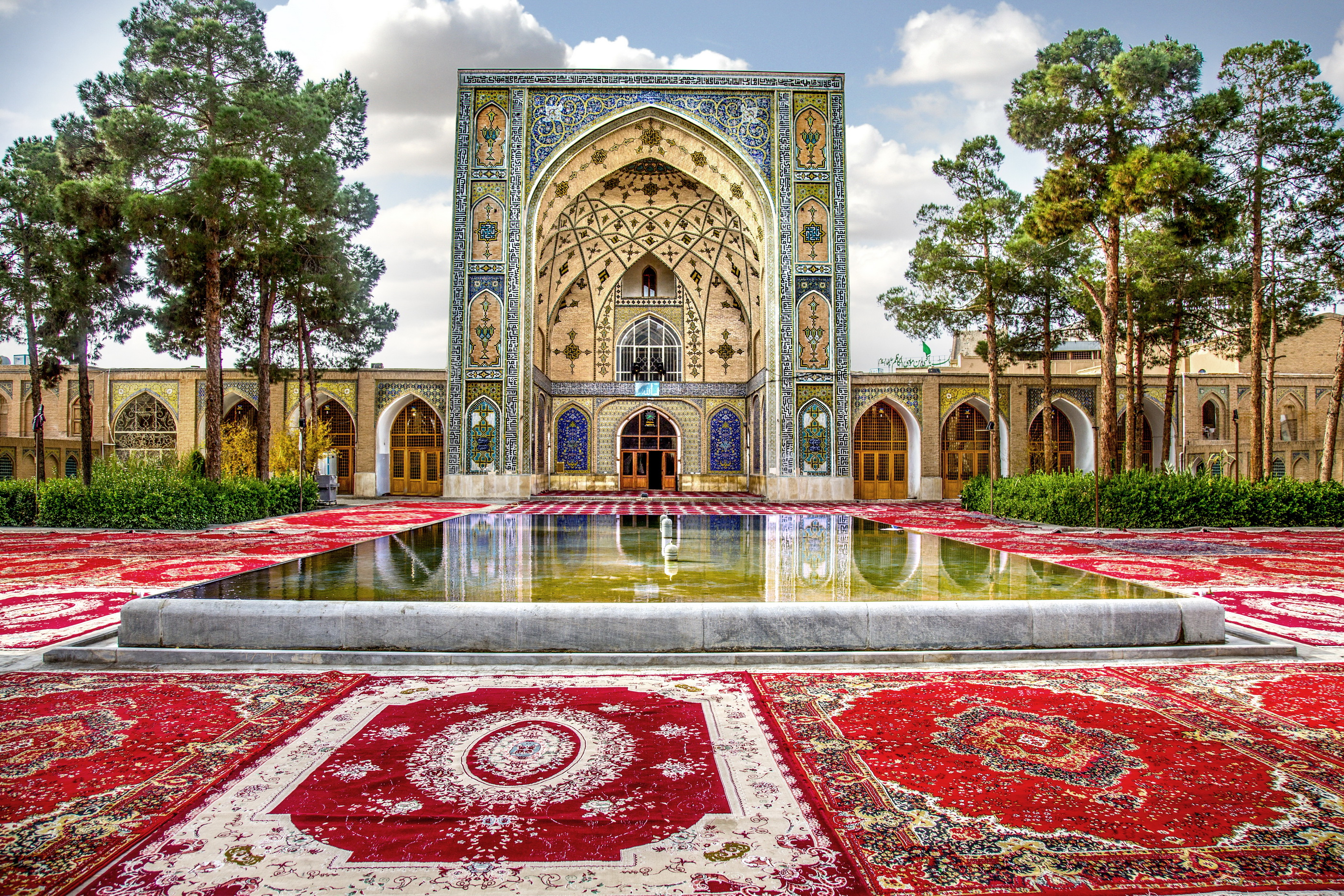
- The mosque in 2018. Colorful jānamāz surround the sahn

- Location of the mosque in Iran

Religion
- Affiliation: Shia Islam
- Ecclesiastical or organisational status: Mosque
- Status: Active

Location
- Location: Emam Street, Semnan, Semnan Province
- Country: Iran
- Coordinates: 35°33′59″N 53°24′3″E

Architecture
- Type: Mosque architecture
- Style: Qajar
- Founder: Abbas the Great
- Groundbreaking: 1612 CE
- Completed: 1324 AH (1906/1907 CE)

Specifications
- Domes: c. 40 (maybe more, most small)
- Inscriptions: Two (maybe more)
- Materials: Bricks; plaster; tiles; marble

Iran National Heritage List
- Official name: Shah Mosque of Semnan
- Type: Mosque
- Designated: 1955
- Reference no.: 393
- Conservation organization: Cultural Heritage, Handicrafts and Tourism Organization of Iran

The Imam Mosque of Semnan (Persian: مسجد شاه (سمنان), romanized: Masji-e Shah), also known as the Soltani Mosque, (Note: Other names include the Semnan Central Mosque, the Masjid-e Shah or Royal Mosque (formerly), the Abbasi Jāme Mosque, and the Semnan Jāme Mosque.) is a mosque located in the city of Semnan, Semnan province, Iran.

Commenced in 1612 CE and completed in 1324 AH (1906/1907 CE), (Note: With one claim that the mosque was completed in 1828 CE.) during the Qajar era, the mosque is an example of architecture, stone carving, and tile work in Iran. The mosque was added to the Iran National Heritage List on 20 June 1936, administered by the Cultural Heritage, Handicrafts and Tourism Organization of Iran.

== Architecture ==
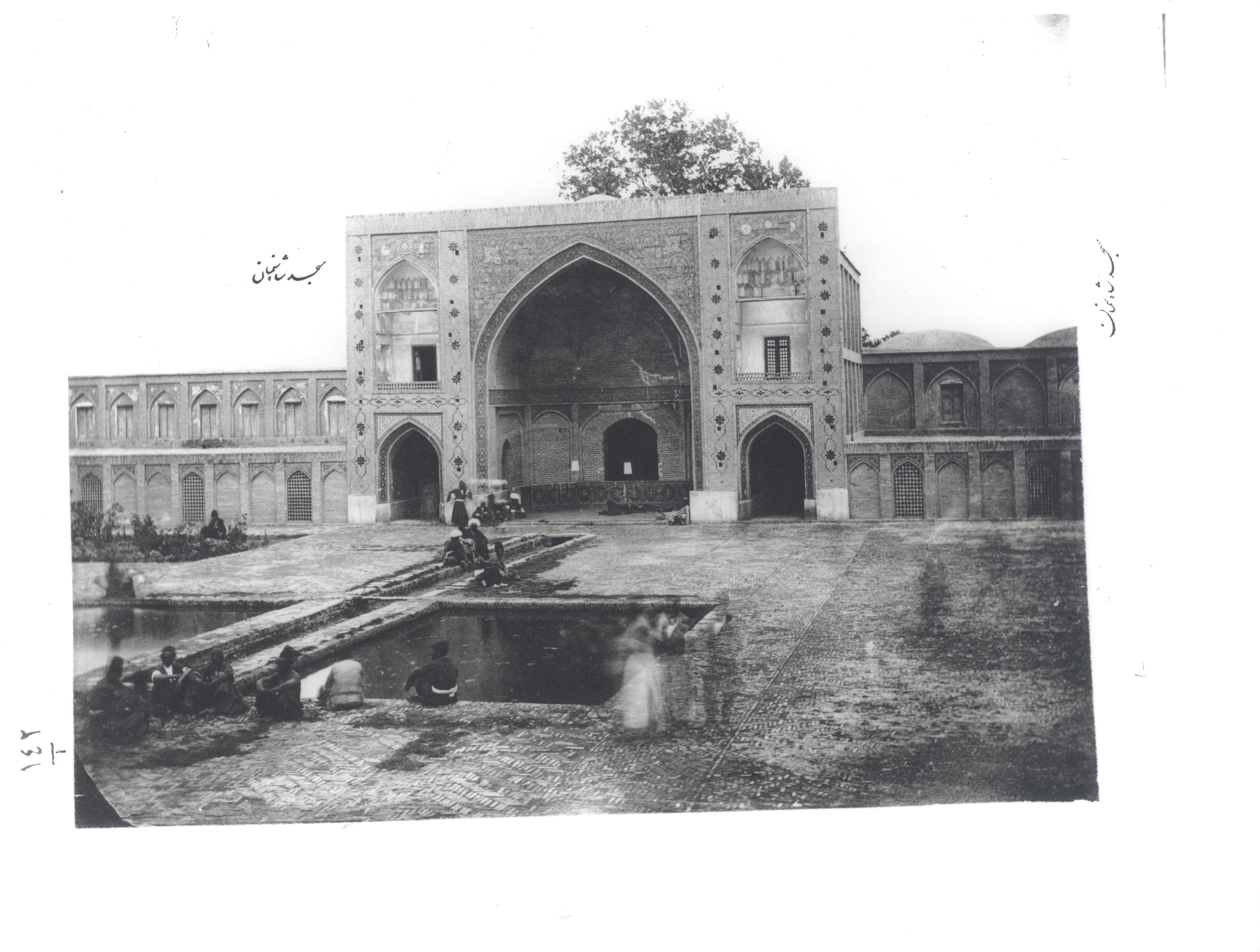
Photograph of the mosque by Aqa Reza Akasbashi, 19th century

Construction of the mosque commenced in 1612 CE during the reign of Abbas the Great and is one of several mosques commissioned by the Shah in a similar style. The mosque is considered a magnificent example of architecture, stone carving, and tile work in Iran, with a majesty and splendour that places it among the world's greatest buildings.

The mosque was designed on a four-iwan courtyard style. The doors to the northern, southern and eastern sides have a vestibule (usually octagonal in shape) and corridors. The upper portion of the northern and eastern doors are arched and artistically worked in plaster and tile with beautiful Muqarnas. The ceilings of the vestibules, on the north, south, and eastern sides are constructed of bricks, and are dome-shaped with numerous arches and designed with tiles. There are four porches on four sides along with an area for nocturnal prayers. Behind the western porch is an inscription revealing the final date of construction. The northern entrance has a Persian blue tile inscription under which a slab of marble with a poem inscribed in Nastaliq script.

Beside the altar, the marble Mihrab has eleven steps and there are two unfinished minarets. On the top of western porch is a small dome adorned with blue tiles. There is also a tiled inscription from the Quran, all around the western porch worked in white tiles on a blue tiled background. The sahn contains a pool and flowerbeds. After the 1979 Iranian revolution, the mosque was repaired by the Cultural Heritage Organization.

== Gallery ==
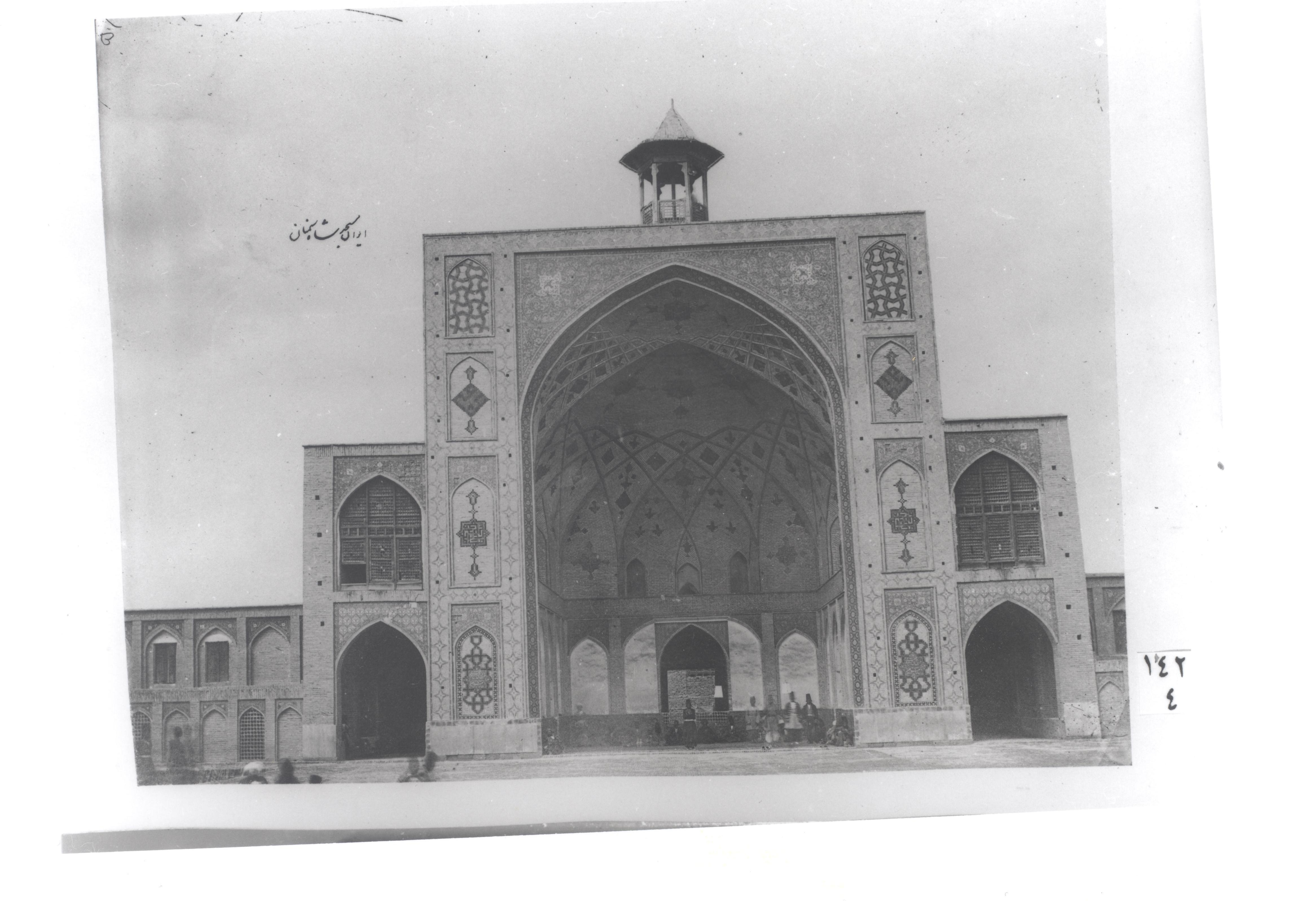
Photograph of the mosque by Aqa Reza Akasbashi, 19th century

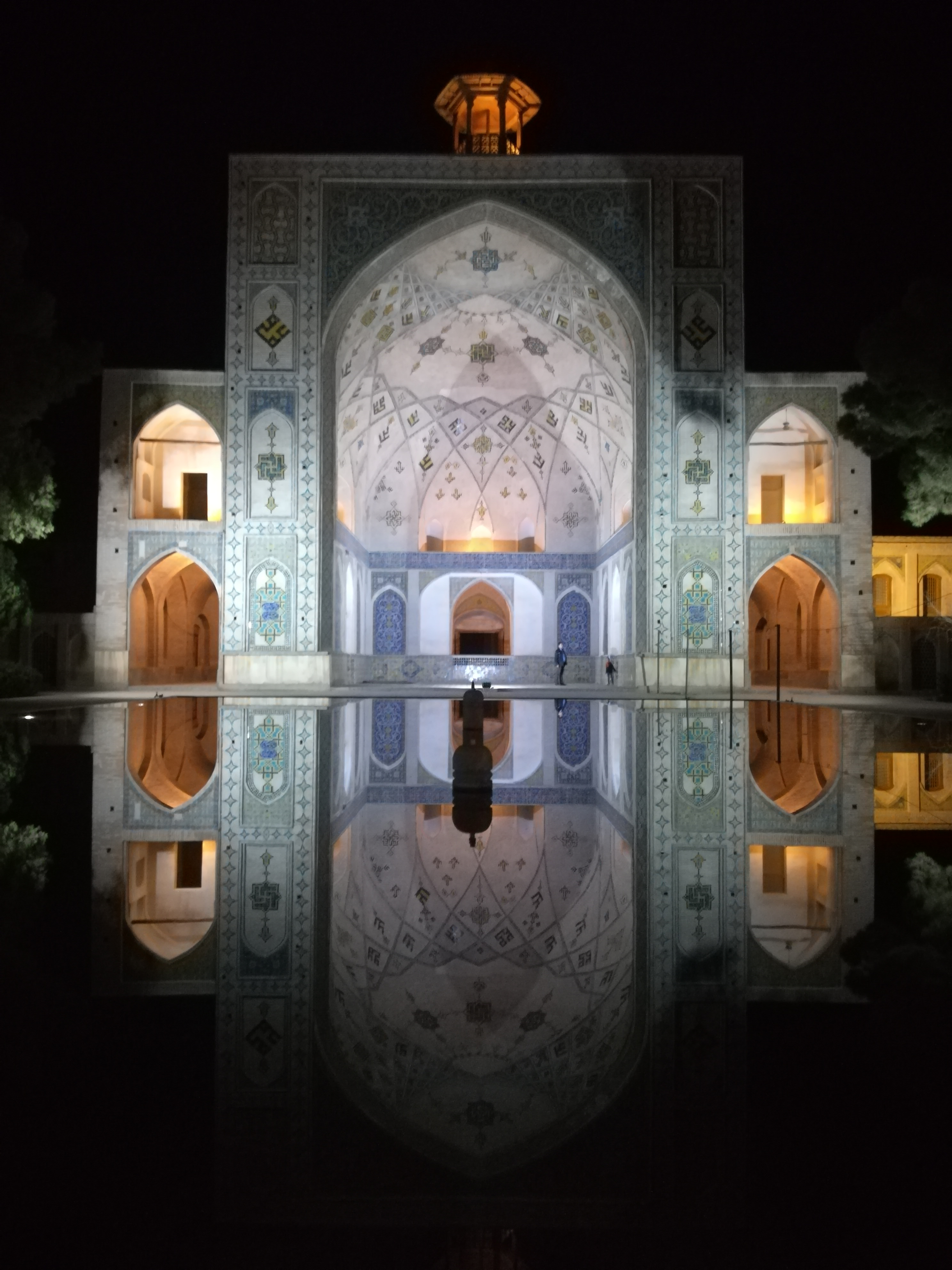
A view across the pool at night

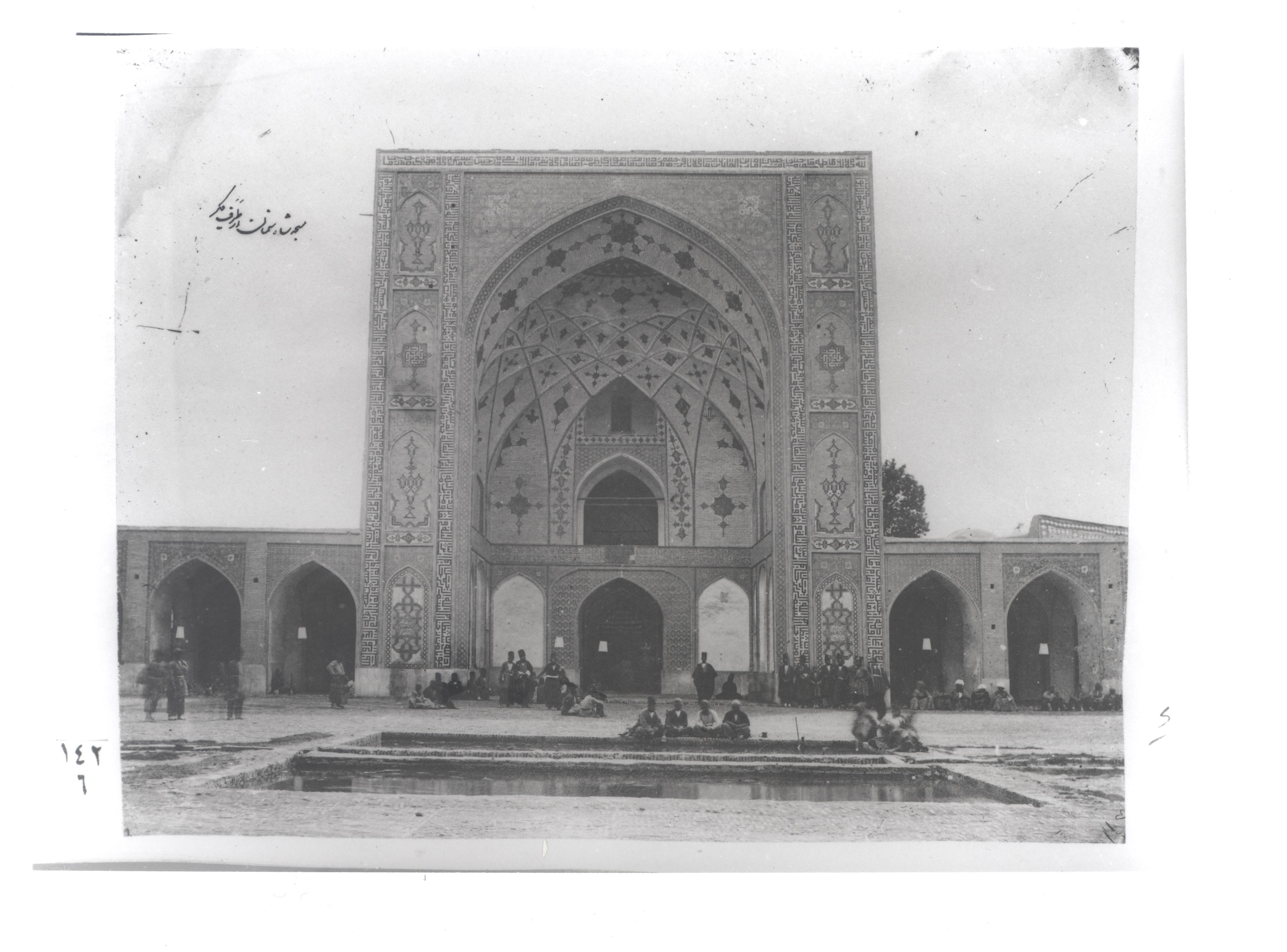
Photograph of the mosque by Aqa Reza Akasbashi, 19th century

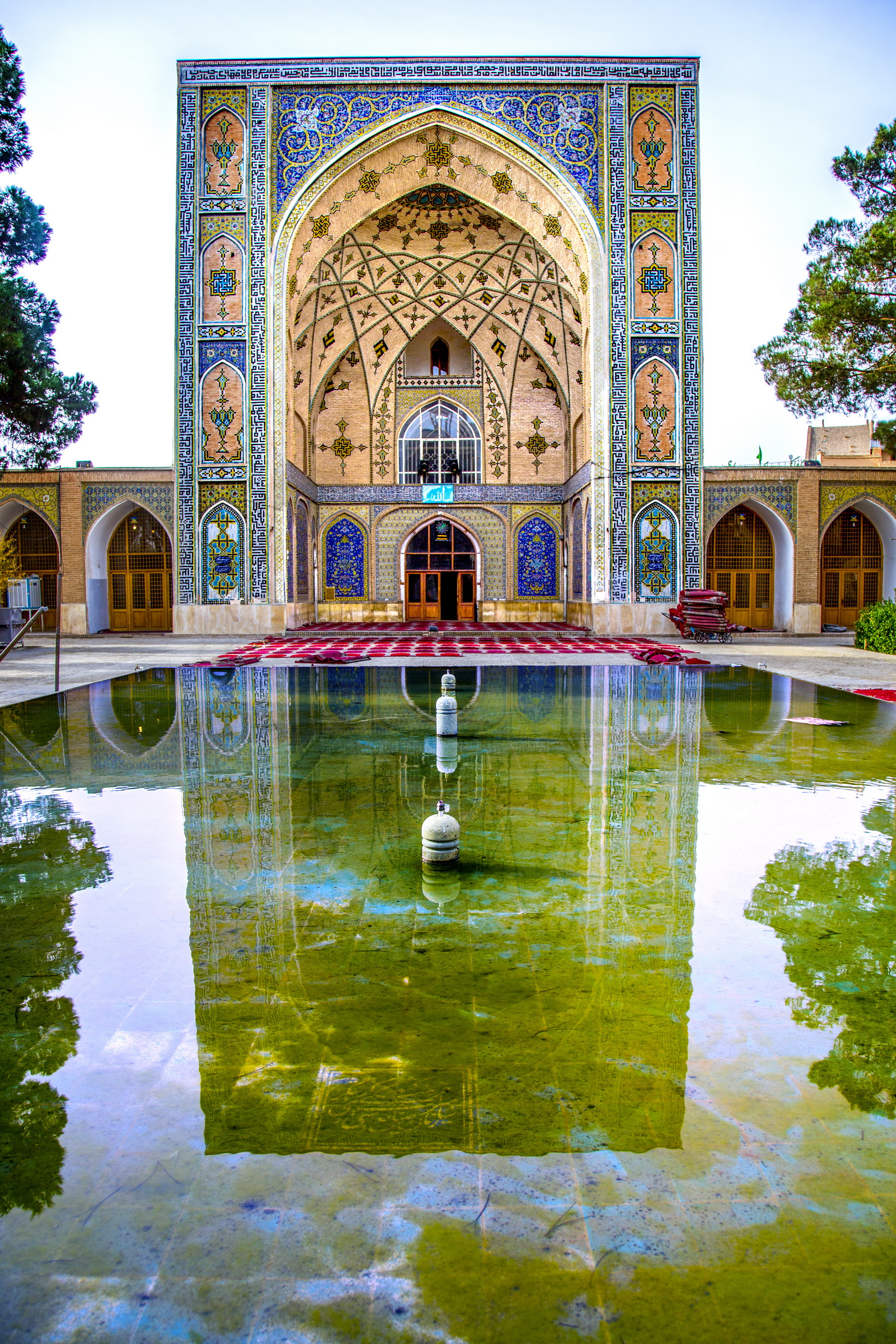
Looking across the sahn to an iwan

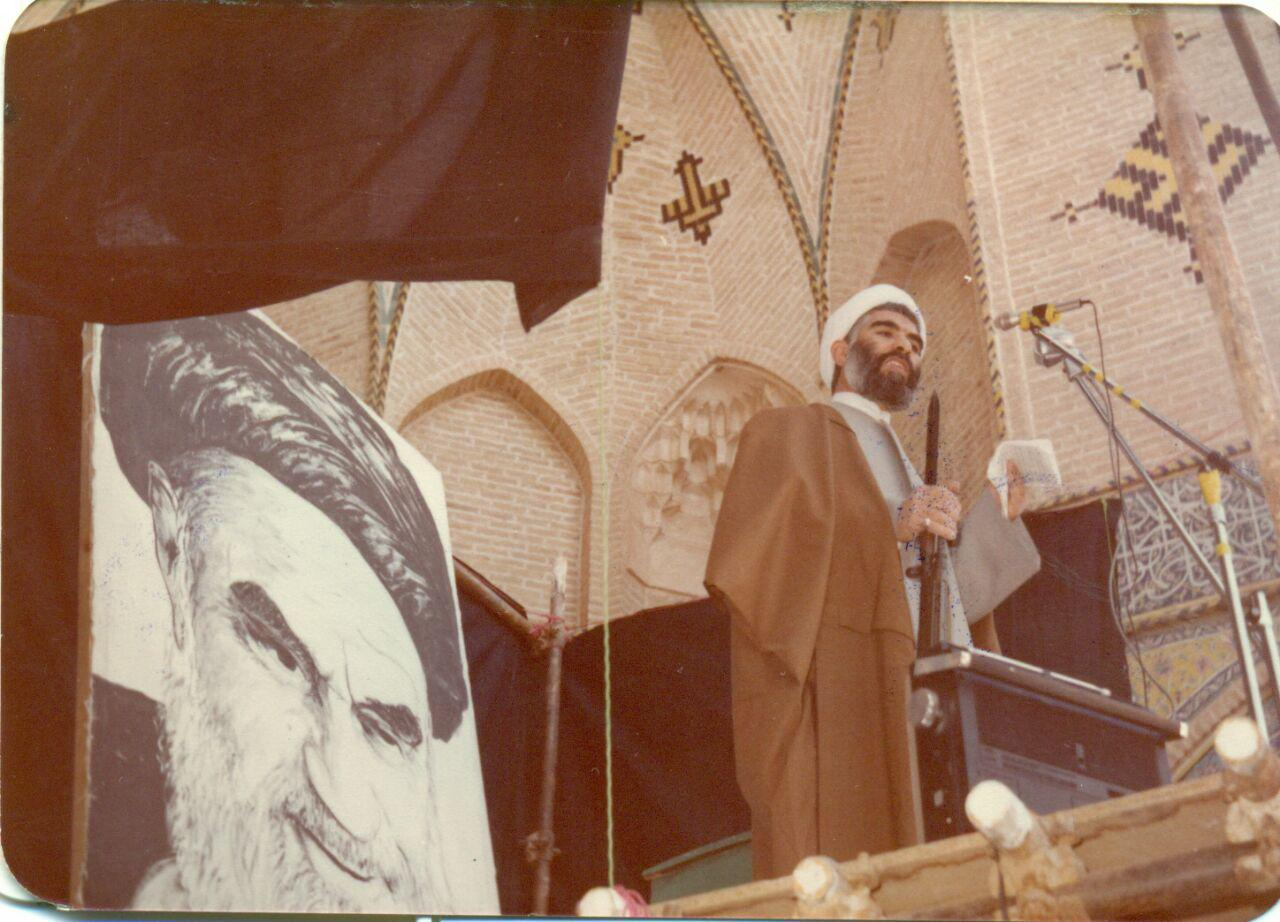
Sheikh Abbas Ali Akhtari leading Friday prayers at the mosque in 1981, adjacent to an image of Ruhollah Khomeini

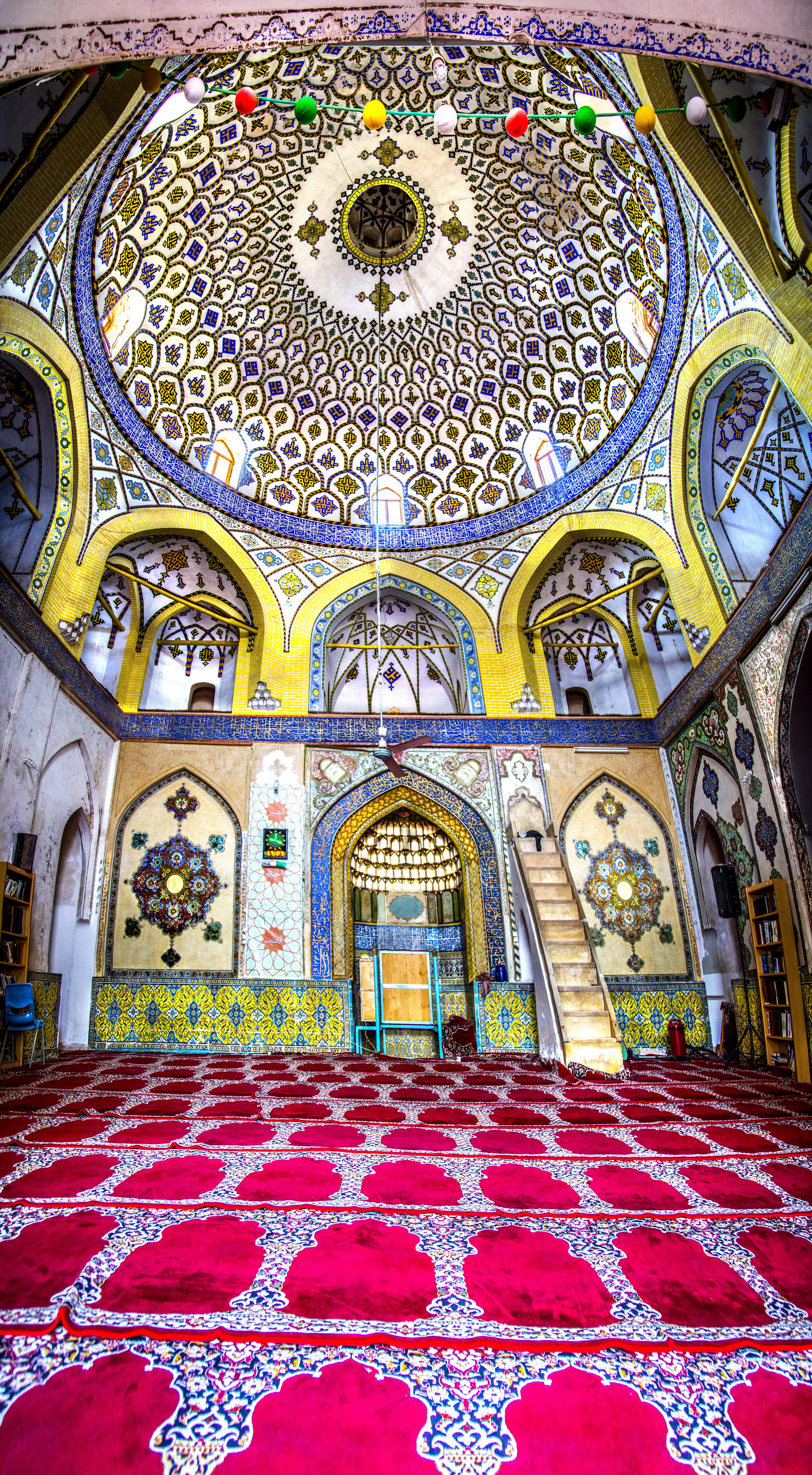
Stunning interior of the prayer hall with qibla wall

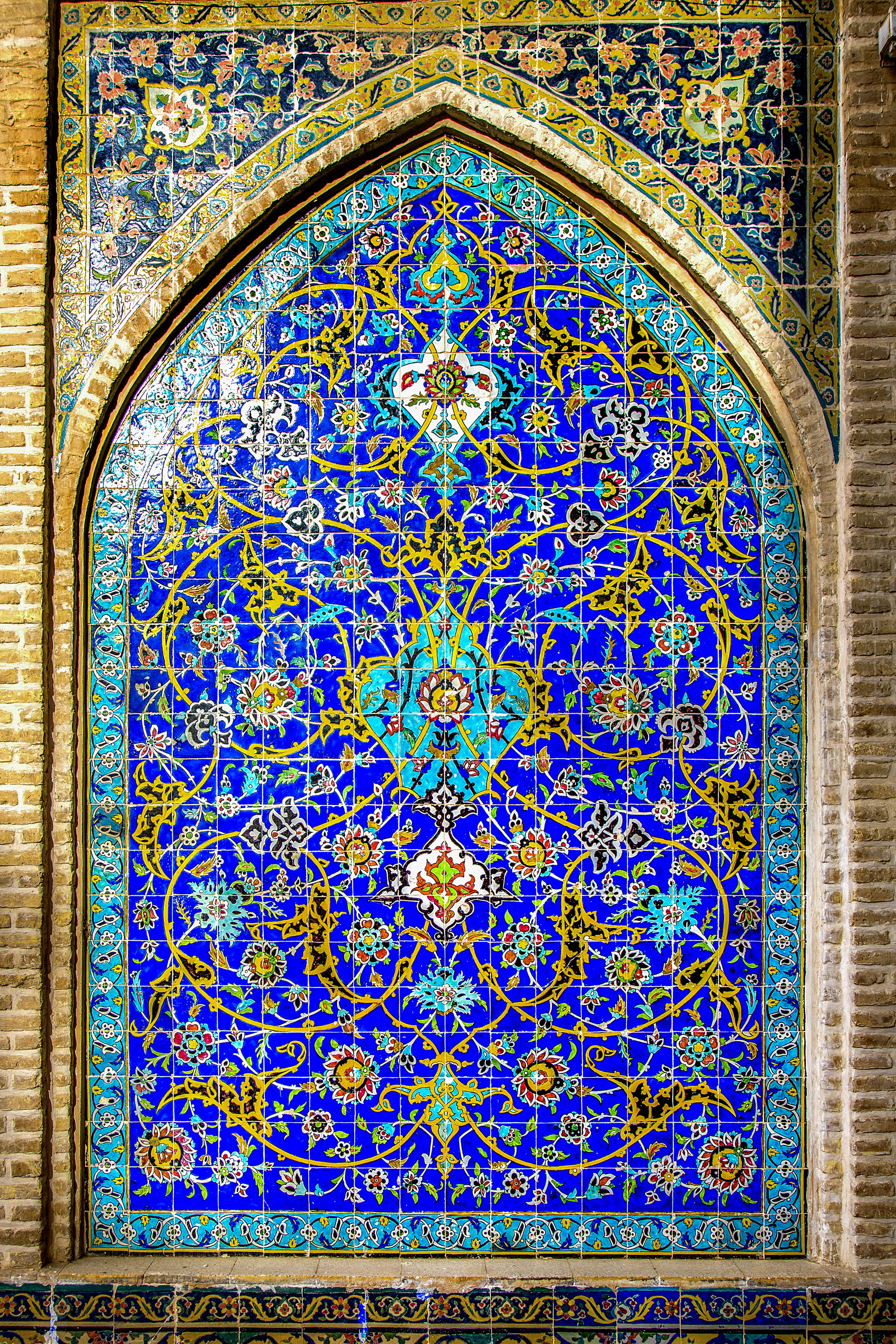
Detailed tile design of an iwan wall

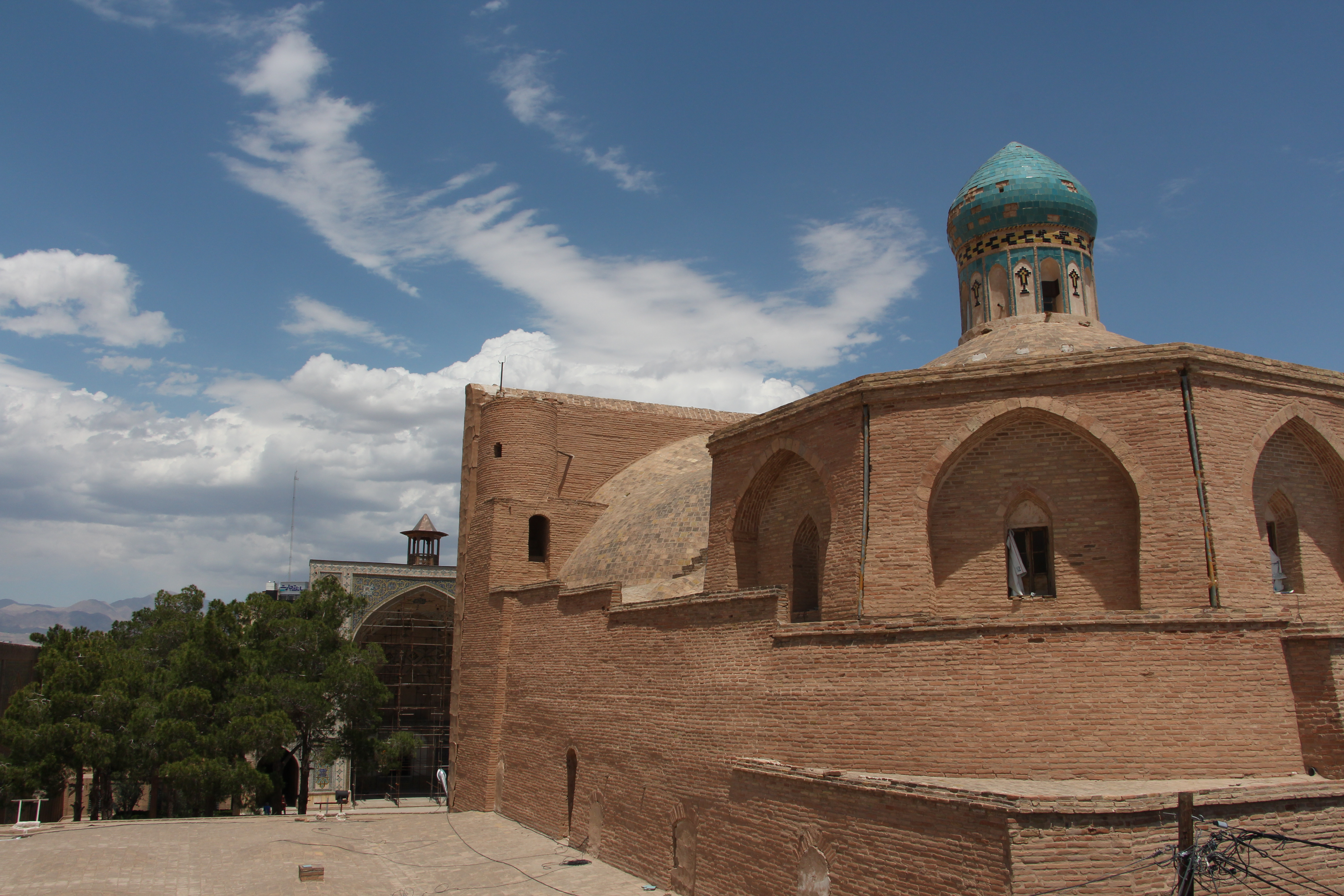
Exterior of the mosque with its unusual small dome on the western porch

== See also ==
- Shia Islam in Iran
- List of mosques in Iran
