= Jameh Mosque of Semnan =

Mosque in Semnan, Semnan province, Iran

Jāmeh Mosque of Semnan
- مسجد جامع سمنان
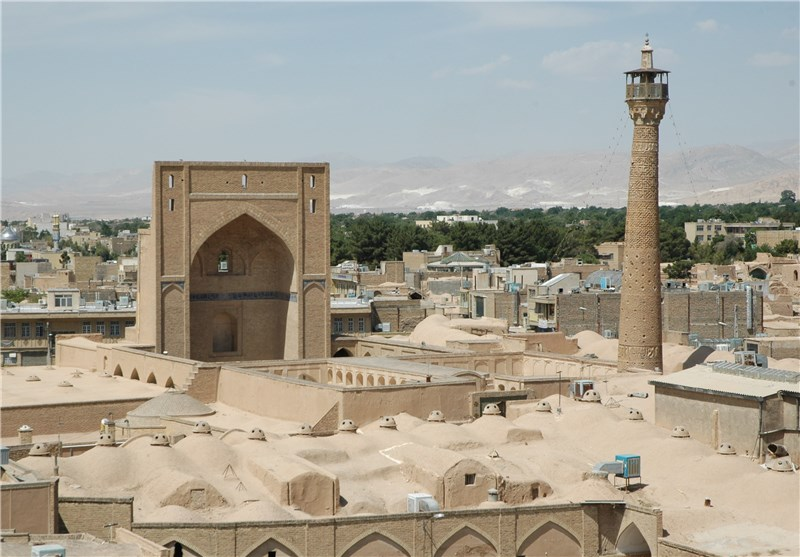
- The mosque in 2019

- Location of the mosque in Iran

Religion
- Affiliation: Shia Islam
- Ecclesiastical or organisational status: Friday mosque
- Status: Active

Location
- Location: Semnan, Semnan Province
- Country: Iran
- Coordinates: 35°33′39″N 53°23′57″E

Architecture
- Architect: Khajeh Abu Saeid (dome)
- Type: Mosque architecture
- Style: Umayyad (original structure); Seljuk (minaret, dome, NW shebastan); Ilkhanid (SE shabestan); Timurid (NE shabestan); Safavid (renovation); Qajar (renovation)
- Completed: 7th century CE (original); c. 1030s CE (mosque); 1280s CE (SE shabestan); 1425 CE (NE shabestan); 1555 CE (renovation); 1695 CE (renovation); 19th century CE (renovation); 1957 CE (renovation)

Specifications
- Dome: One (maybe more)
- Minaret: One
- Minaret height: 28.5 m (94 ft)
- Materials: Bricks; plaster; tiles

Iran National Heritage List
- Official name: Friday Mosque of Semnan
- Type: Friday Mosque and Minaret
- Designated: 1932
- Reference no.: 163 and 162
- Conservation organization: Cultural Heritage, Handicrafts and Tourism Organization of Iran

The Jāmeh Mosque of Semnan (Persian: مسجد جامع سمنان, romanized: Masjed-e Jameh-e Semnan; Arabic: جامع سمنان) is a Shi'ite Friday mosque (jāmeh), located in the city of Semnan, (Note: Sometimes spelled as Simnan.) in the province of Semnan, Iran. It is believed that this mosque was built in the 5th century AH (11th century CE) on the ruins of a fire temple. Subsequently, there have been many changes and developments to the mosque structure, with traces of the Seljuq and Timurid eras most notable.

Both the Seljuk style mosque and its minaret were added to the Iran National Heritage List on 6 January 1932, administered by the Cultural Heritage, Handicrafts and Tourism Organization of Iran.

== History ==
Sana' al-Dawla wrote in the book Mirror of the Lands: during the caliphate of Ali ibn Abi Talib, he ordered that 1001 mosques be built from Kufa to Bukhara. During the rule of Abdullah ibn Umar, the wealthy people of Semnan built the present mosque of this city, but the building did not have much splendor at that time.

The mosque is one of the earliest mosques built in Iran. An inscription on its minaret states that it was constructed during the governorship of Abu Harb Bakhtiar ibn Muhammad, dating it to between 417 AH (1026/1027 CE) and 426 AH (1034/1035 CE), making the minaret the oldest extant part of the mosque complex. The mosque was later expanded during the Ilkhanate and Timurid periods.

== Architecture ==
The mosque is situated inside the city bazaar, and its main entrance is on the north side from Imam Street. Another entrance is found on the east side from the bazaar. Rectangular in plan, the mosque is oriented southwest–northeast and centers on a 25-by-27-metre (82 by 89 ft) sahn. Each side of the sahn has a different plan. On the west side sits a large qibla iwan leading onto a domed chamber. The three other sides are occupied by hypostyle prayer halls of varying layouts. The minaret is located in the northeast corner.

The qibla iwan is made of brick and measures 21 metres (69 ft) high by 105 metres (344 ft) wide. Its inscription indicates that it was built in 828 AH (1424/1425 CE) by a Timurid minister. The dome chamber behind the iwan is 14.5 metres (48 ft) high. The mihrab is located on the western wall of this hall.

The prayer hall on the southeastern side of the sahn is three aisles wide and nine bays deep, with a mihrab on its western wall. Sixteen columns support it. An inscription dates this space to the reign of Arghun Khan. The prayer hall on the northeastern side of the sahn is square in plan and rests on sixteen columns in four rows of four. At the back of the hall, one of the bays is closed off into an octagonal vestibule from which the entry from the Hazrat bazaar opens. This prayer hall also has an entrance to the minaret.

The brick minaret is a tapering cylindrical shaft that is 28.5 metres (94 ft) high (Note: One source reports the minaret as 31.2 metres (102 ft) high.) and sits on a tall cylindrical base. It was renovated in the Safavid era, when a ma'azanah resting on a muqarnas cornice was built. Like other minarets of the Seljuk era, it was originally detached from the mosque. As the minaret tapers near the top with a diameter of 5.5 metres (18 ft), there is an octagonal balcony and a Safavid-style handrail. The minaret is further decorated with brick geometric designs and rough Kufic scripts.

The mosque is constructed of brick. Within the prayer halls, the columns are also brick, and the vaults are stuccoed. The great iwan is ornamented with elaborate brickwork, two polychrome inscriptions, and a tile band. Tilework is also found in the east entrance.

== See also ==
- Islam in Iran
- List of mosques in Iran
