= Clouds Forest =

Forest in the Alborz mountains of Iran

Coordinates: 36°44′N 54°23′E

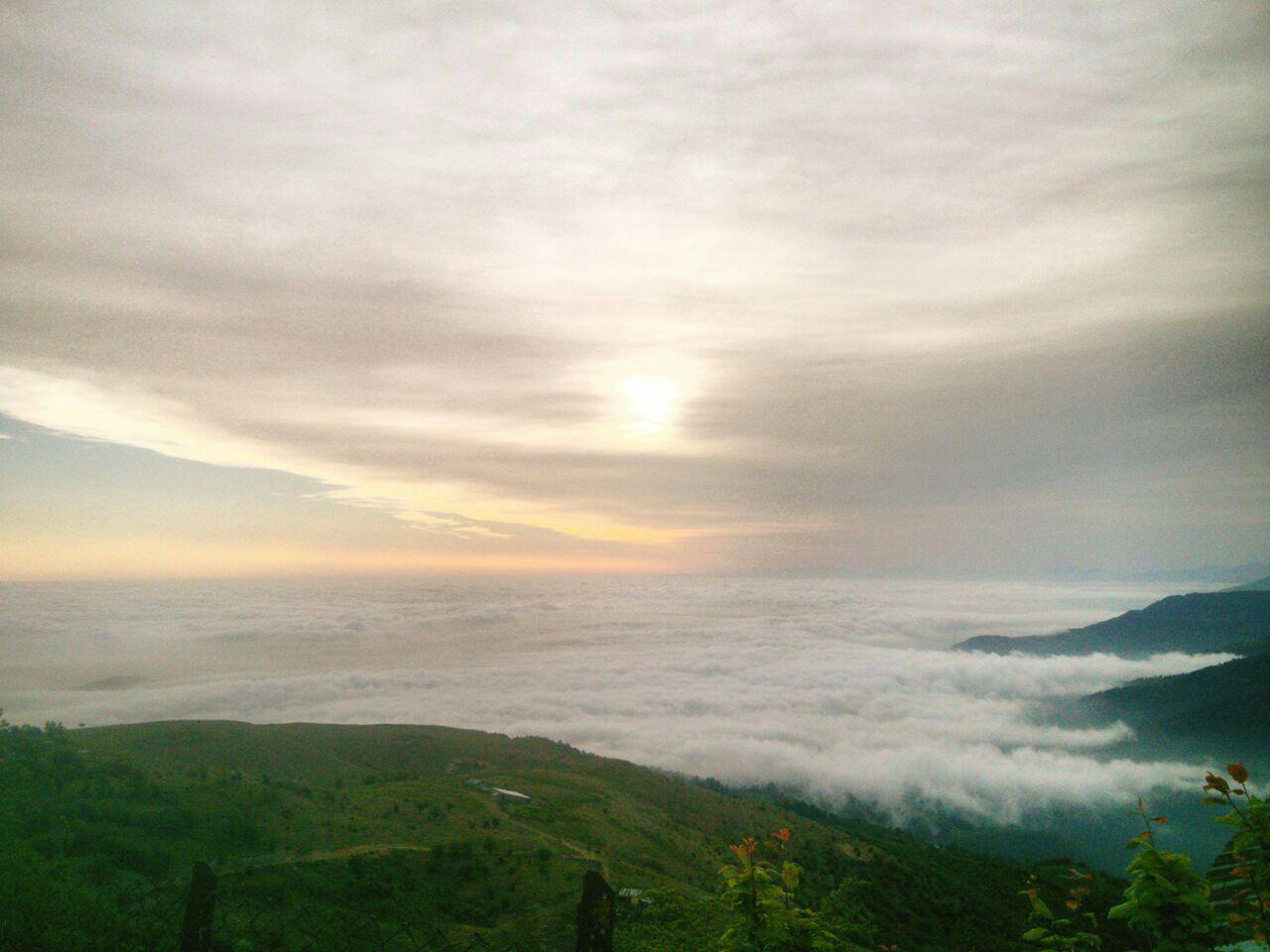
The Clouds Forest in the Republic of Iran

The Clouds Forest is located on the slopes of the Alborz Mountains in Iran. It includes a sea of clouds that pass through it throughout the year. The forest encompasses an area of 530,000 hectares, extending from Semnan Province to Golestan Province in the north. It constitutes one of the most impressive areas of Shahroud city in Semnan Province, situated east of Tehran's capital. This forest represents a significant remnant of the ancient Hyrcanian forests during the Tertiary period. It extends along the southern shores of the Caspian Sea in the form of a verdant band across Semnan Province.

== Location ==
The Clouds Forest is situated 45 kilometers northeast of Shahroud City in Semnan Province, along the Azadshahr road in the vicinity of a village designated "Abr," which translates to "Cloud." This location is situated on the route from Semnan to Golestan Province in northern Iran.

== Geography ==
The Clouds Forest is situated at the northern base of the imposing Alborz Mountains. In this region, a high elevation is situated near a lower one, resulting in a distinctive phenomenon where clouds become trapped between the precipitous peaks of the mountains. As they attempt to break free, the clouds descend near the trees, eventually, these clouds transform into raindrops.

== Ecological Features ==
This forest is distinguished by its elevated position above sea level, its relatively cool summer temperatures, and the presence of natural springs within its boundaries. It also exhibits a diverse woodland cover and is home to several medicinal plants.

In the highlands of this region, forest pastures and meadows are found, while at lower altitudes, forests with various species of trees can be seen. Within the forests, many springs with diverse vegetation are prominent features of this natural region. Among its fruit-bearing plants are wild pears or Pyrus pyraster, plums and raspberries.The forest also contains rare plants and trees such as elm, beech, oak, alder, sorbus, Taxus baccata — especially the juniper tree, which is unique to this region and grows close to the ground.

== Wildlife in the forest ==
The Clouds Forest is home to a wide variety of wildlife, including animals such as bears, leopards, ibexes, and other wild creatures. The forest also contains rare plants and trees, such as elm, beech, oak, alder, Sorbus, Taxus, and notably the Juniper tree, which is unique to this region and grows close to the ground. Additionally, it serves as a source of rare medicinal herbs, which influences the area's biodiversity. This forest lies between two distinct climatic zones: one with a dry and semi-arid climate, and the other with a humid and semi-humid climate, contributing to its rich animal and plant diversity. In autumn, the weather is cold and rainfall makes it difficult to access. The Cloud Forest is also cold in winter, just like in autumn.

== See also ==
- Forests of Iran
- Rainforest
- Tropical forest
- Amazon rainforest
- Ancient woodland
- Białowieża Forest
- Conifer
- Secondary forest
- Wildlife of Iran
