= Nosratollah Noohian =

Iranian journalist and poet (1931–2020)

Nosratollah Noohian (pen name Nooh, Persian: نصرت الله نوح; 1931– 10 August 2020) was an Iranian poet, journalist, lecturer and left-leaning political activist.

== Life ==
Nosratollah Noohian was born in 1931 in Semnan province in Iran and moved to Tehran in 1950, where his literary and political career began.

With increasing political unrest following the 1953 Iranian coup d'état, he was briefly arrested and, after gaining his freedom, continued to publish under the pseudonyms "Sepand" and "Mikh".

From 1960 he worked as a reporter for Kayhan newspaper (until 1979) and collaborated with many other Tehran publications.

Noohian emigrated to the United States in 1987 and continued his literary work.

Noohian died from kidney failure in California, on 10 August 2020, at the age of 89.

== Poetry ==
His first published poem was in 1951 for the satirical paper Chalangar (under the editorship of Mohammad Ali Afrashte. Thereafter his poems were published under the pen name Nooh.

Soon after publishing his first book of poetry, The Wounded Wolf, in 1954, he was arrested, and the book was banned.

The poetry collection "Wilted Flowers" was published in 1957, followed by "World of Colors" in 1963. Following the 1979 Iranian Revolution his political poetry was published in the book "Child of Suffering". In the US his book of poetry "Extinguished Fire Temple" was published in 1998, followed by "Naneh's Sayings - Poems in Semnani Dialect" in 2001.

== Literary work ==
His literary compilations include Biographies of Poets of Semnan (1958), which was republished in the US in 2001, "Shining Stars" (1959), a collection of published articles relating to Persian poetry, and "Works of Raf'at Semnani" (1960) (رفعت سمنانی) with an introduction by Zabihollah Safa.

The 3 volume collection on the life and works of Mohammad Ali Afrashte was published in the years following the 1979 revolution. These were: "Poetical Works of Mohammad Ali Afrashte", "Forty Stories", "Plays, Passion Plays, and Travelogues".

Noohian edited and published Forsat Shirazi's "Monuments of Persians" along with the author's critical introduction and biography in 1983.

While in the U.S., he re-published as one volume the politico-satirical journal Ahangar published in Iran following the 1979 Revolution. In the introduction of the volume, Noohian delved into the history of the journal, including its founding, publication, censorship and eventual banning of the journal.

The seminal book Analysis of Satire in Persian Literature and Media was published in San Jose, California in 1994 with an introduction by Mohammad Jafar Mahjoub.

Noohian collected unpublished works of Yaghma Jandaghi and with a critical introduction published them in the U.S. in 2006.

== Hafez class ==
Nooh taught weekly classes on the great Persian poet Hafez in the Bay Area from 1991. The class has been the venue of many luminaries in Persian poetry, including Houshang Ebtehaj, Esmail Khoi, and Simin Behbahani, among others.

== Memoirs and lectures ==
In the years living in the U.S., Noohian continued his love for Persian poetry by giving lectures throughout the U.S. and Canada on topics around satire and Persian poetry, including in North Carolina, Maryland and Virginia, Orlando, Toronto and Vancouver.

Noohian's memoirs, titled "Yadmandeha" (Memoirs), covering fifty years of literary and political upheavals during Iran's constructive years was published in five volumes in San Jose.

== Works ==
=== Poetry ===
- گرگ مجروح (Wounded Wolf), 1954
- گلهایی که پژمرد (Wilted Flowers), 1957
- دنیای رنگها (World of Colors), 1963
- فرزند رنج (Child of Suffering), 1979
- آتشکده سرد (Extinguished Fire Temple), 1998
- ننین حکاتی (Naneh's Sayings), 2001

=== Author ===
- بررسی طنز در ادبیات و مطبوعات فارسی (Analysis of Satire in Persian Literature and Media), 1994
- یادمانده ها : از بزرگ علوی تا رحمان هاتفی (Memoirs: Literary, Professional & Political), in 5 volumes, 2002–2014

=== Editor ===
- تذکره شعرای سمنان (Biographies of Poets of Semnan), 1958 (reprinted 2001 in U.S.)
- ستارگان تابان (Shining Stars), 1959
- دیوان رفعت سمنانی (Works of Raf'at Semnani), 1960
- Works of Mohammad Ali Afrashte
  - مجموعه آثارمحمد علي افراشته (Poetical Works)
  - چهل داستان (Forty Stories)
  - نمایشنامه ها،تعزیه ها،سفرنامه (Plays, Passion Plays, and Travelogues)
- آثار عجم (Monuments of Persians), by Forsat Shirazi, 1983
- آهنگر (Ahangar), 1993 (republished in the U.S.)
- یغمای جندقی: عبیدی دیگر در دوره قاجار (Yaghma Jandaghi, Another Obeid during the Qajar Era), 2006
