= Eberhard Werner =

Eberhard Werner may refer to:

- Eberhard Werner (artist)
- Eberhard Werner (theologian)
