= Mehner Bach =

River in Germany

Location
- Country: Germany
- State: North Rhine-Westphalia
- Reference no.: DE: 47612

Physical characteristics
- Source
  - location: Wiehen Hills south of Obermehnen
  - coordinates: 52°16′17″N 8°35′30″E
  - elevation: ca. 210 m above sea level (NN)
- Mouth
  - location: South of Hedem into the Große Aue
  - coordinates: 52°20′03″N 8°32′34″E
  - elevation: 51 m above sea level (NN)
- Length: 9.0 km (5.6 mi)
- Basin size: 8.4 km^{2} (3.2 sq mi)

Basin features
- Progression: Große Aue→ Weser→ North Sea
- Landmarks: Villages: Lübbecke, Preußisch Oldendorf

The Mehner Bach, also called the Obermehner Mühlenbach or just the Mühlenbach, is a 9.0 kilometre long stream, that mainly flows through the East Westphalian borough of Lübbecke but also through Preußisch Oldendorf. It forms the longitudinal axis of the former parish of Blasheim, on which the farms and mills of the Mehner Dorf are situated.

== Course ==
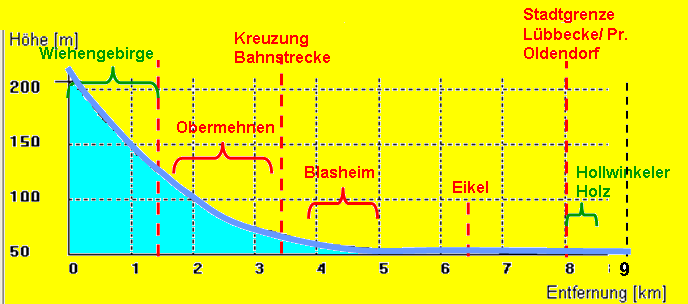
Gradient and course of the Mehner Bach

The source region of the Mehner Bach consists of two stream runs and lies in the Wiehen Hills. The eastern headstream rises not far from the summit of the Kahle Wart near the boundary with the parish of Hüllhorst, the western one in an area that is known as Gerliethe. Both headstreams merge 300 metres south of the village of Obermehnen. The Mehner Bach then flows generally north-northwest through the Lübbecke Loessland, through the two villages of Obermehnen and Untermehnen, then through Blasheim and Eikel and finally through the Hollwinkel Wood. As it enters the aforementioned wooded area the stream leaves the territory of Lübbecke and flows for around 700 metres on the land of the borough of Preußisch Oldendorf, before emptying into the Große Aue not far from the village of Hedem.

Just southwest of the Hollwinkel Wood the stream forms the boundary between the boroughs ofLübbecke and Preußisch Oldendorf for around 50 metres. Its catchment area also includes a small part of the parish Hüllhorst because, in the source region, the boundary between the commune of Hüllhorst and the territory of Lübbecke lies somewhat north of the watershed.

The source of the Mehner Bach is located only around 300 metres from the source of the Rehmerloh-Mennighüffer Mühlenbach on the opposite side of the hill crest.
