= Zaza nationalism =

Nationalist ideology of the Zaza people

Zaza nationalism is an ideology that supports the preservation of Zaza people between Turks and Kurds in Turkey. The movement also supports the idea that Zaza people are a different ethnic group from Kurds.

== History ==
Western, Ottoman, Persian, and Arab sources from the 18th to early 20th century routinely described Zazas as Kurds, typically without qualification. Vladimir Minorsky, writing on the ethnographic composition of Iranian and Ottoman borderlands, included that “The Kurds of Dersim speak a peculiar dialect, Dimili, which appears to be distinct from Kurmanji, but they are not considered a separate people.” Similarly, Mark Sykes, who traveled through eastern Anatolia in the early 1900s, observed that “the Zaza-speaking Kurds of Dersim and Palu are of Iranian race and take part in the political and tribal life of Kurdish confederations.” Amir Hassanpour noted that “Zaza speakers traditionally saw themselves as part of the Kurdish nation or 'millet', even if they spoke a distinct language.” Before the 20th century, the Zazas did not identify as Zaza but as Dimilî, Kirmanckî, and Kirdkî. While the term Zaza did have older roots, it was regarded as a foreign term and often pejorative. After 1923, usage of the term Zaza increased with encouragement of the Turkish government.

Zazas played a major role in Kurdish nationalist uprisings after 1923. Sheikh Said, the leader of the Sheikh Said revolt in 1925, was a Zaza who identified as a Kurd and united both Kurmanji and Zazaki speakers under a common Kurdish Islamic cause. Seyid Riza, the leader of the Dersim rebellion in 1937, was also a Zaza who led a Kurdish nationalist revolt partially motivated by religion. Robert Olson stated that “In the Koçgiri revolt, the leaders and participants were Dimili speakers, yet their declared objective was Kurdish autonomy. There was no distinction made between Kurds and Zazas by the insurgents themselves.” Many scholars noted that the role of Zazas in the pioneering of Kurdish nationalism in the 20th century was even more intense than that of Kurmanji-speaking Kurds.

According to Martin van Bruinessen, Turkish authorities began encouraging the idea that Zazas were not Kurds but an entirely different ethnic group, often labeling them as the “third nation”. Robert Olson noted that this distinction was not official or academic but nevertheless accepted by Turkish administrative divisions and governance structures. While Zazaki and Kurmanji were both banned from public use under the 1924 Constitution, the Turkish government made attempts to emphasize differences between them. Schoolbooks and internal military reports explicitly listed Zazas separate from Kurds. The 1930s official reports on Eastern Anatolia presented the Zazas as ethnically and historically distinct from Kurds, portraying them as more likely to assimilate into the Turkish national identity.

In the 1980s and 1990s, Zaza nationalist publications were tolerated by the Turkish government, while Kurdish nationalist publications were banned. Some Zaza intellectuals, encouraged by state support, began advocating for a distinct Zaza identity. Klein noted that the Turkish government had sponsored Zaza cultural institutions and intellectuals who rejected Kurdish identity as a way to counter the rapidly increasing amount of Zazas joining Kurdish parties, especially the PKK, in the 1980s and 1990s. Veli Yadirgi noted that “Zaza nationalism emerged in part through state-sponsored programs that encouraged the portrayal of Zazas as a distinct ethnic group, separate from Kurds.”

In 1992, Martin van Bruinessen wrote that "until recently, the distinction between Zaza and Kurd was not considered of ethnic significance. Most Zazas referred to themselves as Kurds, and were seen as such by others” Abbas Vali also added that "The ethnic distinction between Zazas and Kurds was not recognized as significant until after the foundation of the Turkish Republic. Previously, the cultural and linguistic diversity of the Kurds included Zaza-speakers without contest.”

Zaza nationalism was very small. Nicole Watts added that while a small number of Zaza intellectuals and some of their followers adopted the nationalist idea that Zazas are a distinct people, the vast majority of Zazas continued to identify as Kurds, participate in Kurdish political movements, and dismissed Zaza nationalism as a Turkish state narrative of ethnic division. Martin van Bruinessen similarly added that “Efforts to develop a distinct Zaza nationalism, often with encouragement from the Turkish state, have met with little success. Most Zaza-speaking Kurds continue to see themselves as part of the wider Kurdish nation."

After the Dersim rebellion, the Turkish government launched a campaign to ethnically reconstruct the region. Survivors were resettled, the area was renamed "Tunceli", local identities were targeted for transformation into loyal Turkish citizens, and references to “Kurd” were replaced with “Zaza” in state documentation, although the use of Zazaki was equally repressed alongside Kurmanji.

Turkish nationalist Hasan Reşit Tankut proposed in 1961 to create a corridor between Zaza-speakers and Kurmanji-speakers to hasten Turkification. In some cases in the diaspora, Zazas turned to this ideology because of the more visible differences between them and Kurmanji-speakers.

A significant amount of Zaza nationalists were staunchly pro-Turkish. Martin van Bruinessen stated that Turkish state ideology "encouraged the idea that the Zazas are not Kurds, and this idea found a receptive audience especially among some Sunni religious notables and urbanized elites." Abbas Vali added that Zaza nationalists often mentioned leftist Kurdish politics to "portray Kurds as irreligious or heretical, particularly in opposition to the Sunni Islamic character they assign to Turkish identity." Zazas were generally more religious than Kurmanji Kurds, as the Turkish suppression of the Kurmanji Kurds used heavy Islamic rhetoric, whereas the suppression of Zazas was less associated with Islam. Many pro-state Zazas saw Turkish identity as more civilized than Kurdish identity.

Especially in recent years, the establishment of the Federation of Zaza Associations and the establishment of the Democracy Time Party have started to adopt Zaza identity more.

In the magazines and books she published, Ebubekir Pamukçu said that Zazas was spent for ideologies such as Kurdish and Turkic. Ebubekir Pamukchu said that if there is no national consciousness, Zaza would be assimilated. He suggested that the term Geographical Zazaistan be used for the region where the zazas live. German Linguist Prof. Dr. Ernst Kausen: "He says that zaza people have a population of 3 million. Zaza people were largely assimilated by the Turks and Kurds." Zaza nationalists accuse the PKK of being against Zazas. According to this section, Zaza settlements in the East were evacuated due to both the state and the PKK. Supporters of Zaza nationalism are afraid of being assimilated by Turkish and Kurdish influence. They indicate of protecting Zaza culture, language and heritage rather than seeking any kind of autonomy within Turkey.

Many Zazas who consider themselves ethnic Kurdish oppose Zaza nationalism.

In general, contrary to the scientific research on Zazas in Turkey, Zaza language and Zazas are shown as Kurds. In 2012, RTÜK decided to define Zazaki as a dialect by asking the Kurdish institute. TRT does not have a separate channel for Zazaki broadcasts, they are included in TRT Kurdi. In 2015, members of the Diyarbakir Zaza Association requested TRT to establish a television channel broadcasting only in Zazaki. The Ministry of National Education also offers Zazaki teachers as a Kurdish dialect. On the contrary, there are 'Zaza Language and Literature' departments in Bingöl and Munzur Universities within the body of YÖK.

Rasim Bozbuğa, who has a doctoral thesis on the Zazas, stated that "the millet system applied in the Ottoman period continued in Turkey. Different ethnic groups were evaluated under one roof in the Ottoman Empire. The Ottomans, for example, rejected the Macedonian identity. They included the Macedonians under the Bulgarian umbrella. "In the same way, the effects of this millet system habit on Zazas and their languages are also seen.”

Academic and writer Ali Tayyar Önder also expresses the policy of the state as follows: "Unfortunately, the ignorance of those who represent the state causes the policies to make the Zazas Kurd. Throughout the history of the Republic, as in the Ottoman period, previously district governors, collectors and security forces treated the Zazas as Kurds. "Because of their ignorance. They did not know the difference between the Zaza and the Kurds, so they identified the Zazas as Kurds, like the Kurmancs. Even today, Zazaki is classified as a dialect of Kurdish on state television, contrary to scientific data. This is a big mistake." In the Ottoman period, there were documents, newspaper articles, poets and writers' opinions that evaluated the Zazas separately from the Kurds.

In an interview with Kurdmedia, Kurdish-Zaza linguist Mehemed Malmîsanij said the name of this "Zazaistan" publisher was the "Zaza Culture and Publication House" and was part of the Turkish intelligence services with the task of attacking the Kurdish nationalist movement. "The conclusion that I draw ... is that these [Zaza nationalist groups] were groups based in the state, or with a more favorable expression, groups that thought in parallel with the state".

PKK leader Abdullah Ocalan criticized Zaza movements as "a tool to weaken Kurdish consciousness" and alleged that Turkey's National Intelligence Organization (MİT) was behind the movement.

Dilaver Eren, leader of the Democracy Time Party founded by Zazas, said:

In the past he would describe as the Republic of Turkey are mountainous Kurdish Turks. Now Kurdish friends see Zaza as a dialect of Kurdish. They did not care about the existence of the Zaza people. If they were important, there would be no need for such a political movement.
