= Ebubekir Pamukçu =

Zaza author

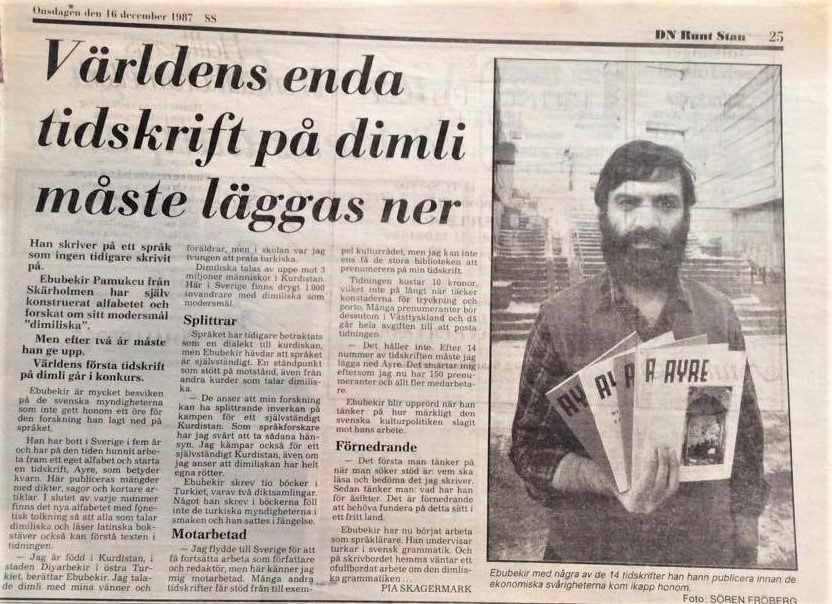
- Pamukçu appeared in Swedish newspapers and promoted Zazaki magazines, 1987
- Born: 2 April 1946; Budaran, Diyarbakır, Turkey
- Died: 1 August 1991 (aged 45); Stockholm, Sweden
- Occupations: Author; teacher; publisher

Ebubekir Pamukçu (2 April 1946 – 18 July 1991) was a Zaza author, teacher, and publisher. He is known for his work on Zazas and Zaza.

== Life ==
Ebubekir Pamukçu was born on 2 April 1946 in Budaran (present-day Pamuklu), the son of Havva and Kemal. His family was a Zaza family with ten children.
