= Obermehnen =

- Ortsteil of Lübbecke
- Location of Obermehnen within Lübbecke
- Interactive map of Obermehnen
- Location within Germany Location within North Rhine-Westphalia
- Coordinates: 52°17′08″N 8°34′40″E
- Country: Germany
- State: North Rhine-Westphalia
- District: Minden-Lübbecke
- Town: Lübbecke

Area
  - Total: 9.58 km^{2} (3.70 sq mi)
- Elevation: 54 m (177 ft)

Population (2020)
  - Total: 1,221
  - Density: 127/km^{2} (330/sq mi)
- Time zone: UTC+01:00 (CET)
  - Summer (DST): UTC+02:00 (CEST)
- Postal codes: 32312
- Dialling codes: 05741

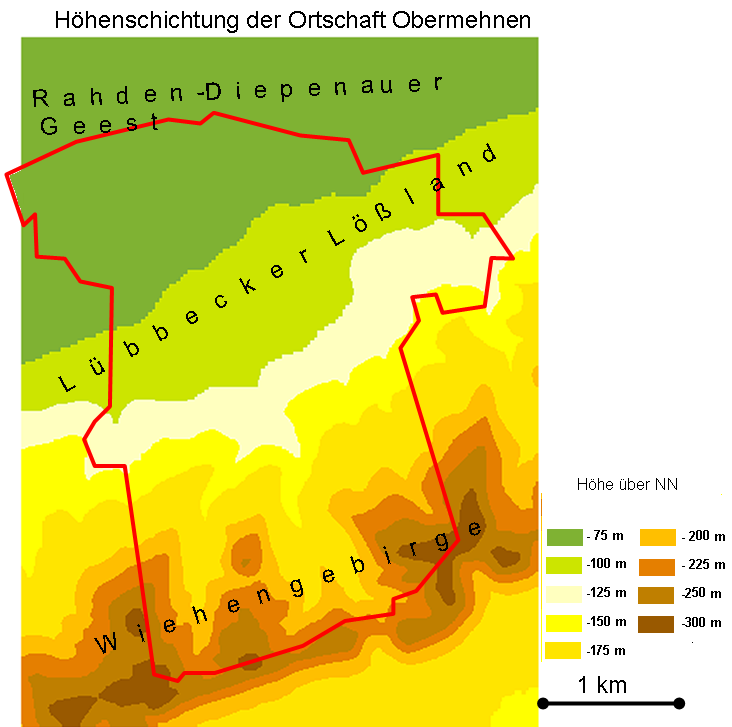
The topography of Obermehnen

Obermehnen is a village in the German state of North Rhine-Westphalia in the county of Minden-Lübbecke. The village belongs administratively to the town of Lübbecke. Obermehnen has 1,360 inhabitants and an area of 9.6 km². At around 137 people per km² Obermehnen has the lowest density of all of Lübbeck's districts, not least because 4.3 km², i.e. 45%, of the parish area consists of uninhabited hill forest on the Wiehen Hills. Obermehnen is thus the most wooded part of the borough of Lübbecke.

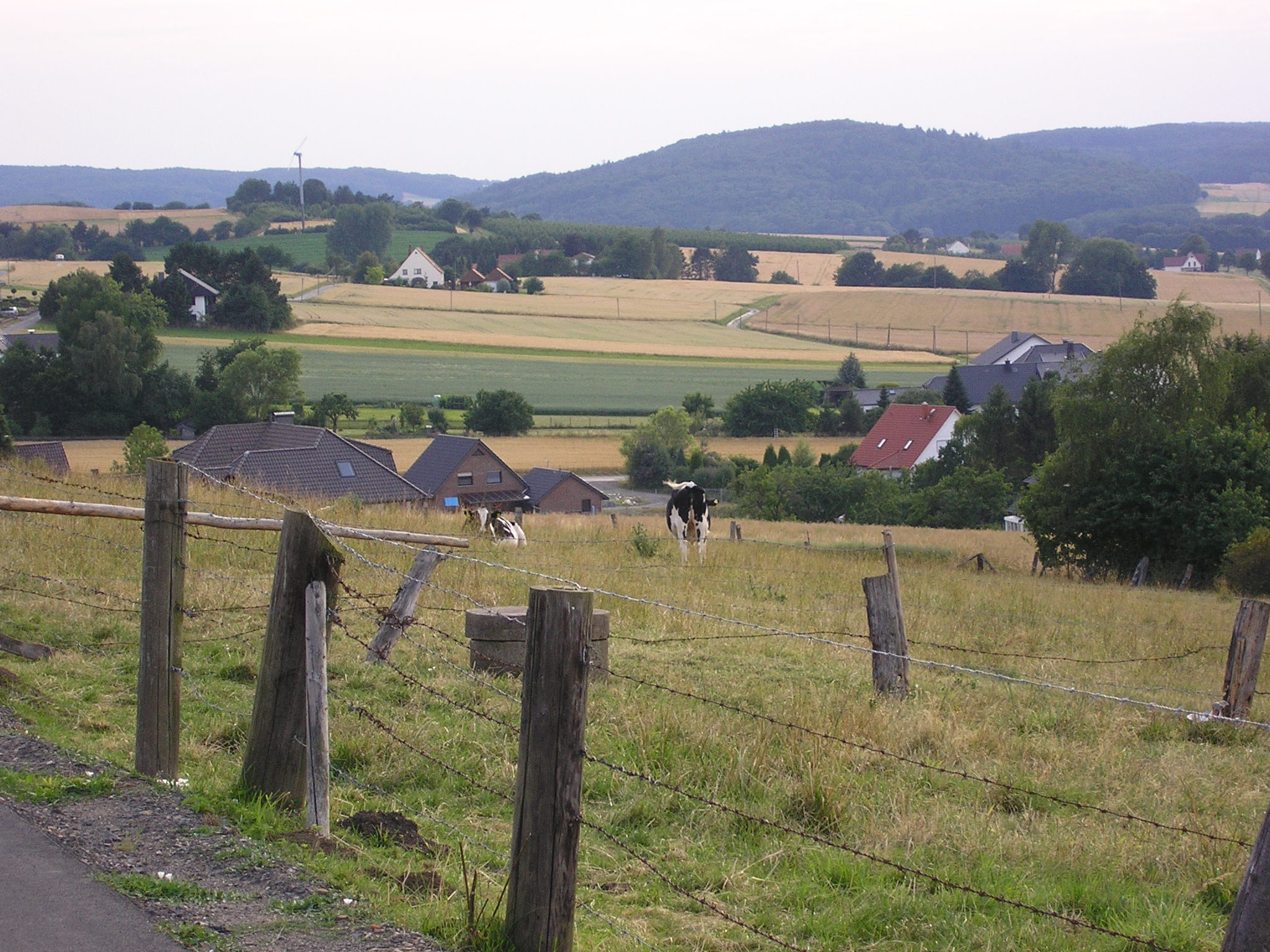
View of parts of the village. Background: the village of Limberg that belongs to Preußisch Oldendorf

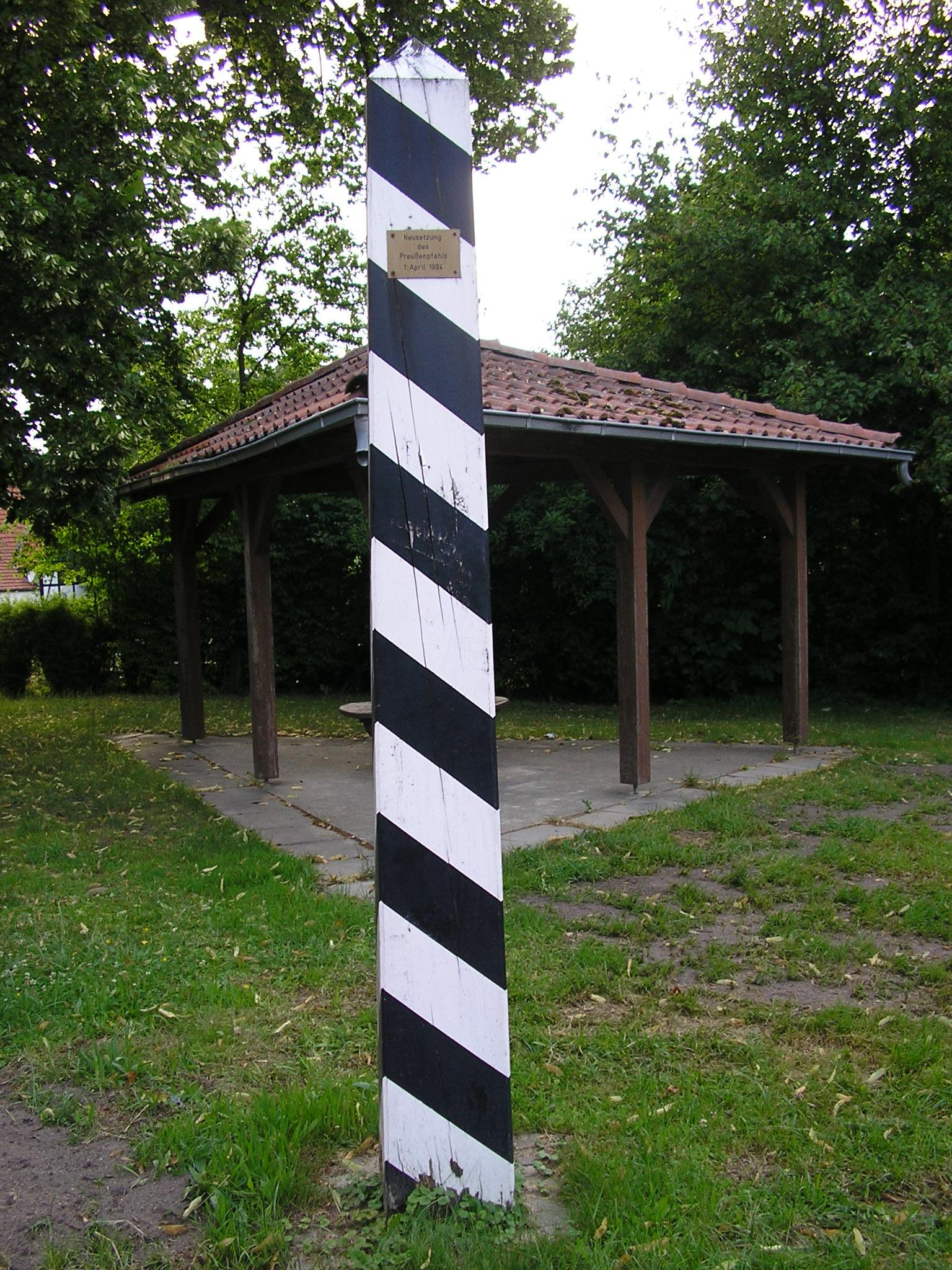
The Preußenpfahl ("Prussian Post") in Obermehnen

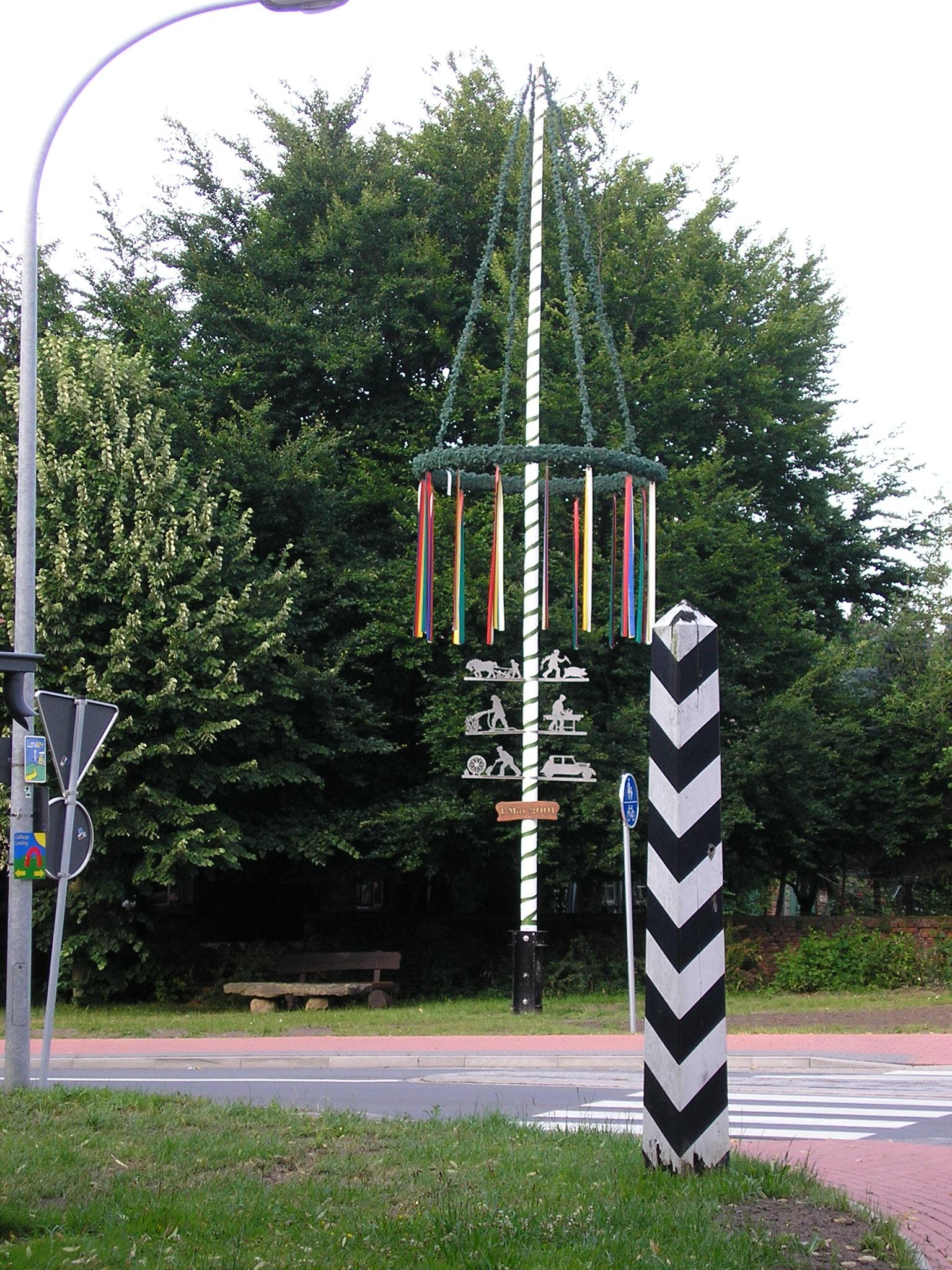
Not far from the Preußenpfahl stands Obermehnen's maypole

== Personalities ==
- Eberhard Werner, artist (landscape painter) lived and died in Obermehnen near Lübbecke
