= Democracy Time Party =

Turkish political party

Demokrasi Zamanı Partisi Democracy Time Party
- Abbreviation: DEZA-PAR
- Leader: Ali Demirel and Hüseyin Özdağ
- Founded: 9 May 2016
- Membership (2026): ▲188
- Ideology: Zaza nationalism Zaza Interests

Website
- https://dezapar.org.tr/

The Democracy Time Party is a political party founded by Mehmet Ali Şenel on 9 May 2016. The short name of the party is DEZA-PAR

== History ==
The party was first established under the name 'Zaza People's Party'. Later, after receiving the warning that “Region cannot be established on the basis of race,” the Supreme Court of Appeals Prosecutor's Office changed its party name as 'Innovative and Change Party'. In the "Innovative and Change Party" congress held in Ankara on September 1, it was renamed "Time of Democracy Party" according to the change of name. 'DEZA' in the short name of the party means 'uncle son' (cousin) in Zaza language. Party leader Dilaver Eren stated that 'DEZA' means 'Cousin' in Zaza language and said that they consciously preferred this as a subliminal message.
