= Zazas =

Iranic people in eastern Turkey

Şarê ma
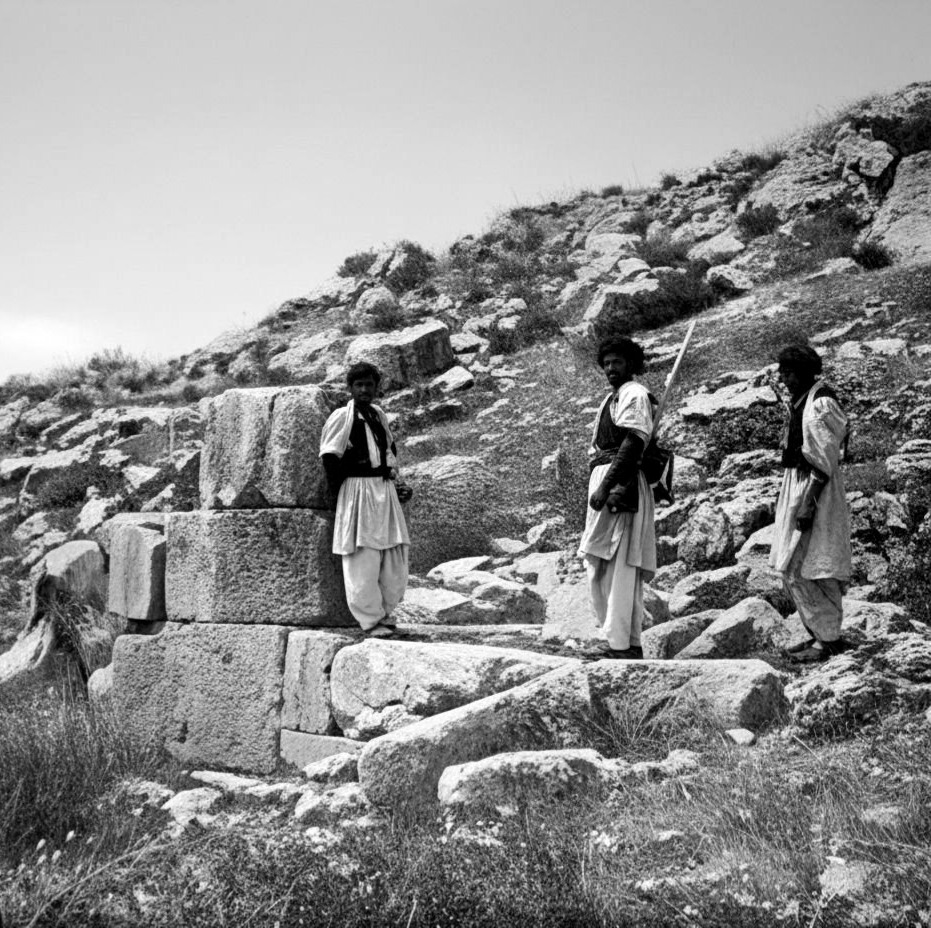
- Zaza men, clad in traditional white garments, stand near the ruins of an old church in Gerger, Ottoman Empire, 1901

Total population
- 2 to 3 million

Regions with significant populations
- Turkey; Diaspora: approx. 300,000; Australia, Austria, Belgium, France, Germany, Netherlands, Sweden, Switzerland, United Kingdom, United States

Languages
- Zaza, Kurdish, and Turkish

Religion
- Majority: Sunni Islam (Shafi'i majority, large Hanafi minority); Significant minority: Alevism

The Zazas (Zaza: Şarê ma, lit. 'Our people') are an Iranian people who speak Zaza, an Iranian language belonging to the Indo-European language family. Zazas live primarily in the Eastern Anatolia and Southeastern Anatolia regions of Turkey. They live in parts of Bingöl, Elazığ, Erzincan, Erzurum, Malatya, Muş, Bitlis and Tunceli provinces in Eastern Anatolia and Adıyaman, Diyarbakır and Şanlıurfa provinces in Southeastern Anatolia. There are also found Zaza communities in provinces such as Kars and Ardahan in Northeastern Anatolia, Kayseri, Sivas and Aksaray in Central Anatolia and Tokat and Gümüşhane in Black Sea regions of Turkey. Outside Turkey, there exists a Zaza diaspora in Western Europe, particularly in Germany.

Zazas are predominantly adherent to Islam, divided internally between the Sunni school and Alevism. This sectarian division is manifested in the dialectal variations of the Zaza language; the northern dialect of the language is spoken by Alevi Zazas, the southern dialect by Hanafi Zazas, and the central dialect by Shafi Zazas. The Zaza population is estimated to be approximately 2 to 3 million. The language of the Zazas, the Zaza language belongs to the Northwestern Iranian branch of the Iranian languages and is closely related to Tati, Talysh, Sangsari, Semnani, Mazandarani and Gilaki.

== Etymology and naming ==
The terms Dımli or Dımıli are often used for the Zaza people and their language. According to the long-proposed theory these terms evolved from the term Dailam or Daila. Alternatively this region is termed as Dailäm, Daylâm or Dailâm. Thus it is proposed that the origin of the Zaza people lies in the province of Dailam or Daylam in ancient Persia and modern northern Iran, close to the southern Caspian Sea. According to Encyclopædia Iranica, the endonym Dimlī or Dīmla was derived from Daylam region in Northern Iran and appears in Armenian historical records as delmik, dlmik, which was proposed to be derived from Middle Iranian *dēlmīk meaning Daylamite. The theory that Dimlī or Dīmla is derived from Daylam and that Zazas are descendants of Daylamites has been supported by scholars such as Friedrich Carl Andreas, Oskar Mann, Karl Hadank, Ely Bannister Soane, Arthur Christensen, Richard N. Frye, Vladimir Minorsky, Ehsan Yarshater, Gernot Ludwig Windfuhr, Ferdinand Hennerbichler, Walter Bruno Henning,William Burley Lockwood, Ludwig Paul, Clifford Edmund Bosworth, Jos. Schrijnen, David Neil MacKenzie, Garnik Asatrian and Victoria Arakelova and the Daylam thesis has been the most popular thesis regarding the origins of the Zaza people and the Zaza language since the first researchers of the Zaza language. Among their neighbors, the people are known mainly as Zāzā, which meant “stutterer” and was used as a pejorative. Hadank and Mckenzie attribute relative abundance of sibilants and affricates in the Zaza language to explain the semantic etymology of the name. Some have pointed out the phonetic similarity between the terms Dimili and Dunbuli. This connection is supported by several evidences, including the use of the terms Dummel or Zaza in Kurdistan to refer to the Azerbaijani Dunbuli tribe, historical records of the Dunbuli tribe migrating to Dersim during the reign of Shah Ismail, and documented evidence that the Dunbuli tribe in Palu spoke Zazaki. In some regions, the term Dunbuli is still used to refer to the Zazas. According to this view, the term Dimilî may derive from the name of the Dunbulî (also spelled Dumbulî), a Kurdish tribe documented since the 12th century. Karl Hadank, on the other hand, in his prominent work on Zaza, "Mundarten der Zâzâ" (1932), discusses the claimed relationship between Dimli and Dunbuli in detail over several pages, presents evidence from various historical sources and concludes that equating the Dunbuli with the Zaza is impossible, the term Dimli cannot be derived from the term Dunbuli and the Dimli people and the Dunbuli tribe are different. Eberhard Werner, in his anthropological work on Zazas also discusses the Dunbuli topic and concludes that there is little information as to whether the Dunbuli and the Dimili are the same and there is no single reference in Zaza oral traditions about the so-called Dunbuli move. Furthermore the Dunbuli tribe view fails to account for the linguistic affinities of the Zaza language which shares extensive parallels with the Caspian languages as well-documented in Iranian studies, therefore, it is challenged due to an absence of corroborating historical and linguistic data.

The endonym Dımli/Dımıli and its derivations are primarily used for Southern Zaza. Zazas living in places such as Aksaray, Şanlıurfa, Siverek, Diyarbakır, Çüngüş, Adıyaman, Gerger and Mutki refer to themselves as Dımli/Dımıli, and refer to the Zaza language as Dımılki/Dımıli. At the same time, the same endonym Dımıl(ki) is also used in various regions among northern Alevi Zazas for the Zaza language. Zazas living in Elazığ, Palu, Maden, Alacakaya, Arıcak, Çermik, Bingöl, Varto, and Sivas-Koçgiri regions refer to themselves as Zaza and refer to the Zaza language as Zazaki. The endonym Zaza is found in all dialects of the Zaza language. While almost all Zazas who speak the central dialect of Zaza refer to themselves as Zaza and refer to their language as Zazaki, in places such as Palu, Bingöl and Dicle, the endonym of Kırd, along with Zaza, is also found to a limited extent. A part of Alevi Zazas refer to themselves as Kırmanc and refer to their language as Kırmancki, even though the endonym Dımılki is also known among the older generation Alevi Zazas. A second part of Alevi Zazas living in regions such as Bingöl, Erzurum and Varto, instead of a special designation, refer to the Zaza language as "zonê ma" which means "our language" and they refer to themselves as "şarê ma", which means "our people".

== History ==
=== Origins and early history ===
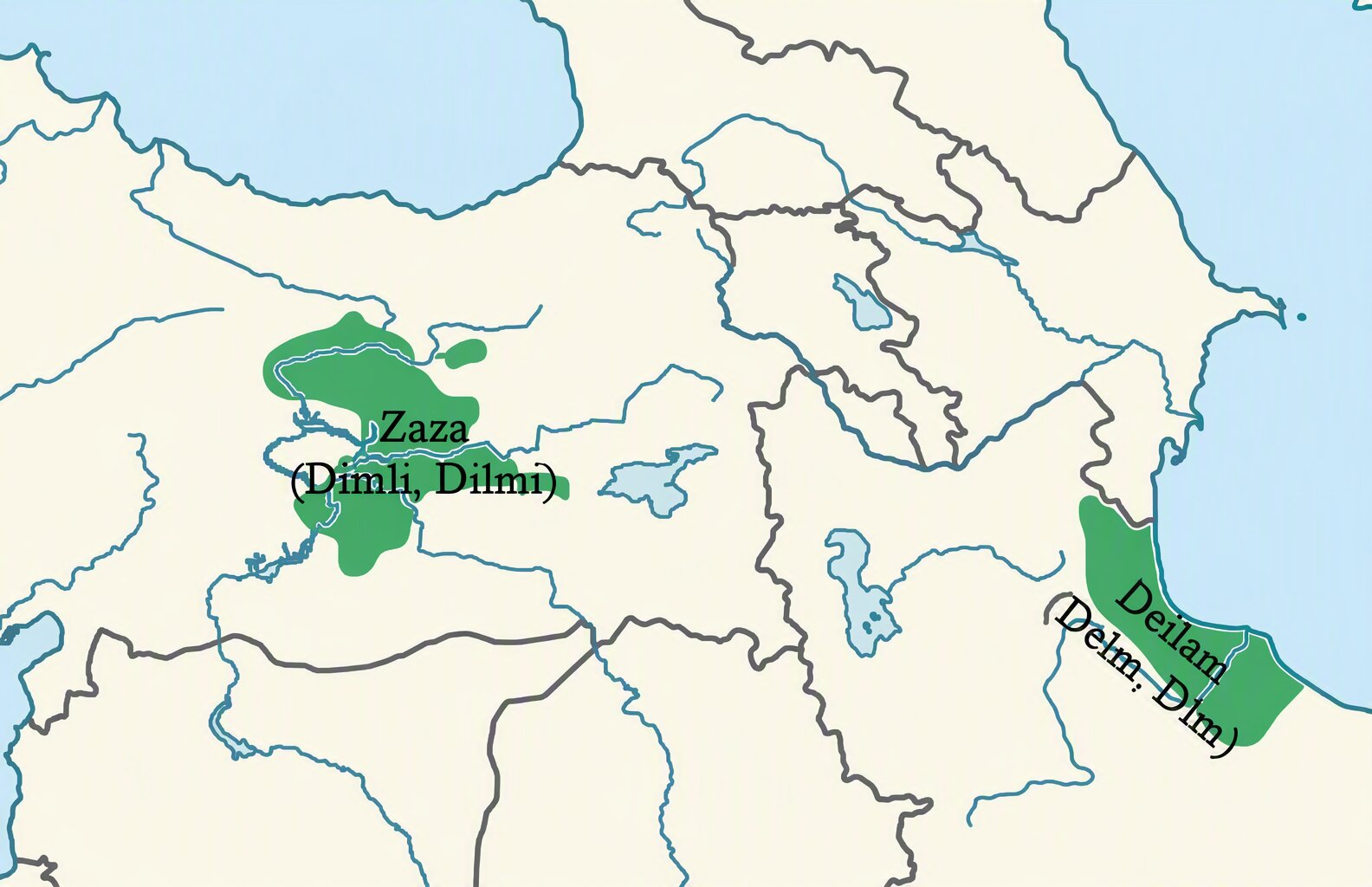
The geographical distribution of Zazas (Dimli, Dilmi) and the historical Deilam (Delm, Dlm) region

The most important theory regarding the origins of the Zazas is that they are originally Daylamites from the Daylam region. Since the first modern studies on the Zaza language and Zazas, this theory has been substantiated by many different scholars. According to this theory, the Zazas migrated from the southern shores of the Caspian Sea to Eastern Anatolia, along with other communities. The etymology of the endonym Dimlī and the historical records of migrations and raids of Daylamites to Anatolia in Armenian sources are also adduced as an evidence of Daylamite origins of the Zaza people. Scholars believe that the Zaza-speaking populations relocated from their Daylamite ancestral homeland in northern Iran to their contemporary Anatolian settlements between the 9th/10th and 12th centuries AD, during the extensive Daylamite expansion. During this era, the Daylamites extended their territorial control by launching raids into adjacent regions and migrating deeper into Western Asia. This expansive movement took Daylamite factions well beyond the Caspian littoral. After traversing the borders of Iran, the Daylamites penetrated Azerbaijan, Armenia, Arran, Bagrevand, Vaspurakan and Anatolia. Their military campaigns and subsequent territorial conquests extended across a broad geographical continuum, spanning the Black Sea littoral of Lazica and Georgia, modern-day Azerbaijan and Armenia, regions of modern-day Iraq and Syria, including Aleppo and several eastern and southeastern Anatolian localities, namely Van, Kars, Ağrı, Kapetron, Erzurum, Manzikert, Diyarbakır, Mayyāfāriqīn (Silvan) and Harpoot. As this process unfolded, numerous Daylamite factions dispersed into neighboring areas. They initially maintained their cultural identity before gradually merging with the indigenous populations. Scholarly discourse posits that as a result of this migratory and expansionary phase, the Daylamite populations, including the ancestors of the modern Zazas as a Daylamite faction, progressed westward into the territories they currently inhabit. As documented in Encyclopædia Iranica, the ethnonym Dimlī/Dīmla traces its origins to the Daylam region. This etymology is supported by medieval Armenian historical records, which feature the variants delmik and dlmik, forms derived from the Middle Iranian lexeme *dēlmīk (Daylamite). Throughout historical records, the Daylam region has been designated by the ethnonymic variants dilmik, dilmuk, delum dilm. Diachronically, these forms are posited to have undergone the phonological metathesis of a nasal-liquid cluster, shifting from \(/lm/\) to \(/ml/\), which ultimately resulted in the derived lexical variants Dilmi and Dimli. Dilm, one of the historical designations of the Daylam region, is retained in its unaltered (unmetathesized) phonological form within the contemporary Zaza endonym "Dilmic". Morphologically, the term is a compound of the base "Dilm" and the suffix -ic, which denotes origin and affiliation in the Zaza language and persists in various Caspian languages of the Daylam region with the same attributive function. Etymologically, therefore, "Dilmic" translates to "from Dilm." The Daylamite origin theory is corroborated by linguistic evidence as well. Within the Northwestern Iranian language branch, the profound phylogenetic affinity shared between the Caspian languages spoken in Daylam and Zaza is extensively documented in comparative Iranian studies. Zaza shares a multiplicity of distinct phonological features, morphosyntactic structures, and lexical isolates with these Caspian languages that are conspicuously absent in other Iranian varieties and linguistic evidence put the linguistic homeland of the Zaza language to Northern Iran, especially around the southern Caspian region due to the strong linguistic affinity between the Zaza, Tati, Talysh, Gilaki and Mazanderani languages. In this context, the fact that the closest linguistic affinities to Zaza are found not in geographically contiguous regions but rather in the southern Caspian region, also corroborates the Daylamite origin of the Zaza people and indicates that they preserved their language in isolation following their migration from the Daylam region. Another significant hypothesis concerning the migration of the Zaza people from Daylam posits that this displacement may have occurred substantially earlier than previously assumed. In this regard, the Byzantine historian Agathias (536–582 CE), writing during the reign of Justinian I (6th century CE), documents the Daylamites (lit. Dilimnites) people in the third book of his historical chronicles. He notes their presence along the Tigris River, a region historically associated with the modern Zaza population, and describes their role as combatants within the Sasanian army fighting against the Byzantine Empire. In the Zoroastrian Pahlavi text Bundahishn, dated to the 8th–9th centuries CE, the ancestral and contemporary geographical habitat of the Zazas, situated at the sources of the Euphrates and Tigris rivers, is designated as Dēlamān/Dēlman, a toponym semantically associated with Daylam. The corroboration across both early medieval documents, which identify contemporary Zaza settlements as Daylam/Daylamite, suggests an earlier migration of the Zazas from the Daylam region than previously hypothesized. A study from 2005, on the other hand, does not support the Northern Iranian theory and rather proposes a closer link between Kurdish and Zaza-speakers compared to Northern Iranian populations. Kurmanji-speaking Kurds and Zazas have for centuries lived in the same areas in Anatolia. The Zaza minstrel tradition goes back to the medieval period, when Zaza-speaking bards composed works both in their mother tongue and in Turkish.

=== Modern period ===
Since Armenians and Zazas have for centuries lived in the same areas, the first comprehensive works about the Zazas were produced by their Armenian neighbors. In Dictionarium Armeno-Latinum, the first printed Armenian dictionary describing neighboring peoples and geographies published in 1621, the Zazas are defined as "a Parthian nation" under Demli, their Armenian exonym. In the late 1800s, the Armenian traveler Adranik visited the Dersim region and published a travelogue containing comprehensive information about the Zaza people, referring to them as dǝmǝli, and about the geography, culture and sociology of the Dersim region. In his work, after discussing the origins of the Zazas, he concludes that the Zazas are descendants of the Daylamites (delmiks) who, as mentioned in Armenian sources of that period, raided Anatolia in the Middle Ages. In the late 1800s, another work about the Zazas, referring to them as dlmikner, was published by an Armenian author named A. Mkrtčʿean. His work contains general information about the Zaza people, their culture, traditions and their attitudes towards Armenians, which, similar to Andranik, was described very hospitable. In the early 20th century, Armenian representatives at the Paris Peace Conference, in the memorandum they submitted to the conference on the Armenian Question, again defined the Zazas as one of the indigenous peoples of Greater Armenia. Similarly, in 1878, following the Russo-Turkish War (1877-1878), regarding the Armenians' situation in the peace treaty process, the Zazas are listed as one of the indigenous peoples of Western Armenia again. The fact that Zazas and Armenians have lived together in the same areas for centuries has led to the Zaza language, especially its northern dialect, being influenced by the Armenian language. German Iranologist Oskar Mann made extensive travels to Qajar Iran and the Ottoman Empire between 1901-1906. He visited the Upper Euphrates region of Eastern Anatolia and recorded the Zazas in Gerger, Bucak, Kor, Çapakçur, Palu, Kiğı and Siverek. He conducted a comprehensive documentation study on the Zaza language in these regions.

About the language, the earliest surviving literary works in the Zaza language are two poems with identical titles, Mawlūd, dating from the late 19th and early 20th centuries. In the 1920s and 1930s, several Zaza rebellions occurred in Eastern and Southeastern Anatolia. In the Koçgiri region, some Alevi Zazas participated in the Koçgiri rebellion in 1920. Later, during the Sheikh Said rebellion in 1925, the Zaza Sheikh Said and his supporters rebelled against the newly established Republic because of its Turkish nationalist and secular ideology. The rebellion was later suppressed. Some Zazas subsequently joined the Kurmanji-speaking Kurdish nationalist Xoybûn, the Society for the Rise of Kurdistan, and other movements, where they often rose to prominence. In 1937, during the Dersim rebellion, Alevi Zazas in the region rebelled against the newly established Republic. The rebellion was led by Seyid Riza and was suppressed by the government of the Republic, ended with a massacre of thousands of Kurmanji-speaking Kurds and Zaza civilians, while many were internally displaced due to the conflict. Sakine Cansız, a Zaza from Tunceli, was a founding member of Kurdistan Workers Party (PKK), and like many Zazas joined the rebels, including the prominent Besê Hozat.

Following the 1980 Turkish coup d'état, many intellectual minorities, including Zazas, emigrated from Turkey towards Europe, Australia and the United States. The migration of Zazas to European countries in the 1980s and the relatively free environment in Europe enabled the revival of Zaza culture in Europe. And in the 1980s and subsequent periods, the Zaza diaspora in Europe published numerous printed works concerning Zaza language, history and culture. In 2004, linguists established the Frankfurt Zaza Language Institute in Germany, followed by the foundation of the Zaza Language and Culture Association in Istanbul in 2011. Along with the 2010s, numerous local Zaza language and culture associations were established and through the merger of these associations, the Federation of Zaza Associations was founded in Ankara in 2018.

== Demographics and geographical distribution ==
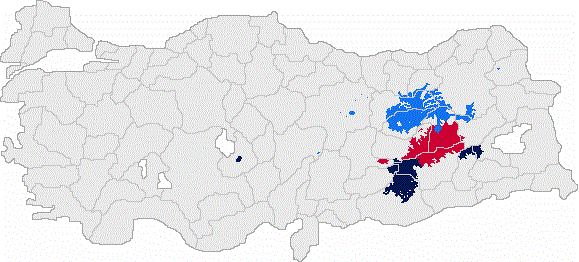
The distribution of the three primary dialects of the Zaza language in Turkey.

The exact number of the Zazas is unknown, due to the absence of recent and extensive census data. The last census on language in Turkey was held in 1965, where 150,644 people ticked Zaza as their first language and 112,701 as their second language. More recent data from 2005 suggests that the Zaza-speaking population varies from approximately 2 to 4 million.

According to a 2015 study that examined the demographics of the voting-age population in the Kurdish inhabited areas in Turkey (Northeast, Central East and Southeast Anatolia statistical regions, n=1918) 12.8% of the people ethnically identified as Zaza, which made Zaza the biggest ethnic identity after Kurdish (73%) in the region. Zaza speakers were more numerous (15%) compared to people who identify with the Zaza ethnic identity, showing that some Zaza speakers identified as other ethnicities, primarily Kurds.

Following the 1980 Turkish coup d'état, many intellectual minorities, including Zazas, emigrated from Turkey towards Europe, Australia and the United States. The largest part of the Zaza diaspora is in Europe, predominantly in Germany.

== Culture ==
=== Language ===
Zaza is the ancestral language of the Zaza people and belongs to the Northwestern Iranian branch of the Iranian languages. The Zaza language is recognized as a macrolanguage by international linguistic authorities. SIL International classifies the Zaza language as a macrolanguage, including the varieties of Southern Zaza (diq) and Northern Zaza (kiu). Other international linguistic authorities, Ethnologue and Glottolog, also categorize the Zaza language as a macrolanguage composed of two distinct individual languages: Southern Zaza and Northern Zaza. In terms of grammar, morphosyntactic structure, core lexicon and diachronic development the Zaza language is closely related to the Tati of Iran, Talysh, Semnani, Sangsari, Gilaki and Mazandarani languages spoken on the shores of the Caspian Sea. It is spoken in the east of modern Turkey, with approximately two to three million speakers. There is a division between Northern and Southern Zaza, most notably in phonological and morphological inventory, however, Zaza as a whole forms a dialect continuum, with no recognized standard.

A study published in 2015 that demographically analysed voting-age adults in the Kurdish inhabited regions of Turkey (excluding diaspora) concluded that 96.2% of people who identified as Zaza, but not Kurdish in the region spoke Zazaki as their mother tongue. On the contrary only 58.4% of the surveyed Zaza people declared that their primary home language was Zazaki, and Turkish was the second most popular home language with 38.3% of Zazas speaking it at their homes. 1.9% of the surveyed people who identified as Zaza expressed that their home language was Kurdish. Around 1.4% people belonging to Kurdish ethnic identity also spoke Zazaki as their mother language. Concerning Alevis, which were separately analysed, c. 70% spoke Zazaki, but Turkish (70%) was the dominant household language. Ziflioğlu states that many Zazas only speak Kurmanji.

The first written statements in the Zaza language were compiled by the linguist Peter Lerch in 1850. Two other important documents are the religious writings of Ehmedê Xasi of 1898, and of Osman Efendîyo Babij; both of these works were written in Arabic script. The state-owned TRT Kurdî airs shows in Zaza. During the 1980s, the Zaza language became popular among the Zaza diaspora, followed by publications in Zaza in Turkey.

=== Religion ===
Zazas are predominantly Muslims and are divided between Sunni Islam and Alevism. Alevi Zazas share a more homogeneous sectarian affiliation, Sunni Zazas, on the other hand, are divided into the Hanafi and Shafi'i schools of thought. The sectarian divisions among the Zaza people are reflected in the three primary dialects of the Zaza language. The geographical distribution of the primary Zaza dialects aligns closely with the Zaza sectarian divisions. The Southern Zaza group who speak the more archaic Southern Zaza are Sunni Muslims following the teaching of the Hanafi school, similar to Turks and Arabs in the region and in contrast to the Kurds who are predominantly Shafi'i. The eastern group who speak the eastern dialect of Zaza is predominantly Shafi'i, similar to Kurds. Sunni Zazas, similar to Sunni Talysh who speak a related language are mostly Naqshbandi. The northern group who speak the northern dialect of Zaza adheres to the Alevi faith.

The exact number of Hanafi, Shafi'i and Alevi Zazas is unknown. Various field studies conducted in Eastern and Southeastern Anatolia estimate the percentage of Shafi'i Zazas to be between 61.72% and 75.4%; the percentage of Hanafi Zazas to be between 9.8% and 21.12% and the percentage of Alevi Zazas to be between 14.8% and 17,14%. Alevism is the second largest Islamic sect among Zazas with 14.8% to 17,14% adhering it and Zazas had the highest Alevi percentage among any group by far, being followed by Turks (5.4%) and Kurds (3.1%). It was also reported that around 70% of the Alevis spoke Zaza as their mother language. Alevi Zazas predominantly live in provinces of Tunceli, Erzincan and Sivas. Zaza Alevism, as has been long documented, is a heterodox and mystical belief system incorporating many local and natural elements. Historically, a small Christian Zaza population existed in Gerger. Once consisting of approximately 150 households, the local Christian population has undergone a marked demographic contraction, with only six households remaining present today.

=== Festivals ===
Although Zazas share some common celebrations and special days with neighboring peoples, such as Eid al-Fitr and Eid al-Adha, they have their own feasts, celebrations and special days that distinguish them from neighboring peoples. Some of these celebrations are as follows: Gağand, Newe Marti, Kormışkan, Hewtemal, Qereçarseme/Karaçarşamba and Serra Newe. Gağand and Serra Newe are the New Year celebrations of the Zazas and Kormışkan and Hewtemal are spring festivals of the Zazas. While some of these feasts are celebrated by all Zazas, some are celebrated by Alevi or Sunni Zazas, depending on sectarian difference.

- Kormışkan and Hewtemal: Both are Zaza spring festivals celebrated in March. Kormışkan is celebrated by the Sunni Zazas and its equivalent, Hewtemal is celebrated by the Alevi Zazas. Hewtemal is divided into three sub-celebrations: the Pil one, the Qıc one, and the Peyen one. During these festivals, the Zaza people celebrate the arrival of spring with various activities, such as going out into nature and having picnics.
- Gağand and Serra Newe: Both are the New Year festivals of the Zazas, celebrated in December/January. Both of the festivals are celebrated throughout all Zaza regions. Serra Newe is celebrated by Sunni Zazas and its equivalent, Gağand is generally celebrated among Alevi Zazas and some Sunni Zazas. During the festival, children, dressed in their finest clothes and accompanied by Khalo Gağan (the Old Man), visit every neighbor's door, greet them and receive gifts.

=== Folklore ===
Throughout their historical trajectory, the Zazas have practiced settled agriculture and animal husbandry within a rural-feudal structure. They constitute an agrarian and pastoral community historically bound to a sedentary existence, devoid of nomadic traditions; furthermore, their collective cultural heritage and customary practices substantiate a sustained lineage of localized agriculturalists. Throughout their history, the Zaza people have sustained a rural livelihood fundamentally rooted in traditional agro-pastoral systems and horticultural practices. Historically a geopolitical crossroads, the native geography of the Zaza people Eastern Anatolia has been marked by the continuous superimposition of successive state formations and diverse populations. Consequently, owing to these circumstances and the sociocultural intersectionality of their indigenous geography, the Zaza people have maintained sustained cultural exchanges with neighboring communities throughout eastern Anatolia. Traditional Zaza dances include wedding dances such as Zaza halay, Karaçor, Devzer, Çepki, Fadiki, Kılaçep, and the Eagle Dance, which is common in Bingöl. The Zaza culinary tradition encompasses a diverse gastronomic repertoire, featuring a wide array of meat and vegetable preparations, traditional pastries, distinct desserts and various soups such as Zaza pastry, tava, kavurma, içli köfte, kalbur basması, karnıyarık, gudu faslun, keldaş, klorik, kiremit güveç, dolma, lopik, sörina pel, zerbet, parpar, sarma; germ, tutmaç, germa keşk, kıcı, yeluk and bişi, patile, kılç, kıymalı börek. Traditional Zaza music revolves around themes of longing, love and the human condition. Zaza music predominantly explores themes of exile and homesickness, love, brotherhood, the duality of poverty and prosperity and existential reflections on death and eternity. Instruments such as drums, lutes, tambourines, and zurnas are used. Despite a patriarchal social structure, monogamy is the predominant marital norm among the Zaza people, with polygamy constituting an infrequent and marginal practice.

=== Identity ===
The identity of the Zaza people is contested by Zaza, Kurdish and Turkish nationalist ideologies. Both Kurdish and Turkish nationalist ideologies assert the Zaza people as an intrinsic part of their nations. Zaza nationalists, on the other hand, emphasize the unique status of the Zaza people, frequently citing historical, linguistic and cultural differences and self-definition of the Zazas as evidence of their distinctiveness and distinct identity, from both Kurds and Turks. According to Kehl-Bodrogi and Arakelova, "in spite of their distinct national identity and ethnic consciousness, Zazas never claimed their separate existence, as they have for centuries been surrounded by the Kurds, the people with a homogenous language and close culture. Therefore, in the ‘outer world’ they have always been under the shadow of the Kurdish ethnic and national prevalence, and during the last century and a half, it has been totally suppressed by the Kurd's political strivings manifested in numerous movements". According to some, Zazas generally consider themselves Kurds and are described as Kurds by some scholars. However, many Zazas do not see it that way and emphasize their own Zaza identity distinct from the Kurds. And various scholars consider Zazas as a separate ethnic group distinct from the Kurds and treat them as such in their academic work. According to a national survey conducted by KONDA Research and Consultancy in 2019 around 1.5% of the population state "Zaza" as their ethnic identity, thus forming the fourth largest ethnic identity in the country. According to a 2015 survey conducted in Turkish Kurdistan among voting-age adults, the majority of the Zazaki-speakers ethnically identified as "Zaza" in contrast to other options such as Kurdish, Turkish and Arabic.

== Politics ==
Politically, Zazas belonging to Alevism and Sunnism generally hold widely different views from each other. Since 2002 elections Sunni Zazas mostly voted for ruling Justice and Development Party both nationally and locally, meanwhile Alevi Zazas have shown wide support for left-wing or Kurdish-oriented parties, namely HDP and CHP. For the presidential elections Sunni Zazas were reported to be voting for Recep Tayyip Erdoğan, in contrast to the Alevis who mostly supported HDP's candidate Selahattin Demirtaş. Alevi-majority Tunceli is the only province in Turkey that has ever elected a mayor belonging to the Communist Party of Turkey. Many Zaza politicians are also to be found in the fraternal Kurdish parties of the Peoples' Democratic Party (HDP) and Democratic Regions Party (DBP), like Selahattin Demirtaş, Aysel Tuğluk, Ayla Akat Ata and Gültan Kışanak. On the other hand, Zazas who have publicly stated that they do not consider themselves Kurdish include Hüseyin Aygün, a CHP politician from Tunceli. Especially in recent years, the Zaza language and cultural associations have become widespread, the establishment of the Federation of Zaza Associations and the establishment of the Democracy Time Party have started to adopt Zaza identity more. Selahattin Demirtaş is also Zaza and can speak fluent Zazaki, and identifies as a Zaza Kurd. His brother, Nurettin Demirtaş, is a senior PKK member.

The first Zaza-oriented political party in the history of Turkey was established in 2017 under the name "Zaza People's Party" and later changed its name to Democracy Time Party (Turkish: Demokrasi Zamanı Partisi) due to legal restrictions on ethnicity-based parties.

=== Zaza nationalism ===
Zaza nationalism is an ideology that supports the preservation of Zaza people between Turks and Kurds in Turkey. Turkish nationalist Hasan Reşit Tankut proposed in 1961 to create a corridor between Zaza-speakers and Kurmanji-speakers to hasten Turkification. In some cases in the diaspora, Zazas turned to this ideology because of the more visible differences between them and Kurmanji-speakers. Zaza nationalism was further boosted when Turkey abandoned its assimilatory policies which made some Zazas begin considering themselves as a separate ethnic group. In the diaspora, some Zazas turned to Zaza nationalism in the freer European political climate. On this, Ebubekir Pamukchu, the founder of the Zaza national movement stated: "From that moment I became Zaza." Zaza nationalists fear Turkish and Kurdish influence and aim at protecting Zaza culture and language rather than seeking any kind of autonomy within Turkey.

According to researcher Ahmet Kasımoğlu, Zaza nationalism is a Turkish and Armenian attempt to divide Kurds.

== Genetics ==
A 2005 study genetically examined three different groups of Zaza (n= 27) and Kurmanji speakers in Turkey and Kurmanji speakers in Georgia. In the study, mtDNA HV1 sequences, eleven Y chromosome bi-allelic markers and 9 Y-STR loci were analyzed to investigate lineage relationship among these Iranian-speaking groups. According to study 8 different Y-DNA haplogroups have been identified among the Zaza speakers; I* (33.3%), R1a1a (25.9%), E* (11.1%) and R1* (11.1%) being the most prevalent ones. Haplogroups P1 and J2, which were found to be prevalent among differing Kurdish populations, were absent in Zaza speakers. Y chromosome data showed somewhat different patterns, indicating some effect of geography. Kurmanji speakers and Zaza speakers in Turkey, who are geographic neighbours, were found to be closer to each other compared to the Georgian and Turkmen Kurds according to Y-DNA data.

MtDNA data indicates close relationships among Zaza speaking groups from Turkey and Kurdish people from Georgia, Iran and Eastern Turkey, meanwhile the examined Kurmanji speakers in Turkey and Turkmenistan were different from these groups and each other maternally. Geographic neighbours of Zazas from South Caucasus are also found to be similar concerning mtDNA results. It was stated that there was no clear geographic or linguistic pattern concerning matrilineal origins of examined Iranian-speakers.

Another phenomenon found in the research was that Zazas are closer to Kurdish groups (matrilineally South Caucasian groups, patrilineally Kurmanji speakers in Turkey) rather than peoples of Northern Iran, where ancestral Zaza language hypothesized to be spoken before its spread to Anatolia. It was also stated that "the genetic evidence of course does not preclude a northern Iranian origin for the Zazaki language itself."

== See also ==
- Minorities in Turkey

== Bibliography ==
- Hadank, Karl (1932). Mundarten der Zâzâ, Hauptsächlich aus Siwerek und Kor. Berlin: Walter de Gruyter.
- Arakelova, Victoria (1999), "The Zaza People as a New Ethno-Political Factor in the Region", Iran & the Caucasus, 3/4: 397–408, doi:10.1163/157338499X00335, ISSN 1573-384X, JSTOR 4030804
- Asatrian, Garnik (1995), "DIMLĪ", Encyclopædia Iranica, VI (5): 405–411
- Werner, Eberhard (2017). Rivers and Mountains: A Historical, Applied Anthropological and Linguistical Study of the Zaza People of Turkey Including an Introduction to Applied Cultural Anthropology. Nuremberg: Verlag Fur Theologie Und Religionswissenschaft. ISBN 978-3957760654.
- Bozbuğa, Rasim (2019). Kimlikleşme kavşağında Zaza kimliği ve Zaza hareketi [Zaza Identity and Zaza Movement at Crossroads of Identity Formation] (PhD thesis) (in Turkish). Ankara: Gazi Üniversitesi.
- Paul, Ludwig (1998). "The Pozition of Zazaki the West Iranian Languages" (PDF). Iran Chamber. Open Publishing.
- Paul, Ludwig (2009). "Zazaki". In Windfuhr, Gernot (ed.). The Iranian Languages. New York: Routledge. ISBN 978-0-7007-1131-4.
- Andrews, Peter Alford (1989). Ethnic Groups in the Republic of Turkey. Wiesbaden: Reichert Verlag.
- Andranik (2023), Hakobian, Gohar G. (ed.), Dersim: Journey and Topography, Iran and the Caucasus Monographs, Leiden-Boston: Brill, ISBN 978-90-04-67775-3
- Bozbuğa, Rasim (2014), "Bilinmeyen Halk: Zazalar" [Unknown peoples: Zazas], Akademik Hassasiyetler, 1 (1): 50–68
- Barry, Maximilien-Étienne-Émile (1881), Maximilien-Étienne-Émile Barry, Mission scientifique de Mr. Ernest Chantre sous-directeur du Muséum de Lyon dans la haute Mésopotamie, le Kurdistan et le Caucase: 2018.R.23-38 Kurdes Zazas, Diarbékir (Kurdistan) (in English and French), Getty Research Institute, hdl:10020/cifa2018r23
- Bozdağ, Cem; Üngör, Uğur (2011), Zazas and zazaki, Zazaki.de, archived from the original on 4 March 2016
- Cengiz, Orhan Kemal (2011), "Can Kurds rely on the Turkish state?", Today's Zaman, archived from the original on 29 November 2014
- Dündar, Fuat (2000), Türkiye Nüfus Sayımlarında Azınlıklar (in Turkish), Chiviyazıları Yayınevi, ISBN 9758086774
- Endangered Language Alliance, "Zaza", elalliance.org
- Gippert, Jost (1999), Iranische Sprachen / Iranian Languages, Thesaurus Indogermanischer Text- und Sprachmaterialien (TITUS)
- Haber Türk (2013), Meclis'e sıçrayan polemi (in Turkish)
- Hürriyet (2013), Bese Hozat'ın annesi: Kızım gelirse 7 kurban keseceğim (in Turkish)
- Kalafat, Yaşar (1996). "Anadolu Türk Halk Sufizmi: Zazalar" (PDF) (in Turkish). Ankara: Dinler Tarihi Derneği Yayınları.
- Kasımoğlu, Ahmet (2012), "Xoybûn de cayê Kirdan" (PDF), II. Uluslararası Zaza Tarihi ve Kültürü Sempozyumu (in Dimli), Bingöl Üniversitesi Yayınları: 654–676
- Kaya, Mehmed S. (2009), The Zaza Kurds of Turkey : a Middle Eastern minority in a globalised society, London: Tauris Academic Studies, ISBN 9781845118754
- Kausen, Ernst (2006), Zaza (PDF) (in German), archived from the original (PDF) on 15 August 2011
- Kehl-Bodrogi; Otter-Beaujean; Kellner-Heikele (1997), Syncretistic religious communities in the Near East : collected papers of the international symposium "Alevism in Turkey and comparable syncretistic religious communities in the Near East in the past and present", Berlin, 14-17 April 1995, Leiden: Brill Publishing, ISBN 9789004108615
- Kehl-Bodrogi, Krisztina (October 1999), "Kurds, Turks, or a People in their own Right? Competing Collective Identities Among the Zazas", The Muslim World, 89 (3–4): 439–454, doi:10.1111/j.1478-1913.1999.tb02757.x
- Keskin, Mesut (2015), Zaza Dili (Zaza Language) (PDF) (in Turkish), vol. 1, Bingöl: Bingöl Üniversitesi Yaşayan Diller Enstitüsü Dergisi, archived from the original (PDF) on 7 June 2020
- Köhler, herausgegeben von Bärbel (1998), Religion und Wahrheit : religionsgeschichtliche Studien : Festschrift für Gernot Wiessner zum 65. Geburtstag, Wiesbaden: Harrassowitz, pp. 385–399, ISBN 978-3447039758
- Lezgîn, Roşan (2010), "Among Social Kurdish Groups – General Glance at Zazas", Zazaki.net
- Malmîsanij, Mehemed (1996), Kırd, Kırmanc, Dımıli veya Zaza Kürtleri (in Turkish and Dimli), Deng, pp. 1–43
- Milliyet (2013). "Sakine Cansız Zazaca ağıtlarla toprağa verildi" (in Turkish).
- Mosaki, Nodar (14 March 2012). "The Zazas: a kurdish sub-ethnic group or separate people?". zazaki.net.
- Nasidze, Ivan; Quinque, Dominique; Ozturk, Murat; Bendukidze, Nina; Stoneking, Mark (2005), "MtDNA and Y-chromosome Variation in Kurdish Groups", Annals of Human Genetics, 69 (4): 401–412, doi:10.1046/j.1529-8817.2005.00174.x, ISSN 0003-4800, PMID 15996169, S2CID 23771698
- Özoğlu, Hakan (2004), Kurdish notables and the Ottoman state : evolving identities, competing loyalties, and shifting boundaries, Albany: State University of New York Press, ISBN 978-0-7914-5993-5
- Postgate (2007), Languages of Iraq, ancient and modern. (PDF), Cambridge: British School of Archaeology in Iraq, ISBN 978-0-903472-21-0
- Taylor, J. G. (1865), "Travels in Kurdistan, with Notices of the Sources of the Eastern and Western Tigris, and Ancient Ruins in Their Neighbourhood", Journal of the Royal Geographical Society of London, 35: 21–58, doi:10.2307/3698077, JSTOR 3698077
- van Bruinessen, Martin (1989), The Ethnic Identity of the Kurds in Turkey, pp. 613–621
- Werner, Eberhard (2012), "Considerations about the religions of the Zaza people" (PDF), II. Uluslararası Zaza Tarihi ve Kültürü Sempozyumu (in Dimli), Bingöl Üniversitesi Yayınları
- Ziflioğlu, Vercihan (23 May 2011). "Turkey's Zaza gearing up efforts for recognition of rights". Istanbul. Hürriyet Daily News. Archived from the original on 22 June 2015.
