= Hollwinkel Wood =

Coordinates: 52°19′39″N 8°32′32″E

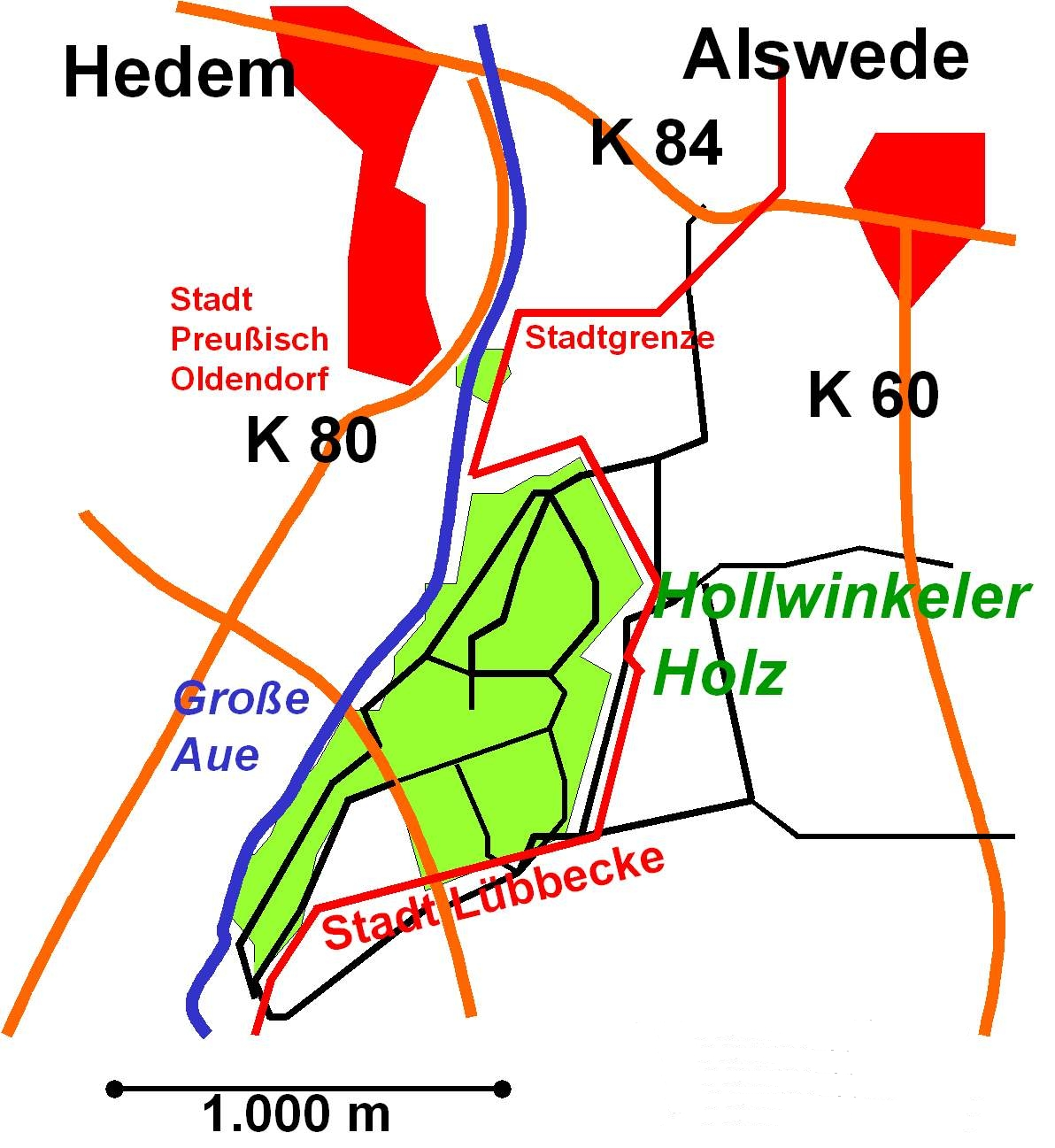
Location of Hollwinkel Wood. The wood itself is bounded by the town limits (Stadtgrenze) and the Große Aue river.

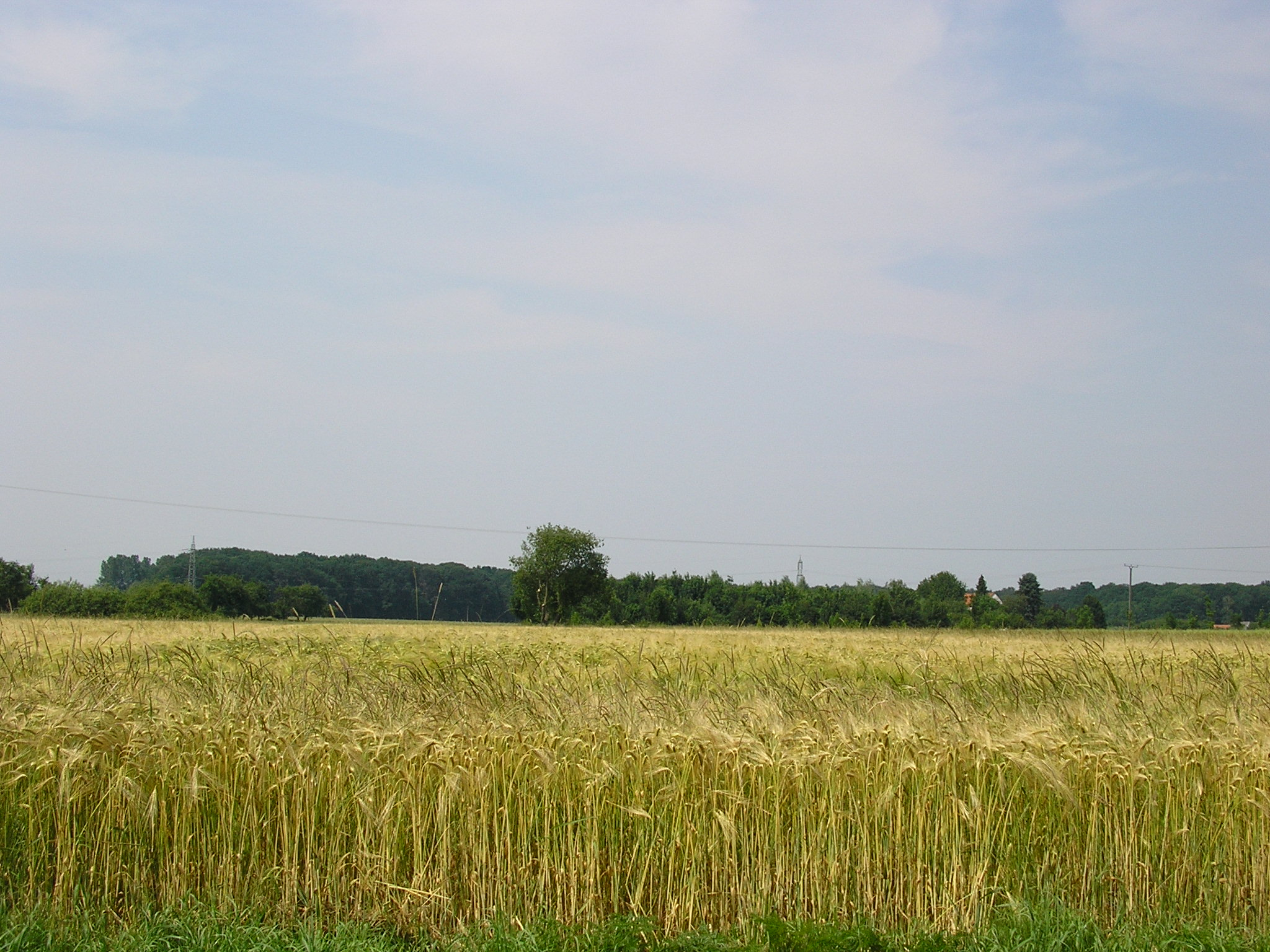
Hollwinkel Wood seen from the southeast

Hollwinkel Wood (German: Hollwinkeler Holz) is a woodland area that lies mainly on the territory of the borough of Preußisch Oldendorf in the North German county of Minden-Lübbecke. Within the wood the terrain is almost entirely level, lying between 50 and 52 metres above sea level (NN). A negligible piece of woodland in the south of only about 0.58 hectares belongs to the town of Lübbecke. With a wooded area of 47 hectares it is the largest stretch of woodland between the Wiehen Hills and the Mittelland Canal within the county of Minden-Lübbecke and also the largest wood in the borough of Preußisch Oldendorf north of the Wiehen, and Egge. In addition there is no woodland anywhere near this size within a radius of 4.5 km (i.e. 63 km^{2} of the surrounding area). The wood measures around 1.3 km from northeast to southwest and, at its widest point, around 700 metres (2,300 ft) from east to west. Hollwinkel Wood is bounded in the west by the Große Aue river and in the east by the boundary of the borough of Lübbecke. The Mehner Bach stream flows through the wood in the far northeast. In the northwest of the wood is a 0.25 hectare pond with a small island.

The wood is almost purely deciduous forest. Around 4 kilometres (2.5 miles) of walking trails and forest tracks make it a popular recreation area for the surrounding towns and villages. A road crosses the wood from northwest to southeast in its southern region thus enabling it to join the K 80 state road (Kreisstraße) in the west. The importance of this relatively small area of woodland derives from the fact that the county of Minden-Lübbecke is one of the least forested districts in Westphalia, only 10.6% of its area being forested. The Wiehen foothills in particular to the north are intensively farmed and have few large areas of woodland.
