= Pamuklu, Çermik =

Village in Turkey

Coordinates: 38.0435°N 39.2955°E

Pamuklu
- Neighbourhood
- Location in Turkey
- Coordinates
- Country: Turkey
- Province: Diyarbakır
- District: Çermik
- Population (2022): 282
- Time zone: UTC+3 (TRT)

Pamuklu is a neighbourhood in the municipality and district of Çermik, Diyarbakır Province in Turkey. Its population is 282 (2022).
