= Ferdinand Hennerbichler =

Austrian historian, philologist and Kurdologist

Ferdinand Hennerbichler (born 1946) is an Austrian historian, philologist, anthropologist, and a prominent Kurdologist. He is also a former diplomat and journalist.

== Biography ==
Hennerbichler was born in Linz, Upper Austria on November 6, 1946. He finished high school studies in Linz in 1965. Between 1965 and 1972 he attended the University of Vienna where he studied history, philology, linguistics, archaeology, psychology & philosophy. He obtained Doctor of Philosophy in Linguistics in 1972.

== Kurdish studies ==
Hennerbichler has been studying History of the Kurds, Kurdish language, and Kurdish culture since 1970s and has published over 500 academic articles and research papers, and several books about the Kurds ranging from history to the genetic studies. He is also one of the founders of the Austrian Association for Kurdish Studies/ European Center for Kurdish Studies. Between 2012 - 2020 he taught Kurdology at the University of Sulaymaniyah in Iraqi Kurdistan. His latest book titled The Origin of the Kurds: First Interdisciplinary Study "Die Herkunft der Kurden: interdisziplinäre Studie" is regarded as one of the thorough and well-founded studies about the Kurdish people and has been incorporated into the teaching program of the historical-anthropological studies by The Institute for Historical Anthropology in Vienna.

== Armenian studies ==
Hennerbichler has contributed to the studies on the Armenian genocide and together with Maria Anna Six-Hohenbalken and Thomas Schmidinger have published a book in German on the Armenian and Kurdish genocides in Turkey titled "100 Jahre Volkermord an Armenierinnen Und Die Kurdinnen."

== Diplomatic and humanitarian missions ==
From 1980 to 1983 he served as the Middle East Assistant of Austrian Chancellor Bruno Kreisky. In 1981/82, 1983, 1984 he led delegations of International Rescue Operation to Iraq and managed to free eleven hostages of seven European countries following several rounds of negotiations with the Iraqi government.

== Journalism ==
Between 1967-1990 Hennerbichler also worked, with breaks, for Austrian Broadcasting Corporation ORF. Between 1976-1990 he was Foreign Correspondent and worked in various regions and continents Europe, CEE, Middle East, and Latin America.

== Research projects ==
Hennerbichler has undertaken several research projects encompassing anthropology and genetics of the Kurds, Middle Eastern affairs, and documentation of Anfal campaign and Genocide of Yazidis by the Islamic State.

== Honors and decorations ==
- Ibrahim Ahmed Prize 2017
- Ordre national de la Légion d'honneur (Officier), President François Mitterrand, France, 1986
- Phoenix Order (Commander), President Constantine Karamanlis, Greece, 1984
- Order of Merit for Services rendered to the Republic of Austria, Chancellor Bruno Kreisky, 1982
- Order of Merit for Services rendered to the County of Styria, Governor Josef Krainer jun., 1982
- Honour and Gratitude of the German Government, Foreign Minister Hans-Dietrich Genscher
- Humanitarian Medal of Baden-Wuerttemberg (Germany)
- Human Rights Bravery (Rotary Club Vienna

== Publications ==
- 1972 Doctoral Dissertation: Historical Terminology: Der Begriff Gegenreformation etc. (Doctorate Supervisor: Heinrich Lutz, 1922-1986; Co-Thesis Supervisor: Erich Zöllner, 1916-1996), University of Vienna, Department of History.
- 1979 Interview mit dem iranischen Scharfrichter Chalchali. In: Der Spiegel Nr. 50 (1979) 142-143; also in: ORF-Nachlese 12 (1979) 44-45.
- 1980 Iran's Kurdish Rebellion and its Leaders. In: Swiss Review of World Affairs (A monthly publication of the Neue Zürcher Zeitung), Vol. XXIX, no. 12, March 1980, 20-22.
- 1982 Der kurdische Widerstand 1975-1982/83, Bericht, ÖB-London-BMfAA Wien, 13. Dezember 1982, pp. 44.
- 1986 Die Kurden. Staatenlos in verbrannter Heimat. INTERNATIONAL 1/86. Vienna.
- 1986 Some Aspects of the Restoration of the Kurdish People's Movement after 1975. In: International Conference of Labour and Social History (ITH). 22 Conference 1986. Report 23. – Vienna: Europaverlag, 176-181.
- 1987 The Kurds. In: Wiener Zeitung, Features, 16 parts.
- 1988 Die für die Freiheit sterben. Geschichte des kurdischen Volkes. Preface by Bruno Kreisky. Vienna: Österreichische Staatsdruckerei.
- 1988 Kurdische Giftgasopfer aus dem Irak in temporären Aufnahmelagern der Türkei 1988. Lager Süüstü bei Yüksekova. Augenzeugen-Bericht. 13. September 1988.
- 1992 Österreich und die Kurden. In: Azadi, Freiheit in den Bergen: Schallaburg, 17. Mai - 1. November 1992. Eds. Alfred Janata et al. Vienna: Amt der Niederösterreichischen Landesregierung 1992, 206-214.
- 1994 Die für die Freiheit sterben. Geschichte des kurdischen Volkes. published by Verlag Österreich
- 2004 Die Kurden (History of the Kurdish People). Mosonmagyaróvár: A&H Bt. / Edition FHE, 2004, pp. 701, ISBN 963-214-575-5 (out of print).
- 2010 Die Herkunft der Kurden. Interdisziplinäre Studie. Reihe: Historisch-anthropologi-sche Studien. Schriftenreihe des Instituts für Historische Anthropologie in Wien. Hrsg. von Hubert-Christian Ehalt. Band 23.Frankfurt am Main, Berlin, Bern, Brüssel, New York, Oxford, Wien: Peter Lang, ISBN 978-3-631-59327-1
- 2010 Origin of the Kurds. Vienna Lecture, 2010, excerpts. In: Proceedings of the Russian Academy of DNA Genealogy, vol. 3, no. 12 (December), 2010, 2220-2244; Foreword by Anatole A. Klyosov.
- 2011 The Origin of the Kurds. Lecture. – Borsdorf: Edition winterwork, 2011.
- 2011 Arie Lova Eliav and Bruno Kreisky's Middle East peace negotiations Israel-PLO (in German). In: Maimann, Helene: Über Kreisky. Gespräche aus Distanz und Nähe. Wien: Falter Verlag, 2011, 136-141.
- 2013 Assassination of Abdul Rahman Ghassemlou (1930-1989). New Assessment. In: Vienna Kurdish Studies Yearbook, ed. by F. Hennerbichler, Th. Schmidinger, M. Six-Hohenbalken, Chr. Osztovics, vol. 1/2013, Vienna: Wiener Verlag, pp. 288–321.
- 2013 The Future of the Kurdish Question in the Middle East. Lecture. II. International Tunceli (Dersim) Symposium, 20–22 September 2013, University of Tunceli (Dersim), Turkey.
