= Eberhard Werner (theologian) =

German anthropologist and linguist (1966–2023)

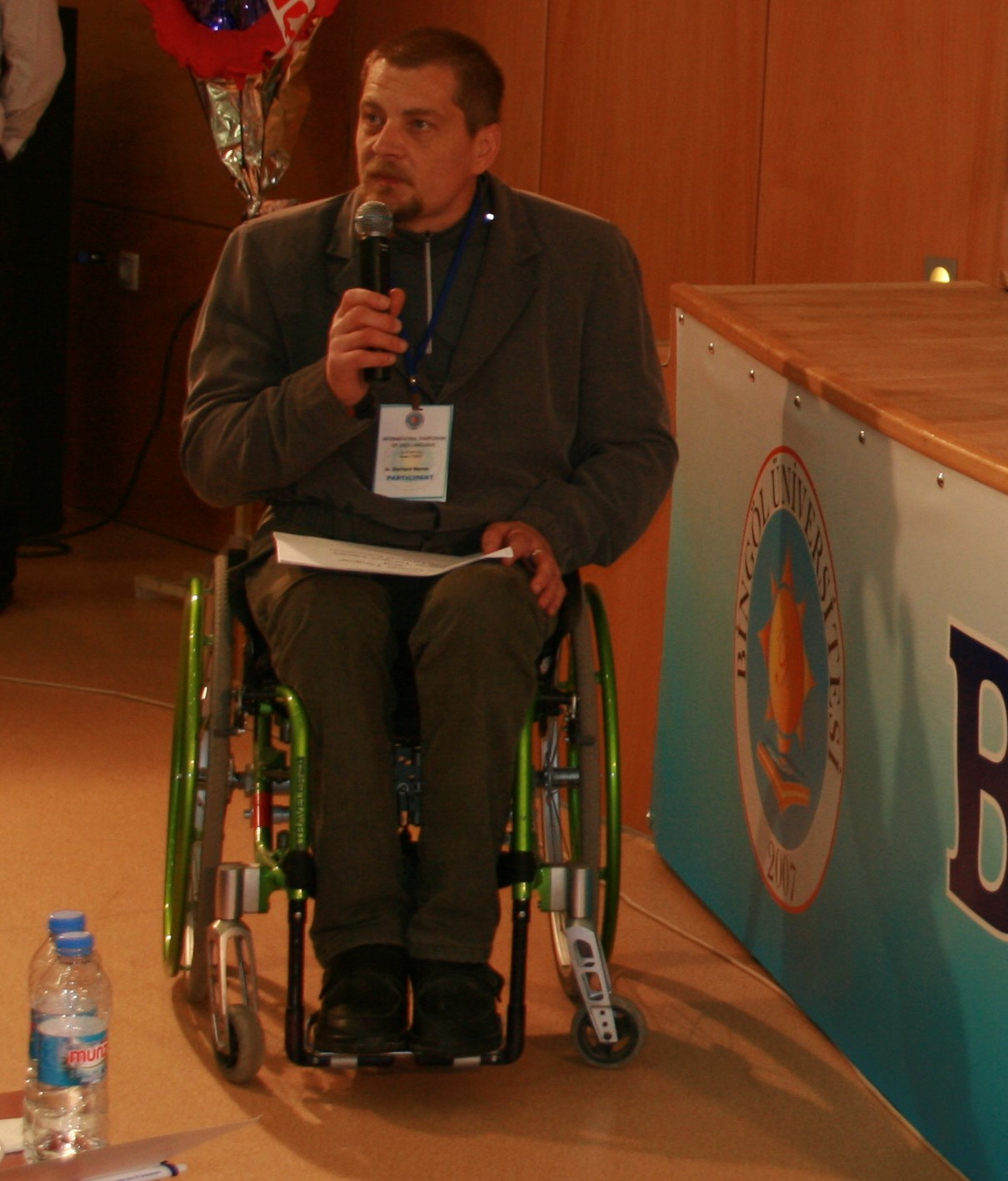
- Werner in 2011
- Born: 21 March 1966
- Died: 4 August 2023 (aged 57)
- Occupation: Anthropologist and linguist
- Language: German

Eberhard Werner (21 March 1966 – 4 August 2023) was a German theologian.

Werner was from the region of Swabia. Together with his wife Brigitte Werner (linguist), he extensively engaged with the Zaza language from the 2000s. They conducted seminars on the Zaza language, authored articles about Zazaki and Zaza culture. They initially learned Zazaki in Pülümür-Erzincan and later focused more on South Zazaki (Çermik-Siverek-Gerger).

In 2017, Werner published a book about the Zaza language in English titled "Rivers and Mountains", which presented Zaza culture and language in an anthropological context. This academic work significantly contributed to anthropological research about the Zazas.

In 2012, he published a book in German titled "Bibelübersetzung – Schnittstelle zwischen Kulturen: Zusammenhänge dargestellt an der Sprache und Kultur der Zaza" (Translation of the Bible - Interface between Cultures: Connections Illustrated by the Language and Culture of the Zazas). This book addressed the translation of the Bible and showcased connections between cultures through the Zaza language and culture.

Werner published a series of articles about Zaza language and culture.

Eberhard Werner died from a cardiac arrest on 4 August 2023, at the age of 57.
