= Eberhard Werner (artist) =

German artist and landscapist

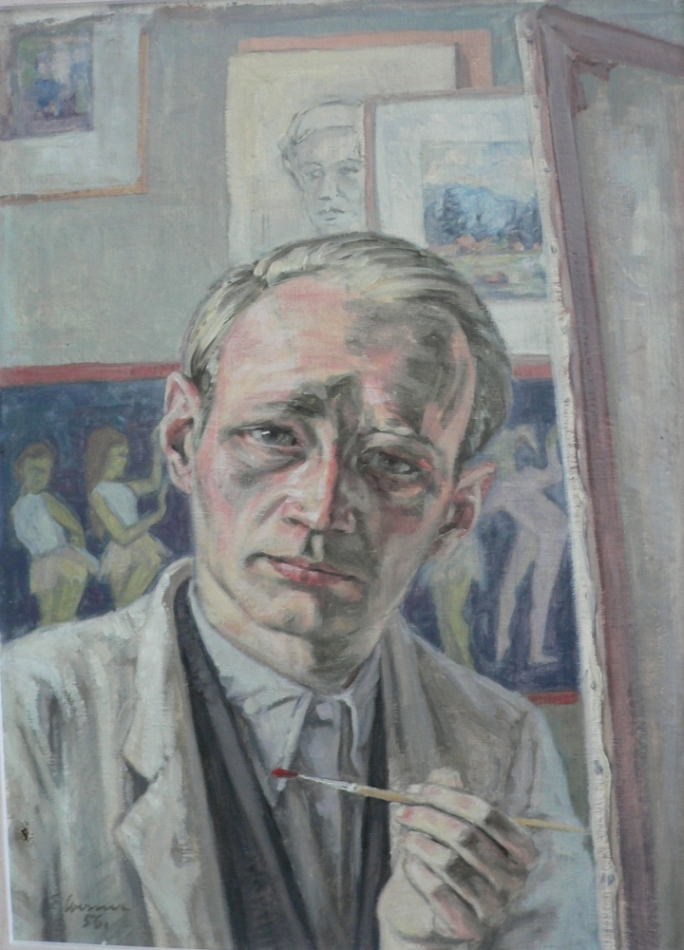
Werner self-portrait 1956

Fritz Eberhard Werner (8 August 1924 – 23 September 2002) was a German artist and landscapist.

== Life ==
Eberhard Werner was born in Glogau/Schlesien, the son of Friedrich Werner, a newspaper publisher and printer. After his battlefield injury that stemmed from the World War II was cured, he became a teacher in the GDR in Gransee and studied Art in Erfurt.

Although he was quite successful as an artist, he left the GDR in 1959 due to political-artistic restrictions. Werner was reluctant to accept the commercialization of art.

He died in Lübbecke.

== Gallery of selected works ==
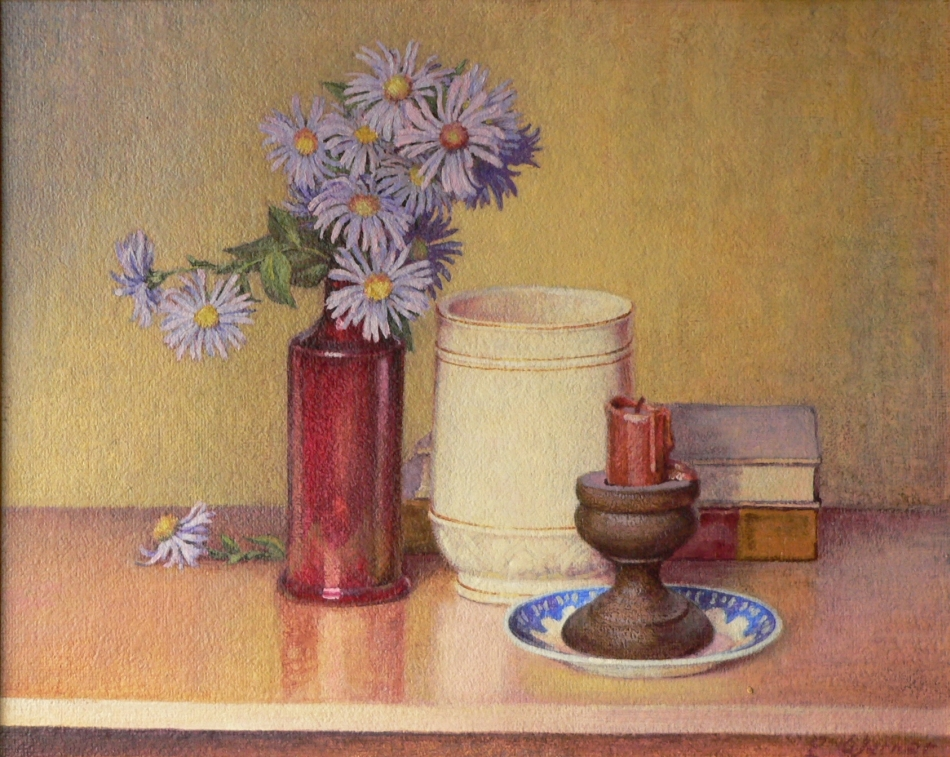

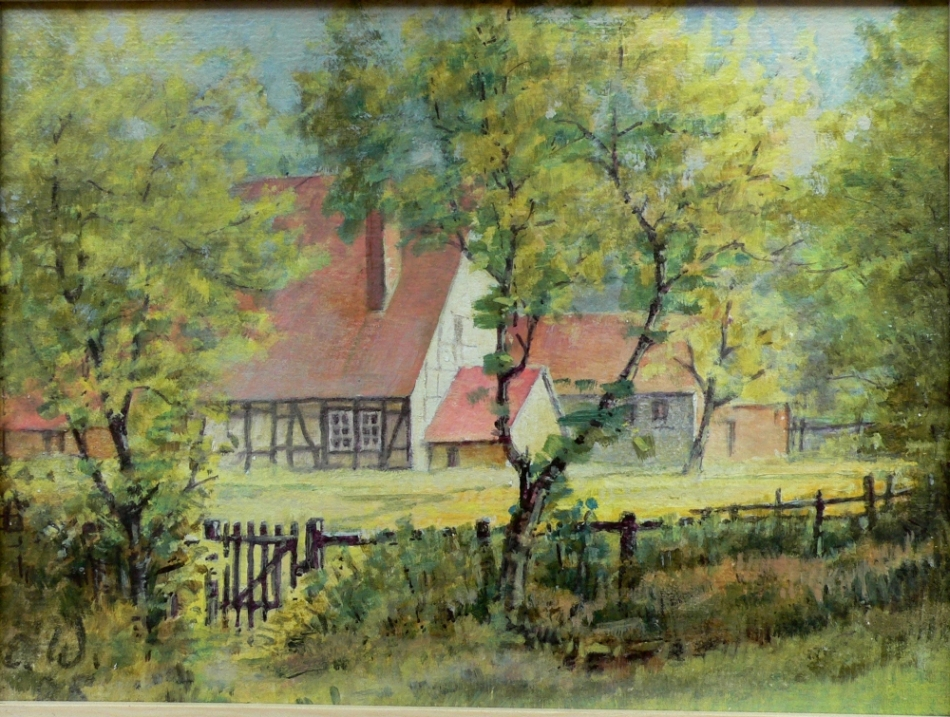

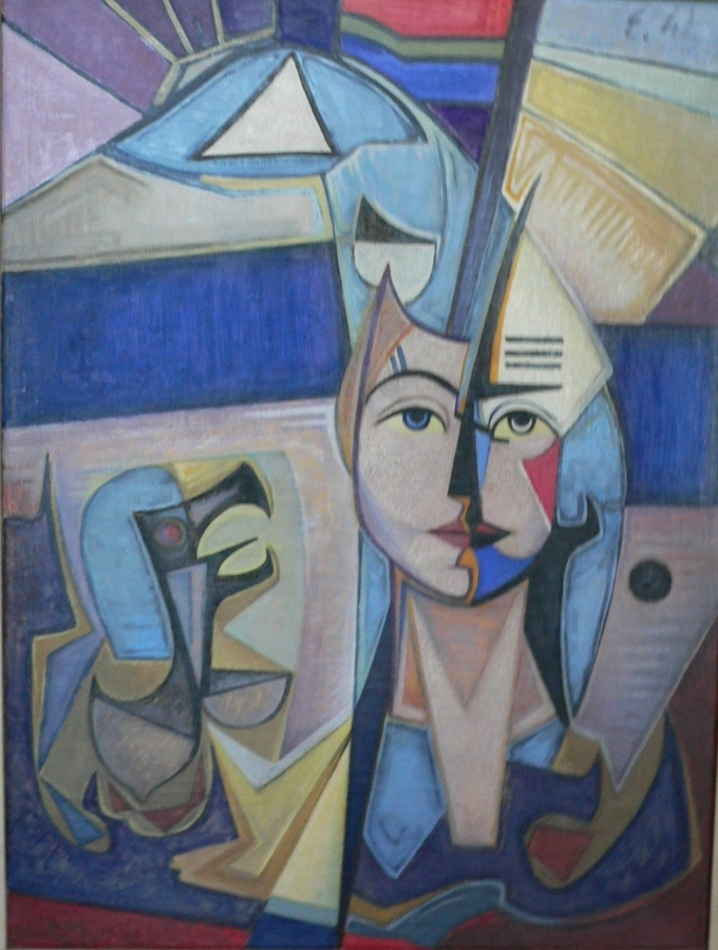

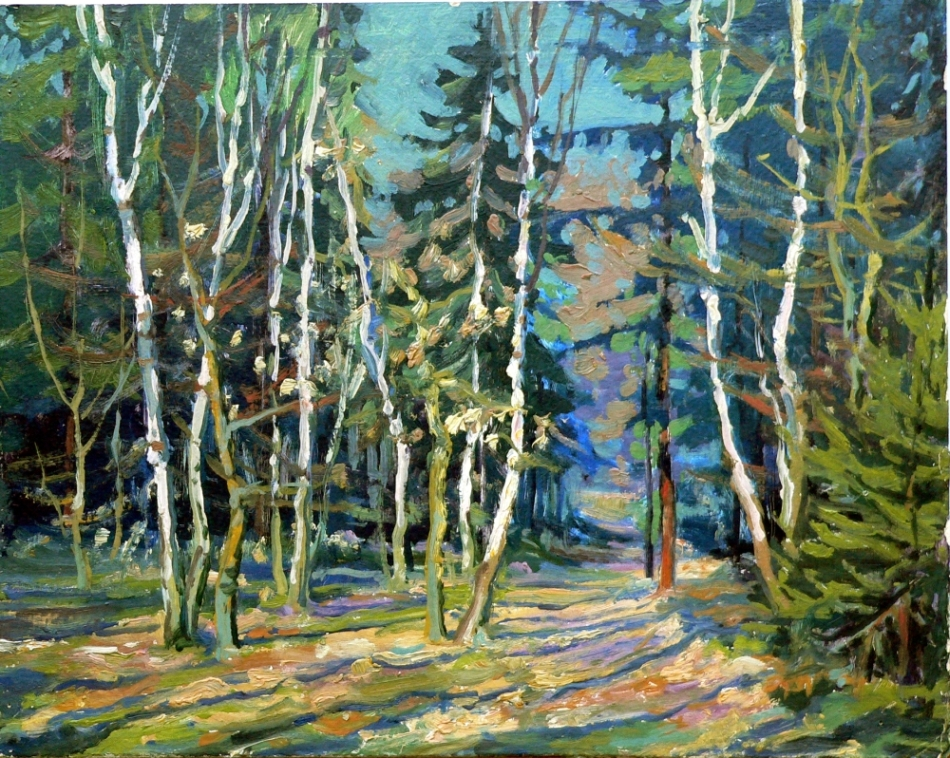

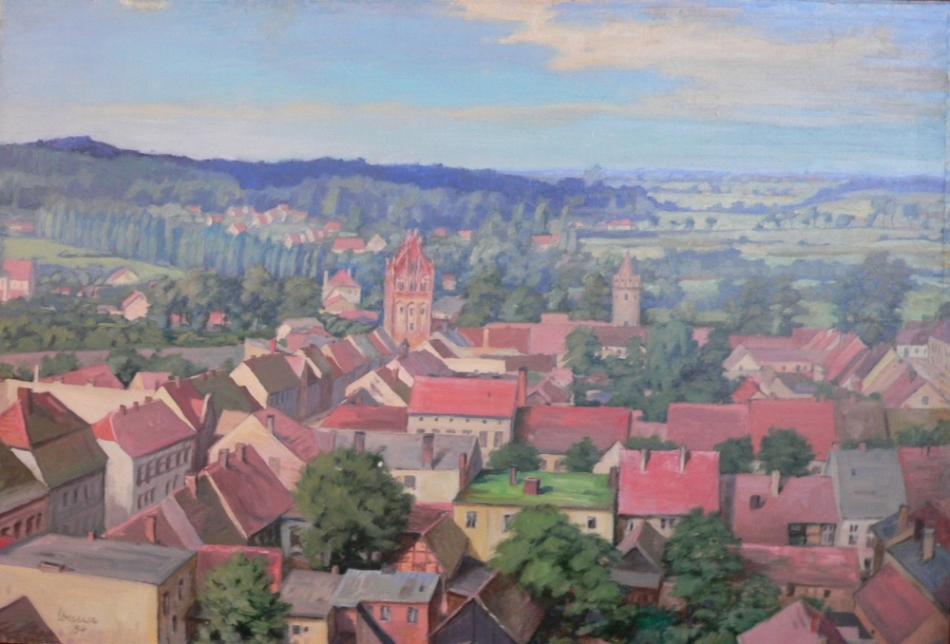

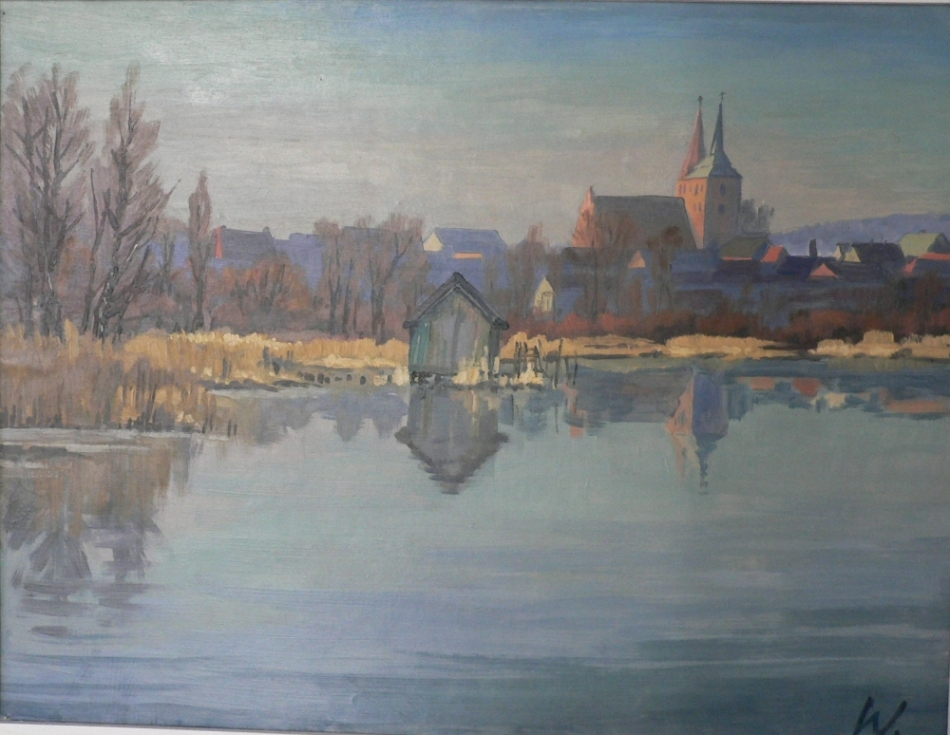
