= Amirabad =

Amirabad may refer to:

== Bangladesh ==
- Amirabad Union, Lohagara, a union of Chittagong Division
- Amirabad Estate, Faridpur, zamindar estate in Faridpur District
- Amirabad railway station, a railway station in Faridpur District

== Iran ==
=== Ardabil Province ===
- Amirabad, Ardabil, a village in Ardabil County
- Amirabad, Kowsar, a village in Kowsar County

=== Chaharmahal and Bakhtiari Province ===
- Amirabad, Kiar, a village in Kiar County
- Amirabad, Kuhrang, a village in Kuhrang County
- Amirabad, Bazoft, a village in Kuhrang County

=== East Azerbaijan Province ===
- Amirabad, Charuymaq, a village in Charuymaq County
- Amirabad, Kaleybar, a village in Kaleybar County
- Amirabad, Maragheh, a village in Maragheh County
- Amirabad, Marand, a village in Marand County
- Amirabad, Garmeh-ye Jonubi, a village in Meyaneh County
- Amirabad, Sheykhdarabad, a village in Meyaneh County
- Amirabad, Varzaqan, a village in Varzaqan County

=== Fars Province ===
- Amirabad, Abadeh, a village in Abadeh County
- Amirabad Kaftar, a village in Eqlid County
- Amirabad-e Karbalayi Khosrow, a village in Eqlid County
- Amirabad-e Panjahopanj, a village in Sarvestan County
- Amirabad-e Panjahoshesh, a village in Sarvestan County
- Amirabad, Sepidan, a village in Sepidan County
- Amirabad, Shiraz, a village in Shiraz County

=== Gilan Province ===
- Amirabad, Gilan, a village in Lahijan County

=== Golestan Province ===
- Amirabad, Golestan, a village in Gorgan County
- Amirabad-e Fenderesk, a village in Aliabad County
- Amirabad-e Sorkh Mahalleh, a village in Aliabad County

=== Hamadan Province ===
- Amirabad-e Ali Nur, a village in Famenin County
- Amirabad-e Kord, a village in Hamadan County
- Amirabad, Kabudarahang, a village in Kabudarahang County
- Amirabad, Nahavand, a village in Nahavand County
- Amirabad, Khezel, a village in Nahavand County
- Amirabad, alternate name of Badiabad, Hamadan, a village in Nahavand County
- Amirabad, alternate name of Oshvand, a village in Nahavand County
- Amirabad, Razan, a village in Razan County

=== Hormozgan Province ===
- Amirabad, Hormozgan, a village in Minab County

=== Isfahan Province ===
- Amirabad, Ardestan, a village in Ardestan County
- Amirabad, Semirom, a village in Semirom County
- Amirabad, Padena, a village in Semirom County

=== Kerman Province ===
==== Anbarabad County ====
- Amirabad, Anbarabad, a village
- Amirabad-e Bala, a village
- Amirabad-e Kot Gorg, a village
- Amirabad-e Nazarian, a village
- Amirabad-e Pain, Kerman, a village

==== Arzuiyeh County ====
- Amirabad-e Yek, a village
- Amirabad Rural District (Arzuiyeh County), an administrative division

==== Baft County ====
- Amirabad (eastern Baft), a village
- Amirabad (western Baft), a village

==== Bam County ====
- Amirabad, Bam, a village

==== Jazmirian County ====
- Amirabad, a village merged with three others to form the city of Zeh-e Kalut

==== Jiroft County ====
- Amirabad, Maskun, a village
- Amirabad, Saghder, a village

==== Kerman County ====
- Amirabad, Qanatghestan, a village
- Amirabad, Shahdad, a village

==== Rabor County ====
- Amirabad, Rabor, a village

==== Sirjan County ====
- Amirabad, Malekabad, a village
- Amirabad, Pariz, a village
- Amirabad-e Amirqoli, a village

=== Kermanshah Province ===
- Amirabad, Kermanshah, a village in Kermanshah County
- Amirabad, Kuzaran, a village in Kermanshah County
- Amirabad, Dinavar, a village in Sahneh County
- Amirabad, Kanduleh, a village in Sahneh County

=== Khuzestan Province ===
- Amirabad, Izeh, a village in Izeh County
- Amirabad, Dehdez, a village in Izeh County
- Amirabad, Tolbozan, a village in Masjed Soleyman County
- Amirabad, Tombi Golgir, a village in Masjed Soleyman County

=== Kohgiluyeh and Boyer-Ahmad Province ===
- Amirabad-e Babakan, a village in Boyer-Ahmad County
- Amirabad-e Olya, a village in Boyer-Ahmad County
- Amirabad-e Sofla, a village in Boyer-Ahmad County
- Amirabad-e Vosta Key Mohammad Khan, a village in Boyer-Ahmad County
- Amirabad, Dana, a village in Dana County
- Amirabad, Kohgiluyeh, a village in Kohgiluyeh County

=== Kurdistan Province ===
- Amirabad, Bijar, a village in Bijar County
- Amirabad, Dehgolan, a village in Dehgolan County
- Amirabad, Bolbanabad, a village in Dehgolan County
- Amirabad, Kamyaran, a village in Kamyaran County
- Amirabad Rural District, in Kamyaran County

=== Lorestan Province ===
==== Borujerd County ====
- Amirabad, Borujerd, a village in Borujerd County

==== Delfan County ====
- Gashur-e Amirabad, a village in Delfan County

==== Dorud County ====
- Amirabad (northern Dorud), a village in Dorud County
- Amirabad (southern Dorud), a village in Dorud County

==== Dowreh County ====
- Amirabad Cham Gaz, a village in Dowreh County

==== Khorramabad County ====
- Amirabad, Khorramabad

==== Selseleh County ====
- Amirabad, Selseleh
- Amirabad-e Nadar
- Amirabad Haq Nader

=== Markazi Province ===
- Amirabad, Ashtian, a village in Ashtian County
- Amirabad, Farahan, a village in Farahan County
- Amirabad, Khomeyn, a village in Khomeyn County
- Amirabad, Mahallat, a village in Mahallat County
- Amirabad-e Bezanjan, a village in Mahallat County
- Amirabad, Zarandieh, a village in Zarandieh County

=== Mazandaran Province ===
- Amirabad, Amol, a village in Amol County
- Amirabad, Behshahr, a village in Behshahr County
- Amirabad, Nur, a village in Nur County
- Amirabad, Savadkuh, a village in Savadkuh County
- Amirabad, Tonekabon, a village in Tonekabon County

=== North Khorasan Province ===
- Amirabad, Bojnord, a village in Bojnord County
- Amirabad, Faruj, a village in Faruj County
- Amirabad, Jajrom, a village in Jajrom County
- Amirabad, Shirvan, a village in Shirvan County

=== Qazvin Province ===
- Amirabad, Qazvin
- Amirabad-e Eqbal
- Amirabad-e Kohneh
- Amirabad-e Now
- Amirabad, alternate name of Chaman-e Amirabad

=== Razavi Khorasan Province ===
- Amirabad, Chenaran, a village in Chenaran County
- Amirabad, Firuzeh, a village in Firuzeh County
- Amirabad, Kalat, a village in Kalat County
- Amirabad, Mashhad, a village in Mashhad County
- Amirabad, Ahmadabad, a village in Mashhad County
- Amirabad, Razaviyeh, a village in Mashhad County
- Amirabad, Miyan Jolgeh, a village in Nishapur County
- Amirabad, Torbat-e Heydarieh, a village in Torbat-e Heydarieh County
- Amirabad, Torbat-e Jam, a village in Torbat-e Jam County

=== Semnan Province ===
- Amirabad, Semnan, a village in Adaran County
- Amirabad, former name of Amiriyeh, a city in Damghan County
- Amirabad, Shahrud, a village in Shahrud County
- Amirabad District, in Damghan County

=== Sistan and Baluchestan Province ===
- Amirabad, Qasr-e Qand, a village in Qasr-e Qand County

=== South Khorasan Province ===
- Amirabad-e Pain, South Khorasan, a village in Birjand County
- Amirabad-e Sheybani, a village in Birjand County
- Amirabad, Darmian, a village in Darmian County
- Amirabad, Qaen, a village in Qaen County
- Amirabad-e Sarzeh, a village in Sarbisheh County
- Amirabad, Dastgerdan, a village in Tabas County
- Amirabad, Deyhuk, a village in Tabas County
- Amirabad, Zirkuh, a village in Zirkuh County

=== Tehran Province ===
- Amirabad, Tehran, a village in Malard County
- Amirabad, Varamin, a village in Varamin County
- Amirabad-e Kolahchi, a village in Malard County
- Amirabad, alternate name of Qeshlaq-e Amirabad, a village in Malard County

=== West Azerbaijan Province ===
- Amirabad, Bukan, a village in Bukan County
- Amirabad, Miandoab, a village in Miandoab County
- Amirabad, Oshnavieh, a village in Oshnavieh County

=== Yazd Province ===
- Amirabad, Aliabad, a village in Taft County
- Amirabad, Nir, a village in Taft County

=== Zanjan Province ===
- Amirabad, Abhar, a village in Abhar County
- Amirabad, Sain Qaleh, a village in Abhar County
- Amirabad, Soltaniyeh, a village in Abhar County
- Amirabad, Mahneshan, a village in Mahneshan County
- Amirabad, Anguran, a village in Mahneshan County

== Pakistan ==
- Amirabad, Pakistan, a town in Khyber-Pakhtunkhwa

== See also ==
- Mirabad (disambiguation)
