= Mirabad =

Mirabad (Persian: ميراباد) may refer to:

== Afghanistan ==
- Mirabad, Afghanistan, a town in Helmand Province

== Iran ==
=== Hormozgan Province ===
- Mirabad, Hormozgan, a village in Minab County

=== Isfahan Province ===
- Mirabad, Buin va Miandasht, a village in Buin va Miandasht County
- Mirabad, Mobarakeh, a village in Mobarakeh County
- Mirabad, Shahreza, a village in Shahreza County
- Mirabad, alternate name of Maran, Isfahan, a village in Shahreza County
- Mirabad, Tiran and Karvan, a village in Tiran and Karvan County

=== Kerman Province ===
- Mirabad, alternate name of Amirabad-e Nazarian, a village in Anbarabad County
- Mirabad-e Abadi, a village in Anbarabad County
- Mirabad-e Ansari, a village in Fahraj County
- Mirabad-e Emam Qoli, a village in Fahraj County
- Mirabad, Narmashir, a village in Narmashir County
- Mirabad-e Chah-e Malek, a village in Rigan County
- Mirabad-e Rigan, a village in Rigan County

=== Kermanshah Province ===
- Mirabad, Kermanshah, a village in Salas-e Babajani County

=== Kurdistan Province ===
- Mirabad-e Olya, a village in Baneh County
- Mirabad-e Sofla, a village in Baneh County
- Mirabad, Dehgolan, a village in Dehgolan County
- Mirabad, Marivan, a village in Marivan County
- Mirabad, Saqqez, a village in Saqqez County

=== Lorestan Province ===
- Mirabad, Dorud, a village in Dorud County
- Mirabad, Khorramabad, a village in Khorramabad County
- Mirabad, Selseleh, a village in Selseleh County

=== Markazi Province ===
- Mirabad, Markazi, a village in Arak County, Markazi Province

=== Qom Province ===
- Mirabad, Qom, a village in Qom Province

=== Razavi Khorasan Province ===
- Mirabad, Khalilabad, a village in Khalilabad County
- Mirabad (36°13′ N 58°40′ E), Mazul, a village in Nishapur County
- Mirabad (36°18′ N 58°49′ E), Mazul, a village in Nishapur County
- Mirabad, Rivand, a village in Nishapur County
- Mirabad, Zaveh, a village in Zaveh County

=== Sistan and Baluchestan Province ===
- Mirabad, Bampur, a village in Bampur County
- Mirabad, Chabahar, a village in Chabahar County
- Mirabad, Irandegan, a village in Khash County
- Mirabad, Qasr-e Qand, a village in Qasr-e Qand County

=== South Khorasan Province ===
- Mirabad, Boshruyeh, a village in Boshruyeh County
- Mirabad, Darmian, a village in Darmian County
- Mirabad, Nehbandan, a village in Nehbandan County
- Mirabad, Zirkuh, a village in Zirkuh County

=== West Azerbaijan Province ===
- Mirabad, West Azerbaijan, a city in Sardasht County
- Mirabad, Chaldoran, a village in Chaldoran County
- Mirabad, Naqadeh, a village in Naqadeh County
- Mirabad, Oshnavieh, a village in Oshnavieh County
- Mirabad, Salmas, a village in Salmas County
- Mirabad, Urmia, a village in Urmia County
- Mirabad, Dasht, a village in Urmia County
- Mirabad, Margavar, a village in Urmia County
- Mirabad, Sumay-ye Beradust, a village in Urmia County

== Pakistan ==
- Mirabad, Pakistan, a town in Tando Allahyar District of Sindh

== See also ==
- Mehrabad (disambiguation)
- Mirobod, a city district of Tashkent, Uzbekistan
- Amirabad (disambiguation)
