= Pa Deh, Semnan =

Village in Semnan province, Iran

Pa Deh Persian: پاده
- Village
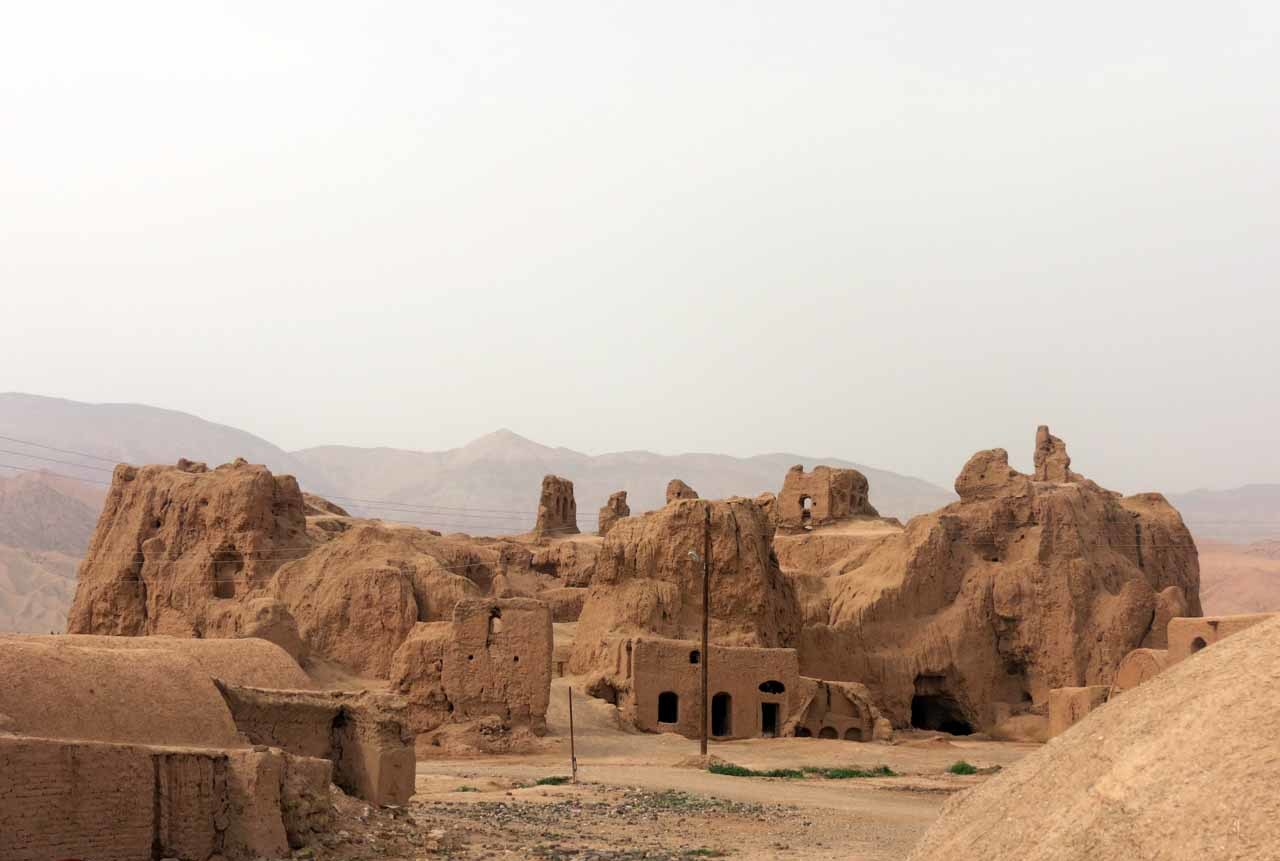
- Pa Deh Castle

- Location within Iran
- Coordinates: 35°15′08″N 52°32′13″E
- Country: Iran
- Province: Semnan
- County: Aradan
- District: Kohanabad
- Rural District: Faravan

Population (2016)
  - Total: 125
- Time zone: UTC+3:30 (IRST)

Pa Deh (Persian: پاده) (Note: Also romanized as Pā Deh) is a village in Faravan Rural District of Kohanabad District in Aradan County, Semnan province, Iran.

== Demographics ==
=== Population ===
At the time of the 2006 National Census, the village's population was 172 in 48 households, when it was in Kohanabad Rural District of the former Aradan District in Garmsar County. The following census in 2011 counted 170 people in 57 households. The 2016 census measured the population of the village as 125 people in 44 households, by which time the district had been separated from the county in the establishment of Aradan County. The rural district was transferred to the new Central District, and later in the same year was separated from the district in the formation of Kohanabad District. Pa Deh was transferred to Faravan Rural District created in the new district.
