= Sarab Rud, Semnan =

Village in Semnan province, Iran

Sarab Rud Persian: سرابرود
- Village
- Location within Iran
- Coordinates: 35°16′52″N 52°25′12″E
- Country: Iran
- Province: Semnan
- County: Aradan
- District: Central
- Rural District: Yateri

Population (2016)
  - Total: 37
- Time zone: UTC+3:30 (IRST)

Sarab Rud (Persian: سرابرود) (Note: Also romanized as Sarāb Rūd) is a village in Yateri Rural District of the Central District in Aradan County, Semnan province, Iran.

== Demographics ==
=== Population ===
The village did not appear in the 2006 National Census, when it was in Kohanabad Rural District of the former Aradan District in Garmsar County. The following census in 2011 counted a population of 48 in 20 households. The 2016 census measured the population of the village as 37 people in 18 households, by which time the district had been separated from the county in the establishment of Aradan County. The rural district was transferred to the new Central District and later in the same year was separated from the district in the formation of Kohanabad District. Sarab Rud was transferred to Yateri Rural District of the Central District.
