= Chahar Taq-e Bala =

Village in Semnan province, Iran

Chahar Taq-e Bala Persian: چهارطاق بالا
- Village
- Location within Iran
- Coordinates: 35°23′44″N 52°40′39″E
- Country: Iran
- Province: Semnan
- County: Aradan
- District: Kohanabad
- Rural District: Faravan

Population (2016)
  - Total: 43
- Time zone: UTC+3:30 (IRST)

Chahar Taq-e Bala (Persian: چهارطاق بالا) (Note: Also romanized as Chahār Ţāq-e Bālā) is a village in Faravan Rural District of Kohanabad District in Aradan County, Semnan province, Iran.

== Demographics ==
=== Population ===
At the time of the 2006 National Census, the village's population was 110 in 36 households, when it was in Kohanabad Rural District of the former Aradan District in Garmsar County. The following census in 2011 counted 78 people in 23 households. The 2016 census measured the population of the village as 43 people in 17 households, by which time the district had been separated from the county in the establishment of Aradan County. The rural district was transferred to the new Central District, and later in the same year was separated from the district in the formation of Kohanabad District. Chahar Taq-e Bala was transferred to Faravan Rural District created in the new district.
