= Faravan =

Village in Semnan province, Iran

Faravan Persian: فروان
- Village
- Location within Iran
- Coordinates: 35°13′01″N 52°32′53″E
- Country: Iran
- Province: Semnan
- County: Aradan
- District: Kohanabad
- Rural District: Faravan

Population (2016)
  - Total: 603
- Time zone: UTC+3:30 (IRST)

Faravan (Persian: فروان) (Note: Also romanized as Faravān, Farvān, Farwān, and Forvān) is a village in, and the capital of, Faravan Rural District in Kohanabad District of Aradan County, Semnan province, Iran.

== Demographics ==
=== Population ===
At the time of the 2006 National Census, the village's population was 894 in 261 households, when it was in Kohanabad Rural District of the former Aradan District in Garmsar County. The following census in 2011 counted 766 people in 243 households. The 2016 census measured the population of the village as 603 people in 227 households, by which time the district had been separated from the county in the establishment of Aradan County. The rural district was transferred to the new Central District, and later in the same year was separated from the district in the formation of Kohanabad District. The village was transferred to Faravan Rural District created in the new district. Faravan was the most populous village in its rural district.
