= Panj Hezari =

Village in Semnan province, Iran

Panj Hezari Persian: پنجهزاري
- Village
- Country: Iran
- Province: Semnan
- County: Aradan
- District: Kohanabad
- Rural District: Faravan

Population (2016)
  - Total: Below reporting threshold
- Time zone: UTC+3:30 (IRST)

Panj Hezari (Persian: پنجهزاري) (Note: Also romanized as Panj Hezārī) is a village in Faravan Rural District of Kohanabad District in Aradan County, Semnan province, Iran.

== Demographics ==
=== Population ===
At the time of the 2006 National Census, the village's population was 23 in seven households, when it was in Kohanabad Rural District of the former Aradan District in Garmsar County. The village did not appear in the following census of 2011. The 2016 census measured the population of the village as below the reporting threshold, by which time the district had been separated from the county in the establishment of Aradan County. The rural district was transferred to the new Central District, and later in the same year was separated from the district in the formation of Kohanabad District. Panj Hezari was transferred to Faravan Rural District created in the new district.
