= Qaleh-ye Akbarabad =

Village in Semnan province, Iran

Qaleh-ye Akbarabad Persian: قلعه اکبر آباد
- Village
- Location within Iran
- Coordinates: 35°16′24″N 52°26′43″E
- Country: Iran
- Province: Semnan
- County: Aradan
- District: Central
- Rural District: Yateri

Population (2016)
  - Total: 0
- Time zone: UTC+3:30 (IRST)

Qaleh-ye Akbarabad (Persian: قلعه اکبر آباد) (Note: Also romanized as Qal‘eh-ye Akbarābād) is a village in Yateri Rural District of the Central District in Aradan County, Semnan province, Iran.

== Demographics ==
=== Population ===
At the time of the 2006 National Census, the village's population was 13 in four households, when it was in Kohanabad Rural District of the former Aradan District in Garmsar County. The following census in 2011 counted a population below the reporting threshold. The 2016 census measured the population of the village as zero, by which time the district had been separated from the county in the establishment of Aradan County. The rural district was transferred to the new Central District and later in the same year was separated from the district in the formation of Kohanabad District. Qaleh-ye Akbarabad was transferred to Yateri Rural District of the Central District.
