= Jalilabad, Semnan =

Village in Semnan province, Iran

Jalilabad Persian: جليل آباد
- Village
- Location within Iran
- Coordinates: 35°16′07″N 52°29′06″E
- Country: Iran
- Province: Semnan
- County: Aradan
- District: Central
- Rural District: Yateri

Population (2006)
  - Total: 701
- Time zone: UTC+3:30 (IRST)

Jalilabad (Persian: جليل آباد) (Note: Also romanized as Jalīlābād) is a village in Yateri Rural District of the Central District in Aradan County, Semnan province, Iran.

== Demographics ==
=== Population ===
At the time of the 2006 National Census, the village's population was 701 in 202 households, when it was in Kohanabad Rural District of the former Aradan District in Garmsar County. The village did not appear in the following census of 2011. The village once again did not appear in the 2016 census, by which time the district had been separated from the county in the establishment of Aradan County. The rural district was transferred to the new Central District, and later in the same year was separated from the district in the formation of Kohanabad District. Jalilabad was transferred to Yateri Rural District of the Central District.
