= Dowlatabad, Aradan =

Village in Semnan province, Iran

Dowlatabad Persian: دولت آباد
- Village
- Location within Iran
- Coordinates: 35°11′10″N 52°29′58″E
- Country: Iran
- Province: Semnan
- County: Aradan
- District: Central
- Rural District: Hoseynabad-e Kordehha

Population (2016)
  - Total: 194
- Time zone: UTC+3:30 (IRST)

Dowlatabad (Persian: دولت آباد) (Note: Also romanized as Daulatābād and Dowlatābād) is a village in Hoseynabad-e Kordehha Rural District of the Central District in Aradan County, Semnan province, Iran.

== Demographics ==
=== Population ===
At the time of the 2006 National Census, the village's population was 238 in 74 households, when it was in Yateri Rural District of the former Aradan District in Garmsar County. The following census in 2011 counted 230 people in 73 households. The 2016 census measured the population of the village as 194 people in 79 households, by which time the district had been separated from the county in the establishment of Aradan County. The rural district was transferred to the new Central District, and the village was transferred to Hoseynabad-e Kordehha Rural District created in the same district.
