= Rameh-ye Bala =

Village in Semnan province, Iran

Rameh-ye Bala Persian: رامه بالا
- Village
- Location within Iran
- Coordinates: 35°28′36″N 52°43′30″E
- Country: Iran
- Province: Semnan
- County: Aradan
- District: Kohanabad
- Rural District: Faravan

Population (2016)
  - Total: 54
- Time zone: UTC+3:30 (IRST)

Rameh-ye Bala (Persian: رامه بالا) (Note: Also romanized as Rāmeh Bālā and Rāmeh-ye Bālā) is a village in Faravan Rural District of Kohanabad District in Aradan County, Semnan province, Iran.

== Demographics ==
=== Population ===
At the time of the 2006 National Census, the village's population was 36 in nine households, when it was in Kohanabad Rural District of the former Aradan District in Garmsar County. The following census in 2011 counted 139 people in 48 households. The 2016 census measured the population of the village as 54 people in 18 households, by which time the district had been separated from the county in the establishment of Aradan County. The rural district was transferred to the new Central District, and later in the same year was separated from the district in the formation of Kohanabad District. Rameh-ye Bala was transferred to Faravan Rural District created in the new district.
