= Emamzadeh Abdollah, Aradan =

Village in Semnan province, Iran

Emamzadeh Abdollah Persian: امامزاده عبداله
- Village
- Location within Iran
- Coordinates: 35°12′17″N 52°30′53″E
- Country: Iran
- Province: Semnan
- County: Aradan
- District: Central
- Rural District: Hoseynabad-e Kordehha

Population (2016)
  - Total: 114
- Time zone: UTC+3:30 (IRST)

Emamzadeh Abdollah (Persian: امامزاده عبداله) (Note: Also romanized as Emāmzādeh ‘Abdollāh) is a village in Hoseynabad-e Kordehha Rural District of the Central District in Aradan County, Semnan province, Iran.

== Demographics ==
=== Population ===
At the time of the 2006 National Census, the village's population was 193 in 52 households, when it was in Yateri Rural District of the former Aradan District in Garmsar County. The following census in 2011 counted 186 people in 60 households. The 2016 census measured the population of the village as 114 people in 46 households, by which time the district had been separated from the county in the establishment of Aradan County. The rural district was transferred to the new Central District, and the village was transferred to Hoseynabad-e Kordehha Rural District created in the same district.
