= Emamzadeh Zualfaqar =

Village in Semnan province, Iran

Emamzadeh Zualfaqar Persian: امامزاده ذوالفقار
- Village
- Location within Iran
- Coordinates: 35°11′42″N 52°32′52″E
- Country: Iran
- Province: Semnan
- County: Aradan
- District: Central
- Rural District: Hoseynabad-e Kordehha

Population (2016)
  - Total: 57
- Time zone: UTC+3:30 (IRST)

Emamzadeh Zualfaqar (Persian: امامزاده ذوالفقار) (Note: Also romanized as Emāmzādeh Ẕūālfaqār; also known as Emāmzādeh Ẕolfaqār) is a village in Hoseynabad-e Kordehha Rural District of the Central District in Aradan County, Semnan province, Iran.

== Demographics ==
=== Population ===
At the time of the 2006 National Census, the village's population was 13 in five households, when it was in Yateri Rural District of the former Aradan District in Garmsar County. The following census in 2011 counted 94 people in 30 households. The 2016 census measured the population of the village as 57 people in 21 households, by which time the district had been separated from the county in the establishment of Aradan County. The rural district was transferred to the new Central District, and the village was transferred to Hoseynabad-e Kordehha Rural District created in the same district.
