= Deh Namak, Semnan =

Village in Semnan province, Iran

Deh Namak Persian: ده نمك
- Village
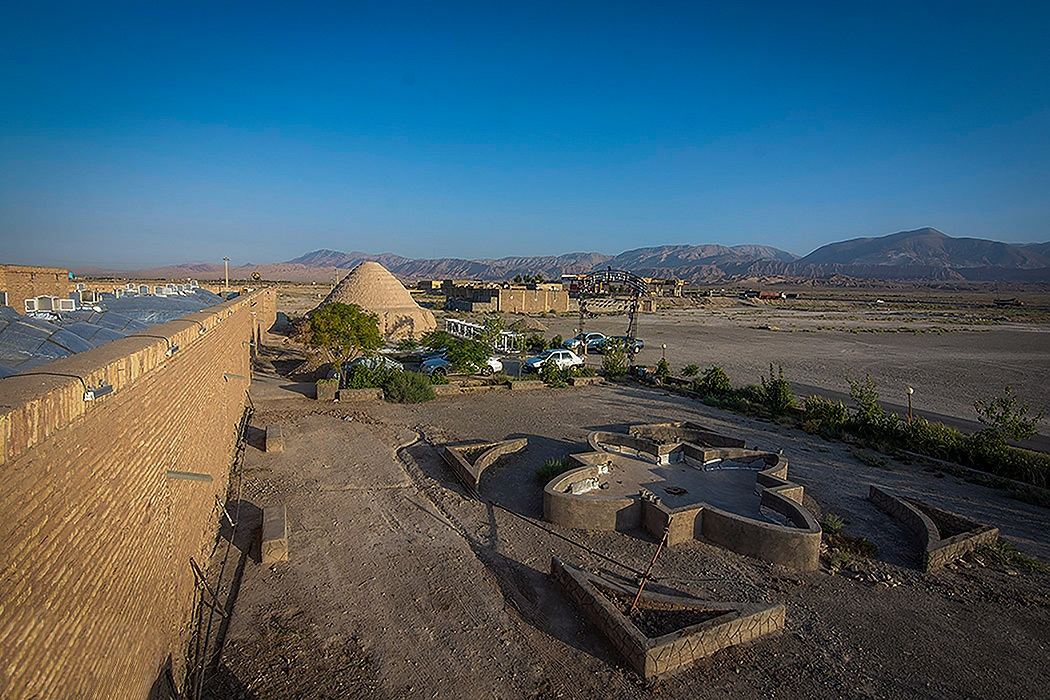
- Caravanserai in the village of Deh Namak

- Location within Iran
- Coordinates: 35°15′14″N 52°44′00″E
- Country: Iran
- Province: Semnan
- County: Aradan
- District: Kohanabad
- Rural District: Faravan

Population (2016)
  - Total: 119
- Time zone: UTC+3:30 (IRST)

Deh Namak (Persian: ده نمك) is a village in Faravan Rural District of Kohanabad District in Aradan County, Semnan province, Iran.

== Demographics ==
=== Population ===
At the time of the 2006 National Census, the village's population was 32 in 16 households, when it was in Kohanabad Rural District of the former Aradan District in Garmsar County. The following census in 2011 counted 110 people in 43 households. The 2016 census measured the population of the village as 119 people in 49 households, by which time the district had been separated from the county in the establishment of Aradan County. The rural district was transferred to the new Central District, and later in the same year was separated from the district in the formation of Kohanabad District. Deh Namak was transferred to Faravan Rural District created in the new district.
