= Qaleh Kharabeh, Semnan =

Village in Semnan province, Iran

Qaleh Kharabeh Persian: قلعه خرابه
- Village
- Location within Iran
- Coordinates: 35°15′13″N 52°31′11″E
- Country: Iran
- Province: Semnan
- County: Aradan
- District: Kohanabad
- Rural District: Kohanabad

Population (2016)
  - Total: 66
- Time zone: UTC+3:30 (IRST)

Qaleh Kharabeh (Persian: قلعه خرابه) (Note: Also romanized as Qal‘eh Kharābeh; also known as Eslāmābād (اسلام آباد), Kharābeh Shahr, and Qal‘eh) is a village in Kohanabad Rural District of Kohanabad District in Aradan County, Semnan province, Iran.

== Demographics ==
=== Population ===
At the time of the 2006 National Census, the village's population was 65 in 21 households, when it was in the former Aradan District of Garmsar County. The following census in 2011 counted 46 people in 16 households. The 2016 census measured the population of the village as 66 people in 26 households, by which time the district had been separated from the county in the establishment of Aradan County. The rural district was transferred to the new Central District, and later that year, it was separated from the district in the formation of Kohanabad District.
