= Rostamabad, Semnan =

Village in Semnan province, Iran

Rostamabad Persian: رستم آباد
- Village
- Location within Iran
- Coordinates: 35°12′13″N 52°29′31″E
- Country: Iran
- Province: Semnan
- County: Aradan
- District: Central
- Rural District: Hoseynabad-e Kordehha

Population (2016)
  - Total: 424
- Time zone: UTC+3:30 (IRST)

Rostamabad (Persian: رستم آباد) (Note: Also romanized as Rostamābād; also known as Rustamābād) is a village in Hoseynabad-e Kordehha Rural District of the Central District in Aradan County, Semnan province, Iran.

== Demographics ==
=== Population ===
At the time of the 2006 National Census, the village's population was 307 in 95 households, when it was in Yateri Rural District of the former Aradan District in Garmsar County. The following census in 2011 counted 534 people in 167 households. The 2016 census measured the population of the village as 424 people in 133 households, by which time the district had been separated from the county in the establishment of Aradan County. The rural district was transferred to the new Central District, and the village was transferred to Hoseynabad-e Kordehha Rural District created in the same district.
