= Adelabad, Semnan =

Village in Semnan province, Iran

Adelabad Persian: عدل آباد
- Village
- Location within Iran
- Coordinates: 35.207095°N 52.502134°E
- Country: Iran
- Province: Semnan
- County: Aradan
- District: Central
- Rural District: Hoseynabad-e Kordehha

Population (2016)
  - Total: 6
- Time zone: UTC+3:30 (IRST)

Adelabad (Persian: عدل آباد) (Note: Also romanized as ‘Ādelābād) is a village in Hoseynabad-e Kordehha Rural District of the Central District in Aradan County, Semnan province, Iran.

== Demographics ==
=== Population ===
At the time of the 2006 and 2011 National Censuses, the village's population was below the reporting threshold, when it was in Yateri Rural District of the former Aradan District in Garmsar County. The 2016 census measured the population of the village as six people in four households, by which time the district had been separated from the county in the establishment of Aradan County. The rural district was transferred to the new Central District, and the village was transferred to Hoseynabad-e Kordehha Rural District created in the same district.
