= Kand-e Qoli Khan =

Village in Semnan province, Iran

Kand-e Qoli Khan Persian: كند قلي خان
- Village
- Location within Iran
- Coordinates: 35°13′25″N 52°29′48″E
- Country: Iran
- Province: Semnan
- County: Aradan
- District: Kohanabad
- Rural District: Kohanabad

Population (2016)
  - Total: 432
- Time zone: UTC+3:30 (IRST)

Kand-e Qoli Khan (Persian: كند قلي خان) (Note: Also romanized as Kand-e Qolī Khān) is a village in Kohanabad Rural District of Kohanabad District in Aradan County, Semnan province, Iran.

== Demographics ==
=== Population ===
At the time of the 2006 National Census, the village's population was 775 in 225 households, when it was in the former Aradan District of Garmsar County. The following census in 2011 counted 586 people in 189 households. The 2016 census measured the population of the village as 432 people in 169 households, by which time the district had been separated from the county in the establishment of Aradan County. The rural district was transferred to the new Central District, and later that year, it was separated from the district in the formation of Kohanabad District. Kand-e Qoli Khan was the most populous village in its rural district.
