= Faravan Rural District =

Rural district in Semnan province, Iran

Faravan Rural District Persian: دهستان فروان
- Rural District
- Location within Iran
- Coordinates: 34°56′N 52°45′E
- Country: Iran
- Province: Semnan
- County: Aradan
- District: Kohanabad
- Established: 2011
- Capital: Faravan

Population (2016)
  - Total: 1,134
- Time zone: UTC+3:30 (IRST)

Faravan Rural District (Persian: دهستان فروان) is in Kohanabad District of Aradan County, Semnan province, Iran. Its capital is the village of Faravan.

== History ==
In 2011, Aradan District was separated from Garmsar County in the establishment of Aradan County, which was divided into one district of two rural districts, with Aradan as its capital and only city at the time. Later in the same year, Kohanabad Rural District was separated from the Central District in the formation of Kohanabad District, and Faravan Rural District was created in the same district.

== Demographics ==
=== Population ===
At the time of the 2016 National Census, the rural district's population was 1,134 in 436 households. The most populous of its 72 villages was Faravan, with 603 people.

=== Other villages in the rural district ===
- Chahar Taq-e Bala
- Deh Namak
- Pa Deh
- Panj Hezari
- Qalibaf
- Rameh-ye Bala
- Rameh-ye Pain
