= Amirabad-e Olya (disambiguation) =

Amirabad-e Olya or Amir Abad Olya (Persian: اميرابادعليا) may refer to:

- Amir Abad Olya, Hamadan
- Amirabad-e Olya, Kerman
- Amirabad-e Olya, Kohgiluyeh and Boyer-Ahmad
