= Aluak =

Village in Semnan province, Iran

Aluak Persian: الوئك
- Village
- Location within Iran
- Coordinates: 35°12′50″N 52°28′05″E
- Country: Iran
- Province: Semnan
- County: Aradan
- District: Central
- Rural District: Yateri

Population (2016)
  - Total: Below reporting threshold
- Time zone: UTC+3:30 (IRST)

Aluak (Persian: الوئك) (Note: Also romanized as Ālū’ak) is a village in Yateri Rural District of the Central District in Aradan County, Semnan province, Iran.

== Demographics ==
=== Population ===
At the time of the 2006 National Census, the village's population was six in four households, when it was in the former Aradan District of Garmsar County. The village did not appear in the following census of 2011. The 2016 census measured the population of the village as below the reporting threshold, by which time the district had been separated from the county in the establishment of Aradan County. The rural district was transferred to the new Central District.
