= Yateri =

Yateri or Yatri (Persian: ياتري) may refer to:

- Yateri-ye Bala
- Yateri-ye Pain
- Yateri Rural District
