= Taqiabad, Aradan =

Village in Semnan province, Iran

Taqiabad Persian: تقي آباد
- Village
- Country: Iran
- Province: Semnan
- County: Aradan
- District: Central
- Rural District: Yateri

Population (2006)
  - Total: 35
- Time zone: UTC+3:30 (IRST)

Taqiabad (Persian: تقی‌آباد) (Note: Also romanized as Taqīābād) is a village in Yateri Rural District of the Central District in Aradan County, Semnan province, Iran.

== Demographics ==
=== Population ===
At the time of the 2006 National Census, the village's population was 35 in nine households, when it was in the former Aradan District of Garmsar County. The village did not appear in the following censuses of 2011 and 2016, by which time the district had been separated from the county in the establishment of Aradan County. The rural district was transferred to the new Central District.
