= Hoseynabad-e Kordehha =

Village in Semnan province, Iran

Hoseynabad-e Kordehha Persian: حسين آباد کردها
- Village
- Location within Iran
- Coordinates: 35°12′12″N 52°29′59″E
- Country: Iran
- Province: Semnan
- County: Aradan
- District: Central
- Rural District: Hoseynabad-e Kordehha

Population (2016)
  - Total: 1,041
- Time zone: UTC+3:30 (IRST)

Hoseynabad-e Kordehha (Persian: حسين آباد کردها) (Note: Also romanized as Ḩoseynābād-e Kordehhā; also known as Ḩoseynābād-e Kordeh (حسين آباد کرده) and Ḩoseynābād-e Kordha) is a village in, and the capital of, Hoseynabad-e Kordehha Rural District in the Central District of Aradan County, Semnan province, Iran.

== Demographics ==
=== Population ===
At the time of the 2006 National Census, the village's population was 1,303 in 367 households, when it was in Yateri Rural District of the former Aradan District in Garmsar County. The following census in 2011 counted 1,398 people in 418 households. The 2016 census measured the population of the village as 1,041 people in 358 households, by which time the district had been separated from the county in the establishment of Aradan County. The rural district was transferred to the new Central District, and the village was transferred to Hoseynabad-e Kordehha Rural District created in the same district. Hoseynabad-e Kordehha was the most populous village in its rural district.
