= Emamzadeh Ali Akbar, Semnan =

Village in Semnan province, Iran

Emamzadeh Ali Akbar Persian: امامزاده علي اكبر
- Village
- Location within Iran
- Coordinates: 35°12′38″N 52°27′31″E
- Country: Iran
- Province: Semnan
- County: Aradan
- District: Central
- Rural District: Yateri

Population (2016)
  - Total: 55
- Time zone: UTC+3:30 (IRST)

Emamzadeh Ali Akbar (Persian: امامزاده علي اكبر) (Note: Also romanized as Emāmzādeh ‘Alī Akbar) is a village in Yateri Rural District of the Central District in Aradan County, Semnan province, Iran.

== Demographics ==
=== Population ===
At the time of the 2006 National Census, the village's population was 25 in seven households, when it was in the former Aradan District of Garmsar County. The following census in 2011 counted 82 people in 26 households. The 2016 census measured the population of the village as 55 people in 20 households, by which time the district had been separated from the county in the establishment of Aradan County. The rural district was transferred to the new Central District.
