= Davarabad =

Village in Semnan province, Iran

Davarabad Persian: داور آباد
- Village
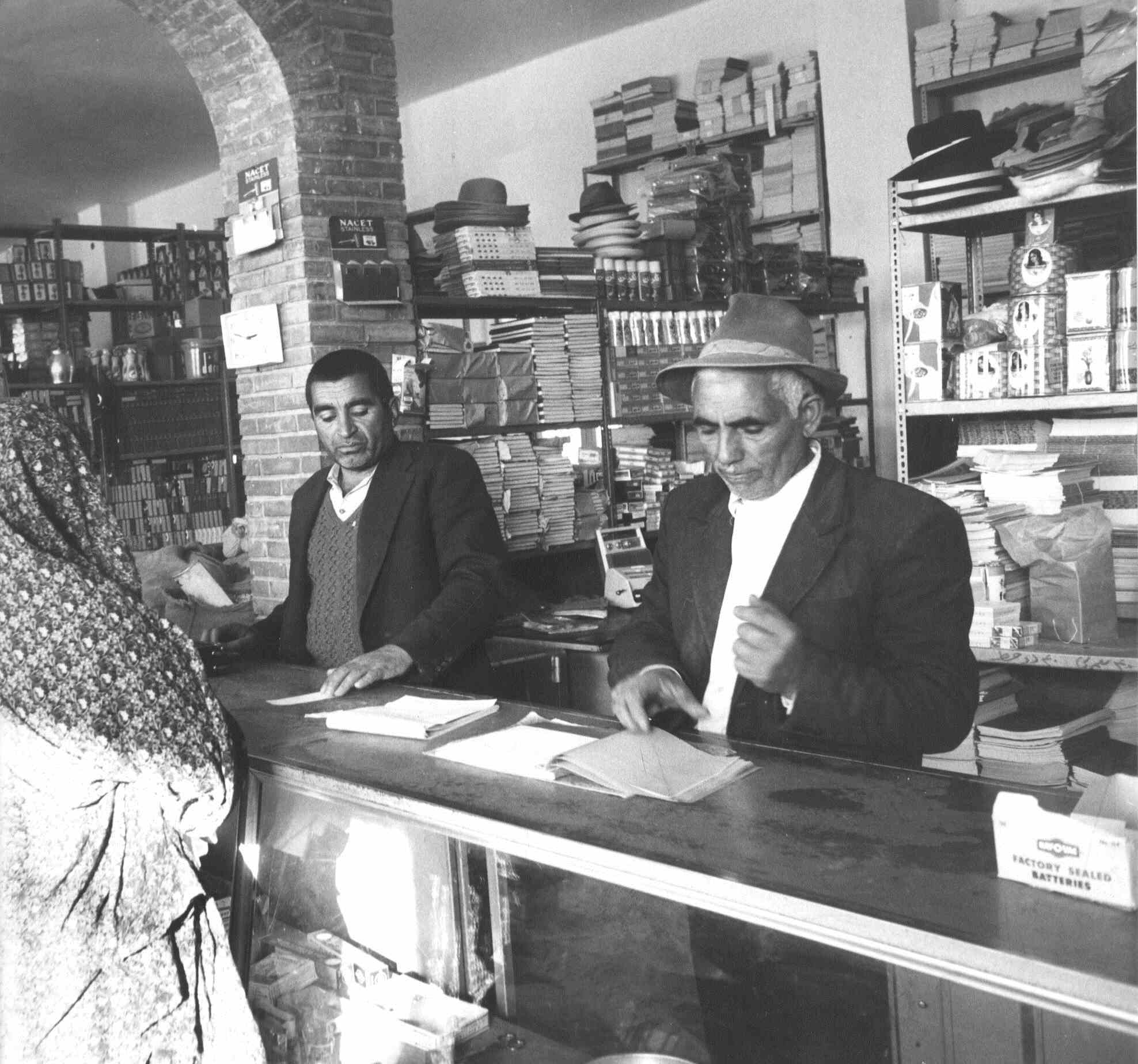
- Stationery store in the village of Davarabad, 4 November 1973

- Location within Iran
- Coordinates: 35°13′13″N 52°28′48″E
- Country: Iran
- Province: Semnan
- County: Aradan
- District: Central
- Rural District: Yateri

Population (2016)
  - Total: 1,074
- Time zone: UTC+3:30 (IRST)

Davarabad (Persian: داور آباد) (Note: Also romanized as Dāvarābād) is a village in, and the capital of, Yateri Rural District in the Central District of Aradan County, Semnan province, Iran.

== Demographics ==
=== Population ===
At the time of the 2006 National Census, the village's population was 1,570 in 454 households, when it was in the former Aradan District of Garmsar County. The following census in 2011 counted 1,534 people in 485 households. The 2016 census measured the population of the village as 1,074 people in 394 households, by which time the district had been separated from the county in the establishment of Aradan County. The rural district was transferred to the new Central District. Davarabad was the most populous village in its rural district.
