= Deh Soltan, Semnan =

Village in Semnan province, Iran

Deh Soltan Persian: ده سلطان
- Village
- Location within Iran
- Coordinates: 35°11′38″N 52°30′44″E
- Country: Iran
- Province: Semnan
- County: Aradan
- District: Central
- Rural District: Hoseynabad-e Kordehha

Population (2016)
  - Total: 434
- Time zone: UTC+3:30 (IRST)

Deh Soltan (Persian: ده سلطان) (Note: Also romanized as Deh Solţān and Deh-e Solţān; also known as Deh-i-Sultān) is a village in Hoseynabad-e Kordehha Rural District of the Central District in Aradan County, Semnan province, Iran.

== Demographics ==
=== Population ===
At the time of the 2006 National Census, the village's population was 333 in 101 households, when it was in Yateri Rural District of the former Aradan District in Garmsar County. The following census in 2011 counted 534 people in 153 households. The 2016 census measured the population of the village as 434 people in 154 households, by which time the district had been separated from the county in the establishment of Aradan County. The rural district was transferred to the new Central District, and the village was transferred to Hoseynabad-e Kordehha Rural District created in the same district.
