= Pirabad (disambiguation) =

Pirabad is a village in Lorestan Province, Iran.

Pirabad (Persian: پيرآباد) may also refer to:

- Pirabad, Narmashir, Kerman Province
- Pirabad, Rigan, Kerman Province
- Pirabad, Khuzestan
