= Hashtabad =

Village in Semnan province, Iran

Hashtabad Persian: هشت آباد
- Village
- Location within Iran
- Coordinates: 35°13′55″N 52°28′25″E
- Country: Iran
- Province: Semnan
- County: Aradan
- District: Central
- Rural District: Yateri

Population (2016)
  - Total: 519
- Time zone: UTC+3:30 (IRST)

Hashtabad (Persian: هشت آباد) (Note: Also romanized as Hashtābād) is a village in Yateri Rural District of the Central District in Aradan County, Semnan province, Iran.

== Demographics ==
=== Population ===
At the time of the 2006 National Census, the village's population was 696 in 210 households, when it was in the former Aradan District of Garmsar County. The following census in 2011 counted 660 people in 209 households. The 2016 census measured the population of the village as 519 people in 192 households, by which time the district had been separated from the county in the establishment of Aradan County. The rural district was transferred to the new Central District.
