= Sudaghlan =

Village in Semnan province, Iran

Sudaghlan Persian: سوداغلان
- Village
- Location within Iran
- Country: Iran
- Province: Semnan
- County: Aradan
- District: Central
- Rural District: Yateri

Population (2016)
  - Total: 37
- Time zone: UTC+3:30 (IRST)

Sudaghlan (Persian: سوداغلان) (Note: Also romanized as Sowdāghlān and Sūdaghlān) is a village in Yateri Rural District of the Central District in Aradan County, Semnan province, Iran.

== Demographics ==
=== Population ===
At the time of the 2006 National Census, the village's population was 42 in 13 households, when it was in the former Aradan District of Garmsar County. The following census in 2011 counted 24 people in eight households. The 2016 census measured the population of the village as 37 people in 18 households, by which time the district had been separated from the county in the establishment of Aradan County. The rural district was transferred to the new Central District.
