= Kohanabad =

City in Semnan province, Iran

Kohanabad Persian: کهن آباد
- City
- Location within Iran
- Coordinates: 35°13′18″N 52°31′21″E
- Country: Iran
- Province: Semnan
- County: Aradan
- District: Kohanabad
- Established as a city: 2011

Population (2016)
  - Total: 1,192
- Time zone: UTC+3:30 (IRST)

Kohanabad (Persian: کهن آباد) (Note: Also romanized as Kahnābād and Kohanābād) is a city in, and the capital of, Kohanabad District in Aradan County, Semnan province, Iran. It also serves as the administrative center for Kohanabad Rural District.

== Demographics ==
=== Population ===
At the time of the 2006 National Census, Kohanabad's population was 1,630 in 457 households, when it was a village in Kohanabad Rural District of the former Aradan District in Garmsar County. The following census in 2011 counted 1,509 people in 473 households. The 2016 census measured the population as 1,192 people in 450 households, by which time the district had been separated from the county in the establishment of Aradan County. The rural district was transferred to the new Central District, and later that year, it was separated from the district in the formation of Kohanabad District. At the same time, the village of Kohanabad was converted to a city.
