= Deh Soltan =

Deh Soltan or Deh-e Soltan or Deh-i-Sultan (Persian: ده سلطان) may refer to:

- Deh Soltan, Semnan
- Deh-e Soltan, Sistan and Baluchestan
