= Yatariabad =

Yatariabad or Yateriabad (Persian: آباد ياتري) may refer to:

- Yatariabad-e Olya
- Yateriabad-e Sofla
