= Hoseynabad-e Kordehha Rural District =

Rural district in Semnan province, Iran

Hoseynabad-e Kordehha Rural District Persian: دهستان حسین‌آباد کردها
- Rural District
- Location within Iran
- Coordinates: 34°48′N 52°38′E
- Country: Iran
- Province: Semnan
- County: Aradan
- District: Central
- Established: 2011
- Capital: Hoseynabad-e Kordehha

Population (2016)
  - Total: 2,275
- Time zone: UTC+3:30 (IRST)

Hoseynabad-e Kordehha Rural District (Persian: دهستان حسین‌آباد کردها) is in the Central District of Aradan County, Semnan province, Iran. Its capital is the village of Hoseynabad-e Kordehha.

== History ==
In 2011, Aradan District was separated from Garmsar County in the establishment of Aradan County, which was divided into one district of two rural districts, with Aradan as its capital and only city at the time. Later in the same year, Hoseynabad-e Kordehha Rural District was created in the Central District.

== Demographics ==
=== Population ===
At the time of the 2016 National Census, the rural district's population was 2,275 in 798 households. The most populous of its 12 villages was Hoseynabad-e Kordehha, with 1,041 people.

=== Other villages in the rural district ===
- Adelabad
- Deh Soltan
- Dowlatabad
- Emamzadeh Abdollah
- Emamzadeh Zualfaqar
- Rostamabad
