= Amirabad, Semnan =

Village in Semnan province, Iran

Amirabad Persian: امير آباد
- Village
- Location within Iran
- Country: Iran
- Province: Semnan
- County: Aradan
- District: Central
- Rural District: Yateri

Population (2016)
  - Total: 11
- Time zone: UTC+3:30 (IRST)

Amirabad (Persian: امير آباد) (Note: Also romanized as Amīrābād) is a village in Yateri Rural District of the Central District in Aradan County, Semnan province, Iran.

== Demographics ==
=== Population ===
At the time of the 2006 National Census, the village's population was 14 in five households, when it was in the former Aradan District of Garmsar County. The following census in 2011 counted 25 people in 11 households. The 2016 census measured the population of the village as 11 people in nine households, by which time the district had been separated from the county in the establishment of Aradan County. The rural district was transferred to the new Central District.
