= Rameh, Iran =

Rameh (Persian: رامه) may refer to:

- Rameh-ye Bala, Semnan Province
- Rameh-ye Pain, Semnan Province
- Rameh, South Khorasan
