= Hoseynabad-e Kordha =

Hoseynabad-e Kordha (Persian: حسين ابادكردها) may refer to:

- Hoseynabad-e Kordha, North Khorasan
- Hoseynabad-e Kordha, Semnan
