= Yateri-ye Bala =

Village in Semnan province, Iran

Yateri-ye Bala Persian: ياتري بالا
- Village
- Location within Iran
- Coordinates: 35°13′49″N 52°27′38″E
- Country: Iran
- Province: Semnan
- County: Aradan
- District: Central
- Rural District: Yateri

Population (2016)
  - Total: 546
- Time zone: UTC+3:30 (IRST)

Yateri-ye Bala (Persian: ياتري بالا) (Note: Also romanized as Yāterī-ye Bālā and Yātrī Bālā; also known as Yātarīābād-e ‘Olyā) is a village in Yateri Rural District of the Central District in Aradan County, Semnan province, Iran.

== Demographics ==
=== Population ===
At the time of the 2006 National Census, the village's population was 708 in 208 households, when it was in the former Aradan District of Garmsar County. The following census in 2011 counted 659 people in 201 households. The 2016 census measured the population of the village as 546 people in 187 households, by which time the district had been separated from the county in the establishment of Aradan County. The rural district was transferred to the new Central District.
