= Pa Deh Castle =

- قلعه پاده
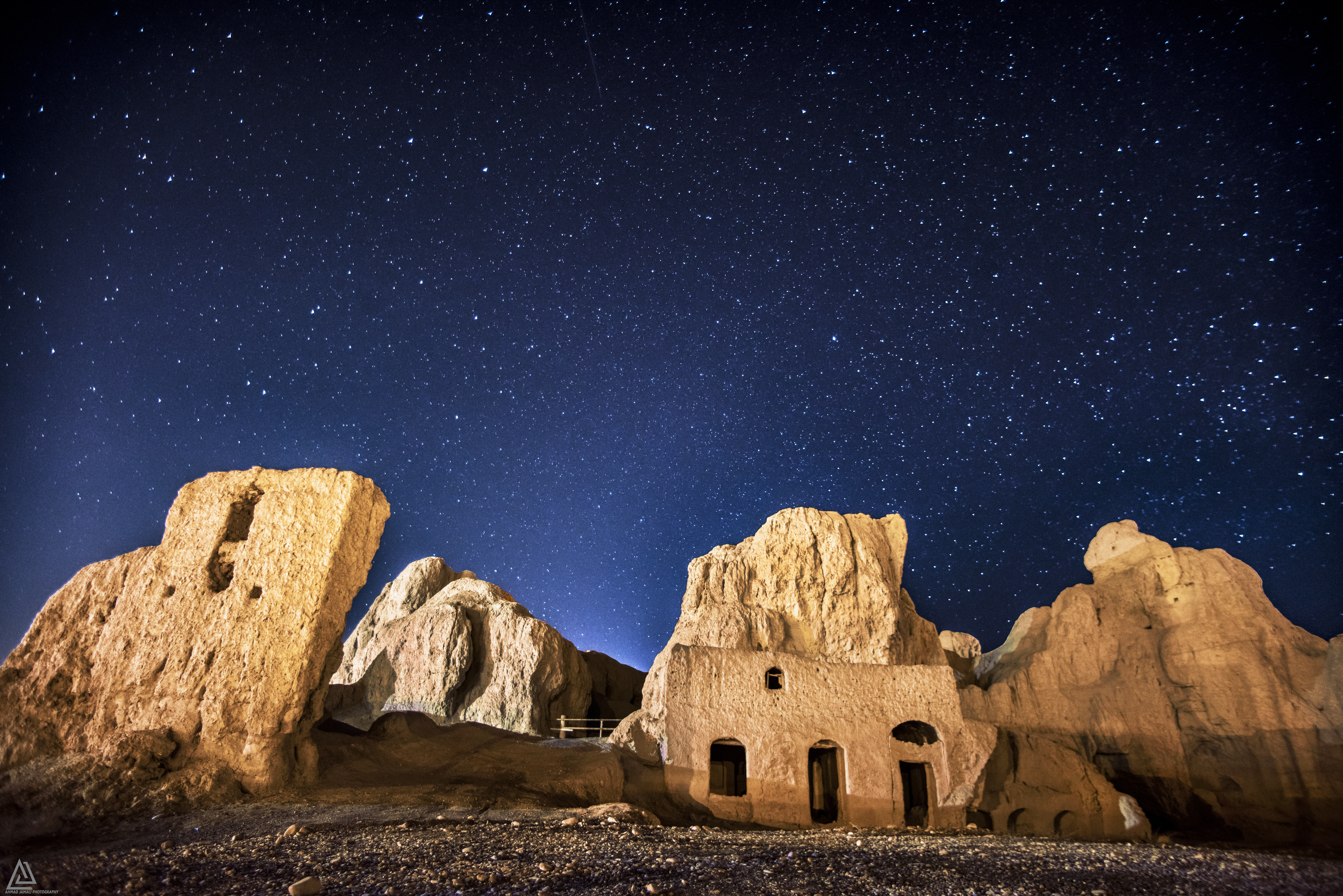
- Interactive map of the Pa Deh Castle area

General information
- Type: Castle
- Location: Pa Deh, Iran
- Coordinates: 35°15′10″N 52°32′13″E

Pa Deh Castle (Persian: قلعه پاده) is a historical castle located in Aradan County in Semnan Province, The longevity of this fortress dates back to the Historical periods after Islam.
