= Yateri-ye Pain =

Village in Semnan province, Iran

Yateri-ye Pain Persian: ياتري پائين
- Village
- Location within Iran
- Coordinates: 35°11′44″N 52°29′10″E
- Country: Iran
- Province: Semnan
- County: Aradan
- District: Central
- Rural District: Yateri

Population (2016)
  - Total: 160
- Time zone: UTC+3:30 (IRST)

Yateri-ye Pain (Persian: ياتري پائين) (Note: Also romanized as Yāterī-ye Pā’īn and Yātrī Pā’īn; also known as Yāterīābād-e Soflá) is a village in Yateri Rural District of the Central District in Aradan County, Semnan province, Iran.

== Demographics ==
=== Population ===
At the time of the 2006 National Census, the village's population was 178 in 47 households, when it was in the former Aradan District of Garmsar County. The following census in 2011 counted 159 people in 44 households. The 2016 census measured the population of the village as 160 people in 65 households, by which time the district had been separated from the county in the establishment of Aradan County. The rural district was transferred to the new Central District.
