= Kalateh-ye Amiri =

Kalateh-ye Amiri may refer to:

- Mirabad, Darmian
- Sangan, South Khorasan
