= Mirabad, Iran =

Mirabad, Iran (Persian: ميراباد) may refer to:

- Mirabad, Tiran and Karvan, a village in Isfahan Province
- Mirabad, Dorud, a village in Lorestan Province
- Mirabad, Khorramabad, a village in Lorestan Province
- Mirabad, Selseleh, a village in Lorestan Province
