= Amirabad, Dorud (southern) =

Amirabad اميرآباد
- Village
- Location within Iran
- Coordinates: 33°22′54″N 48°57′46″E
- Country: Iran
- Province: Lorestan
- County: Dorud
- Bakhsh: Central
- Rural District: Dorud

Population (2006)
  - Total: 29
- Time zone: UTC+3:30 (IRST)
  - Summer (DST): UTC+4:30 (IRDT)

Amirabad (Persian: اميرآباد, also Romanized as Amīrābād; also known as Amīrābād-e Gūrkash) is a village in Dorud Rural District, in the Central District of Dorud County, Lorestan Province, Iran. At the 2006 census, its population was 29, in 5 families.
