= Amirabad-e Kot Gorg =

Amirabad-e Kot Gorg اميرابادكت گرگ
- Village
- Location within Iran
- Coordinates: 28°32′12″N 57°49′51″E
- Country: Iran
- Province: Kerman
- County: Anbarabad
- Bakhsh: Central
- Rural District: Mohammadabad

Population (2006)
  - Total: 375
- Time zone: UTC+3:30 (IRST)
  - Summer (DST): UTC+4:30 (IRDT)

Amirabad-e Kot Gorg (Persian: اميرابادكت گرگ, also Romanized as Amīrābād-e Kot Gorg; also known as Kot-e Gorg Ābī Sanjarī, Kot Gorg, Kotūgorg Ābī Sanjarī, Kūt Gorg, and Kūtgurg) is a village in Mohammadabad Rural District, in the Central District of Anbarabad County, Kerman Province, Iran. At the 2006 census, its population was 375, in 63 families.
