= Mirabad, Rivand =

Mirabad ميراباد
- Village
- Location within Iran
- Coordinates: 36°06′37″N 58°46′47″E
- Country: Iran
- Province: Razavi Khorasan
- County: Nishapur
- Bakhsh: Central
- Rural District: Rivand

Population (2006)
  - Total: 67
- Time zone: UTC+3:30 (IRST)
  - Summer (DST): UTC+4:30 (IRDT)

Mirabad (Persian: ميراباد, also Romanized as Mīrābād; also known as Mīrābād-e Khvājeh Ja‘far) is a village in Rivand Rural District, in the Central District of Nishapur County, Razavi Khorasan Province, Iran. At the 2006 census, its population was 67, in 21 families.
