= Amirabad, Izeh =

Amirabad اميراباد
- Village
- Location within Iran
- Coordinates: 31°50′34″N 49°40′02″E
- Country: Iran
- Province: Khuzestan
- County: Izeh
- Bakhsh: Central
- Rural District: Holayjan

Population (2006)
  - Total: 120
- Time zone: UTC+3:30 (IRST)
  - Summer (DST): UTC+4:30 (IRDT)

Amirabad (Persian: اميراباد, also Romanized as Amīrābād) is a village in Holayjan Rural District, in the Central District of Izeh County, Khuzestan Province, Iran. At the 2006 census, its population was 120, in 22 families.
