= Amirabad-e Amirqoli =

Amirabad-e Amirqoli امیرآباد امیرقلی
- Village
- Country: Iran
- Province: Kerman
- County: Sirjan
- Bakhsh: Central
- Rural District: Balvard

Population (2006)
  - Total: 15
- Time zone: UTC+3:30 (IRST)
  - Summer (DST): UTC+4:30 (IRDT)

Amirabad-e Amirqoli (Persian: امیرآباد امیرقلی, also Romanized as Amīrābād-e Amīrqolī) is a village in Balvard Rural District, in the Central District of Sirjan County, Kerman Province, Iran. At the 2006 census, its population was 15, in 4 families.
