= Amirabad-e Sukhek =

Amirabad-e Sukhek اميرابادسوخك
- Village
- Location within Iran
- Coordinates: 29°34′32″N 55°55′12″E
- Country: Iran
- Province: Kerman
- County: Sirjan
- Bakhsh: Pariz
- Rural District: Saadatabad

Population (2006)
  - Total: 218
- Time zone: UTC+3:30 (IRST)
  - Summer (DST): UTC+4:30 (IRDT)

Amirabad-e Sukhek (Persian: اميرابادسوخك, also Romanized as Amīrābād-e Sūkhek; also known as Amīrābād) is a village in Saadatabad Rural District, Pariz District, Sirjan County, Kerman Province, Iran. At the 2006 census, its population was 218, in 52 families.
