= Amirabad-e Vosta Key Mohammad Khan =

Amirabad-e Vosta Key Mohammad Khan اميرابادوسطي كي محمدخان
- Village
- Location within Iran
- Coordinates: 30°36′33″N 51°27′18″E
- Country: Iran
- Province: Kohgiluyeh and Boyer-Ahmad
- County: Boyer-Ahmad
- Bakhsh: Central
- Rural District: Dasht-e Rum

Population (2006)
  - Total: 278
- Time zone: UTC+3:30 (IRST)
  - Summer (DST): UTC+4:30 (IRDT)

Amirabad-e Vosta Key Mohammad Khan (Persian: اميرابادوسطي كي محمدخان, also Romanized as Amīrābād-e Vosţā Key Moḩammad Khān; also known as Amīrābād-e Mīānī, Amīrābād-e Vosţā, Amīrābād-e Vosţá, and Amīrābād Vostā) is a village in Dasht-e Rum Rural District, in the Central District of Boyer-Ahmad County, Kohgiluyeh and Boyer-Ahmad Province, Iran. At the 2006 census, its population was 278, in 55 families.
