= Kalateh-ye Seyyeda =

Kalateh-ye Seyyeda كلاته سيدا
- Village
- Location within Iran
- Coordinates: 36°10′44″N 59°58′10″E
- Country: Iran
- Province: Razavi Khorasan
- County: Mashhad
- Bakhsh: Razaviyeh
- Rural District: Abravan

Population (2006)
  - Total: 361
- Time zone: UTC+3:30 (IRST)
  - Summer (DST): UTC+4:30 (IRDT)

Kalateh-ye Seyyeda (Persian: كلاته سيدا, also Romanized as Kalāteh-ye Seyyedā; also known as Kalāteh-ye Seyyed and Amīrābād) is a village in Abravan Rural District, Razaviyeh District, Mashhad County, Razavi Khorasan Province, Iran. At the 2006 census, its population was 361, in 81 families.
