= Amirabad, Gilan =

Amirabad اميرآباد
- Village
- Location within Iran
- Coordinates: 37°22′13″N 50°11′57″E
- Country: Iran
- Province: Gilan
- County: Lahijan
- Bakhsh: Rudboneh
- Rural District: Shirju Posht

Population (2016)
  - Total: 280
- Time zone: UTC+3:30 (IRST)

Amirabad (Persian: اميرآباد, also Romanized as Amīrābād) is a village in Shirju Posht Rural District, Rudboneh District, Lahijan County, Gilan Province, Iran. The 2016 census measured the population of the village as 280 people in 97 households. Down from 391 people and 116 families at the 2006 census.
