= Amir Kola, Savadkuh =

Amir Kola اميركلا
- Village
- Location within Iran
- Coordinates: 36°13′42″N 52°59′27″E
- Country: Iran
- Province: Mazandaran
- County: Savadkuh
- Bakhsh: Central
- Rural District: Kaseliyan

Population (2006)
  - Total: 108
- Time zone: UTC+3:30 (IRST)

Amir Kola (Persian: اميركلا, also Romanized as Amīr Kolā and Amīr Kalā; also known as Amīrābād and Amīr Kolā Kūlā) is a village in Kaseliyan Rural District, in the Central District of Savadkuh County, Mazandaran Province, Iran. At the 2006 census, its population was 108, in 23 families.

Assassinated Iranian Cleric Abbas-Ali Soleimani is from here.
