= Mirabad-e Abadi =

Mirabad-e Abadi ميرابادعبدي
- Village
- Location within Iran
- Coordinates: 28°19′00″N 57°52′00″E
- Country: Iran
- Province: Kerman
- County: Anbarabad
- Bakhsh: Central
- Rural District: Jahadabad

Population (2006)
  - Total: 26
- Time zone: UTC+3:30 (IRST)
  - Summer (DST): UTC+4:30 (IRDT)

Mirabad-e Abadi (Persian: ميرابادعبدي, also Romanized as Mīrābād-e ʿAbadī; also known as Mīrābād) is a village in Jahadabad Rural District, in the Central District of Anbarabad County, Kerman Province, Iran. At the 2006 census, its population was 26, in 7 families.
