= Amirabad, Nishapur =

Amirabad اميراباد
- Village
- Location within Iran
- Coordinates: 36°11′47″N 58°36′28″E
- Country: Iran
- Province: Razavi Khorasan
- County: Nishapur
- Bakhsh: Central
- Rural District: Takht-e Jolgeh

Population (2006)
  - Total: 172
- Time zone: UTC+3:30 (IRST)
  - Summer (DST): UTC+4:30 (IRDT)

Amirabad (Persian: اميراباد, also Romanized as Amīrābād) is a village in Darbqazi Rural District, in the Central District of Nishapur County, Razavi Khorasan Province, Iran. At the 2006 census, its population was 172, in 41 families.

== See also ==
- List of cities, towns and villages in Razavi Khorasan Province
