= Mirabad, Margavar =

Mirabad ميراباد
- Village
- Location within Iran
- Coordinates: 37°15′43″N 44°55′26″E
- Country: Iran
- Province: West Azerbaijan
- County: Urmia
- Bakhsh: Silvaneh
- Rural District: Margavar

Population (2006)
  - Total: 635
- Time zone: UTC+3:30 (IRST)
  - Summer (DST): UTC+4:30 (IRDT)

Mirabad (Persian: ميراباد, also Romanized as Mīrābād) is a village in Margavar Rural District, Silvaneh District, Urmia County, West Azerbaijan Province, Iran.

== Population ==
At the 2006 census, its population was 635, in 98 families.

== Ancient Sites ==
Although Mirabad's archeological sites do not have international attention, they exist. At the multiple sites, (in 2016 there were 3) archeologists have found sufficient evidence that could rewrite the history books. They believe that at one point the capital of a vast, undocumented empire was once seated in the area. These findings, while interesting, have been ignored and denied by historians even though the evidence doesn't lie. Archeologists want to demolish the city to dig so they can find the massive city that is buried underneath.
