= Amirabad, Rabor =

Amirabad اميراباد
- Village
- Country: Iran
- Province: Kerman
- County: Rabor
- Bakhsh: Hanza
- Rural District: Javaran

Population (2006)
  - Total: 13
- Time zone: UTC+3:30 (IRST)
  - Summer (DST): UTC+4:30 (IRDT)

Amirabad (Persian: اميراباد, also Romanized as Amīrābād) is a village in Javaran Rural District, Hanza District, Rabor County, Kerman Province, Iran. At the 2006 census, its population was 13, in 4 families.
