= Amirabad, Chenaran =

Amirabad اميراباد
- Village
- Location within Iran
- Coordinates: 36°41′51″N 59°02′50″E
- Country: Iran
- Province: Razavi Khorasan
- County: Chenaran
- Bakhsh: Central
- Rural District: Chenaran

Population (2006)
  - Total: 278
- Time zone: UTC+3:30 (IRST)
  - Summer (DST): UTC+4:30 (IRDT)

Amirabad (Persian: اميراباد, also Romanized as Amīrābād) is a village in Chenaran Rural District, in the Central District of Chenaran County, Razavi Khorasan Province, Iran. At the 2006 census, its population was 278, in 68 families.

== See also ==
- List of cities, towns and villages in Razavi Khorasan Province
