= Mirabad-e Sofla =

Mirabad-e Sofla مير آباد سفلي
- Village
- Location within Iran
- Coordinates: 36°01′57″N 45°49′07″E
- Country: Iran
- Province: Kurdistan
- County: Baneh
- Bakhsh: Central
- Rural District: Shuy

Population (2006)
  - Total: 283
- Time zone: UTC+3:30 (IRST)
  - Summer (DST): UTC+4:30 (IRDT)

Mirabad-e Sofla (Persian: مير آباد سفلي, also romanized as Mīrābād-e Soflá) is a village in Shuy Rural District, in the Central District of Baneh County, Kurdistan Province, Iran. At the 2006 census, its population was 283, comprising 54 families.

The village is populated by Kurds.
