= Amirabad, Kuhrang =

Amirabad اميراباد
- Village
- Location within Iran
- Coordinates: 32°21′31″N 50°31′19″E
- Country: Iran
- Province: Chaharmahal and Bakhtiari
- County: Kuhrang
- Bakhsh: Central
- Rural District: Dasht-e Zarrin

Population (2006)
  - Total: 261
- Time zone: UTC+3:30 (IRST)
  - Summer (DST): UTC+4:30 (IRDT)

Amirabad (Persian: اميراباد, also Romanized as Amīrābād; also known as Amīrābād-e Bīdekān) is a village in Dasht-e Zarrin Rural District, in the Central District of Kuhrang County, Chaharmahal and Bakhtiari Province, Iran. At the 2006 census, its population was 261, in 48 families. The village is populated by Lurs.
