= Amirabad-e Eqbal =

Amirabad-e Eqbal اميراباداقبال
- Village
- Location within Iran
- Coordinates: 36°20′47″N 50°00′51″E
- Country: Iran
- Province: Qazvin
- County: Qazvin
- Bakhsh: Central
- Rural District: Eqbal-e Gharbi

Population (2006)
  - Total: 109
- Time zone: UTC+3:30 (IRST)
  - Summer (DST): UTC+4:30 (IRDT)

Amirabad-e Eqbal (Persian: اميراباداقبال, also Romanized as Amīrābād-e Eqbāl; also known as Amīrābād) is a village in Eqbal-e Gharbi Rural District, in the Central District of Qazvin County, Qazvin Province, Iran. At the 2006 census, its population was 109, in 25 families.
