= Amirabad, Nur =

Amirabad اميراباد
- Village
- Location within Iran
- Coordinates: 36°28′05″N 52°14′11″E
- Country: Iran
- Province: Mazandaran
- County: Nur
- Bakhsh: Chamestan
- Rural District: Mianrud

Population (2006)
  - Total: 360
- Time zone: UTC+3:30 (IRST)
  - Summer (DST): UTC+4:30 (IRDT)

Amirabad (Persian: اميراباد, also Romanized as Amīrābād) is a village in Mianrud Rural District, Chamestan District, Nur County, Mazandaran Province, Iran. At the 2006 census, its population was 360, in 91 families.
