= Amirabad-e Babakan =

Amirabad-e Babakan اميرابادبابكان
- Village
- Location within Iran
- Coordinates: 30°40′38″N 51°14′49″E
- Country: Iran
- Province: Kohgiluyeh and Boyer-Ahmad
- County: Boyer-Ahmad
- Bakhsh: Central
- Rural District: Sepidar

Population (2006)
  - Total: 294
- Time zone: UTC+3:30 (IRST)
  - Summer (DST): UTC+4:30 (IRDT)

Amirabad-e Babakan (Persian: اميرابادبابكان, also Romanized as Amīrābād-e Bābakān) is a village in Sepidar Rural District, in the Central District of Boyer-Ahmad County, Kohgiluyeh and Boyer-Ahmad Province, Iran. At the 2006 census, its population was 294, in 51 families.

== Names and location ==
Amirabad-e Babakan is also recorded under the alternative name Chaleh Siseh (Chāleh Sīseh).

The Getty Thesaurus of Geographic Names classifies Amirabad-e Babakan as an inhabited place in Kohgiluyeh and Boyer-Ahmad province.
