= Amirabad, Khorramabad =

Amirabad اميراباد
- Village
- Location within Iran
- Coordinates: 33°28′21″N 48°39′09″E
- Country: Iran
- Province: Lorestan
- County: Khorramabad
- Bakhsh: Zagheh
- Rural District: Zagheh

Population (2006)
  - Total: 126
- Time zone: UTC+3:30 (IRST)
  - Summer (DST): UTC+4:30 (IRDT)

Amirabad (Persian: اميراباد, also Romanized as Amīrābād) is a village in Zagheh Rural District, Zagheh District, Khorramabad County, Lorestan Province, Iran. At the 2006 census, its population was 126, in 31 families.
