= Amirabad, Kiar =

Amirabad اميراباد
- Village
- Location within Iran
- Coordinates: 32°04′54″N 50°46′09″E
- Country: Iran
- Province: Chaharmahal and Bakhtiari
- County: Kiar
- Bakhsh: Central
- Rural District: Kiar-e Gharbi

Population (2006)
  - Total: 344
- Time zone: UTC+3:30 (IRST)
  - Summer (DST): UTC+4:30 (IRDT)

Amirabad (Persian: اميراباد, also Romanized as Amīrābād; also known as Amir Abad Kiyar and Qahak) is a village in Kiar-e Gharbi Rural District, in the Central District of Kiar County, Chaharmahal and Bakhtiari Province, Iran. At the 2006 census, its population was 344, in 92 families. The village is populated by Lurs.
