= Amirabad-e Nadar =

Amirabad-e Nadar اميرابادندر
- Village
- Location within Iran
- Coordinates: 33°50′20″N 48°16′16″E
- Country: Iran
- Province: Lorestan
- County: Selseleh
- Bakhsh: Central
- Rural District: Qaleh-ye Mozaffari

Population (2006)
  - Total: 161
- Time zone: UTC+3:30 (IRST)
  - Summer (DST): UTC+4:30 (IRDT)

Amirabad-e Nadar (Persian: اميرابادندر, also Romanized as Amīrābād-e Nadar and Amīrābād-e Nader; also known as Amīrābād-e Pāpī and Amīrābād-e Papī) is a village in Qaleh-ye Mozaffari Rural District, in the Central District of Selseleh County, Lorestan Province, Iran. At the 2006 census, its population was 161, in 36 families.
