= Amirabad-e Sisakht =

Amirabad-e Sisakht اميرابادسي سخت
- Village
- Location within Iran
- Coordinates: 30°48′15″N 51°27′10″E
- Country: Iran
- Province: Kohgiluyeh and Boyer-Ahmad
- County: Dana
- Bakhsh: Central
- Rural District: Dana

Population (2006)
  - Total: 271
- Time zone: UTC+3:30 (IRST)
  - Summer (DST): UTC+4:30 (IRDT)

Amirabad-e Sisakht (Persian: اميرابادسي سخت, also Romanized as Amīrābād-e Sīsakht; also known as Amīrābād) is a village in Dana Rural District, in the Central District of Dana County, Kohgiluyeh and Boyer-Ahmad Province, Iran. At the 2006 census, its population was 271, in 61 families.
