= Amirabad Kaftar =

Amirabad Kaftar اميرابادكافتر
- Village
- Location within Iran
- Coordinates: 30°32′08″N 52°44′02″E
- Country: Iran
- Province: Fars
- County: Eqlid
- Bakhsh: Central
- Rural District: Khonjesht

Population (2006)
  - Total: 1,368
- Time zone: UTC+3:30 (IRST)
  - Summer (DST): UTC+4:30 (IRDT)

Amirabad Kaftar (Persian: اميرابادكافتر, also Romanized as Amīrābād Kāftar; also known as Amīrābād) is a village in Khonjesht Rural District, in the Central District of Eqlid County, Fars province, Iran. At the 2006 census, its population was 1,368, in 281 families.
