= Amirabad-e Kolahchi =

Amirabad-e Kolahchi اميرابادكلاهچي
- Village
- Location within Iran
- Coordinates: 35°33′43″N 50°47′19″E
- Country: Iran
- Province: Tehran
- County: Malard
- Bakhsh: Central
- Rural District: Akhtarabad

Population (2006)
  - Total: 23
- Time zone: UTC+3:30 (IRST)
  - Summer (DST): UTC+4:30 (IRDT)

Amirabad-e Kolahchi (Persian: اميرابادكلاهچي, also Romanized as Amīrābād-e Kolāhchī and Amīrābād-e Kolāchī) is a village in Akhtarabad Rural District, in the Central District of Malard County, Tehran Province, Iran. At the 2006 census, its population was 23, in 8 families.
