= Amirabad, Pakistan =

Coordinates: 34°11′23.52″N 73°05′29.60″E

Amirabad is a village of the Union Council of Sherwan in the Abbottabad District of Khyber Pakhtunkhwa, Pakistan. It is located 24 km north west of the city of Abbottabad and 5 km east of Sherwan.

== History ==
Amirabad is named after Amir Khan, the son of Sahan Khan, who was one of the eleven great Tanoli ancestors. When tanolies attacked Hazara and took control of Tanaaval. They occupied the lands of the surrounding area. Amirabad then known as Kumhar came under control of Sahan Khan. Said Khan Tanoli, the elder brother of Sahan Khan, took control of Sherwan. Although both brothers lived their lives in Sherwan, they equally distributed their land among their sons. Some Saidyal Tanoli believe that Said Khan Tanoli in has last days shifted to Bammochi Tarli (lower part of the village Bammochi) and died there (statement of Malik Fairoz khan of Plang (death 2004), which is recorded two year before his death, no historical evidence is found). The Saidyal Tanolies are descendants of Said Khan Tanoli.

Amir Khan inherited Amirabad from his father Sahan Khan, although he was attack by Sikh tribes several time but he defended his village with his sons and his nephews the sons of Said Khan Tanoli living In Bammochi. Amir Khan had three sons.

1. Nahmat Khan Tanoli, known as Nehmtu Baba (Nahmtall Tonolies are descendants of Nehmat Khan).
2. Taj Khan Tanoli, known as Taju Baba (Tajwall Tonolies are his descendants).
3. Peel Khan Tanoli, known as Peelu Baba (Peelall Tonolies are descendants of Peel Khan).

== People ==
The population of Amirabad is over 1000. According to 1998 census, it was 959. The local language is Hindko while Urdu is understood universally. The main tribe of this area is the Tanoli (Pathan). The other tribes are Awan and Jadoon (Pathan). In Kaaien the Gujjars are also residing since 1840.

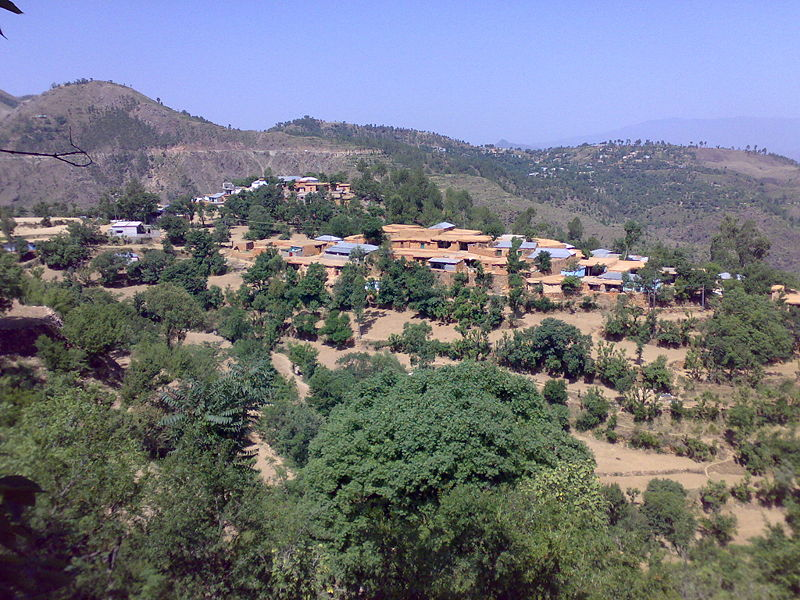
Amirabad

== Location ==
Amirabad, formerly known as Kumharan, is located at the bottom of Koe Bulyana which is around 6000 feet (1828 meters) above sea level. The forest of Bulyana host a number of wild animals. Amirabad is divided into two parts; Amirabad (sheher) and Kaaien. Kaaien is in the east of Amirabad at the altitude of 4840 ft (1475 meters). It is the highest village of Union Council of Sherwan.

Locals grow seasonal crops such as maize (makai), wheat (gandum) and mustard (sarsoan). Amirabad is very rich in fruits such as grapes, orange, apples, plums, figs, apricots and many more.

== Picture gallery ==
- Amirabad Highland
- Amirabad First view
- Amirabad Fields
- Amirabad Sunset
