= Amirabad, Kamyaran =

Amirabad امير آباد
- Village
- Location within Iran
- Coordinates: 35°03′21″N 47°11′26″E
- Country: Iran
- Province: Kurdistan
- County: Kamyaran
- Bakhsh: Muchesh
- Rural District: Amirabad

Population (2006)
  - Total: 398
- Time zone: UTC+3:30 (IRST)
  - Summer (DST): UTC+4:30 (IRDT)

Amirabad (Persian: امير آباد, also Romanized as Amīrābād) is a village in Amirabad Rural District, Muchesh District, Kamyaran County, Kurdistan Province, Iran. At the 2006 census, its population was 398, in 103 families. The village is populated by Kurds.
