= Amirabad-e Pain, Kerman =

Amirabad-e Pain اميرابادپايين
- Village
- Location within Iran
- Coordinates: 28°24′17″N 57°46′52″E
- Country: Iran
- Province: Kerman
- County: Anbarabad
- Bakhsh: Esmaili
- Rural District: Hoseynabad

Population (2006)
  - Total: 146
- Time zone: UTC+3:30 (IRST)
  - Summer (DST): UTC+4:30 (IRDT)

Amirabad-e Pain (Persian: اميرابادپايين, also Romanized as Amīrābād-e Pā’īn; also known as Amīrābād, Amīrābād-e Soflá, and Amir Abad Sofla) is a village in Hoseynabad Rural District, Esmaili District, Anbarabad County, Kerman Province, Iran. At the 2006 census, its population was 146, in 27 families.
