= Mirabad-e Ansari =

Mirabad-e Ansari ميرابادانصاري
- Village
- Location within Iran
- Coordinates: 28°53′39″N 58°49′21″E
- Country: Iran
- Province: Kerman
- County: Fahraj
- Bakhsh: Central
- Rural District: Fahraj

Population (2006)
  - Total: 643
- Time zone: UTC+3:30 (IRST)
  - Summer (DST): UTC+4:30 (IRDT)

Mirabad-e Ansari (Persian: ميرابادانصاري, also Romanized as Mīrābād-e Anşārī; also known as Mīrābād) is a village in Fahraj Rural District, in the Central District of Fahraj County, Kerman Province, Iran. At the 2006 census, its population was 643, in 149 families.
