= Amirabad Haq Nader =

Amirabad Haq Nader اميرابادحق ندر
- Village
- Location within Iran
- Coordinates: 33°52′55″N 48°13′43″E
- Country: Iran
- Province: Lorestan
- County: Selseleh
- Bakhsh: Central
- Rural District: Yusefvand

Population (2006)
  - Total: 238
- Time zone: UTC+3:30 (IRST)
  - Summer (DST): UTC+4:30 (IRDT)

Amirabad Haq Nader (Persian: اميرابادحق ندر, also Romanized as Amīrābād Haq Nader; also known as Amīrābād) is a village in Yusefvand Rural District, in the Central District of Selseleh County, Lorestan Province, Iran. At the 2006 census, its population was 238, in 43 families.
