= Gashur-e Amirabad =

Gashur-e Amirabad گشوراميراباد
- Village
- Location within Iran
- Coordinates: 34°15′00″N 47°43′00″E
- Country: Iran
- Province: Lorestan
- County: Delfan
- Bakhsh: Kakavand
- Rural District: Kakavand-e Sharqi

Population (2006)
  - Total: 66
- Time zone: UTC+3:30 (IRST)
  - Summer (DST): UTC+4:30 (IRDT)

Gashur-e Amirabad (Persian: گشوراميراباد, also Romanized as Gashūr-e Āmīrābād; also known as Gashūr-e Soflá) is a village in Kakavand-e Sharqi Rural District, Kakavand District, Delfan County, Lorestan Province, Iran. At the 2006 census, its population was 66, in 13 families.
