= Amirabad-e Karbalayi Khosrow =

Amirabad-e Karbalayi Khosrow اميرابادكربلايي خسرو
- Village
- Location within Iran
- Coordinates: 30°37′48″N 52°43′48″E
- Country: Iran
- Province: Fars
- County: Eqlid
- Bakhsh: Central
- Rural District: Khonjesht

Population (2006)
  - Total: 47
- Time zone: UTC+3:30 (IRST)
  - Summer (DST): UTC+4:30 (IRDT)

Amirabad-e Karbalayi Khosrow (Persian: اميرابادكربلايي خسرو, also Romanized as Amīrābād-e Karbalāyī Khosrow; also known as Amīrābād) is a village in Khonjesht Rural District, in the Central District of Eqlid County, Fars province, Iran. At the 2006 census, its population was 47, in 14 families.
