= Qaleh Shah-e Pirabad =

Qaleh Shah-e Pirabad قلعه شاه پيراباد
- Village
- Location within Iran
- Coordinates: 30°47′49″N 50°13′01″E
- Country: Iran
- Province: Khuzestan
- County: Behbahan
- Bakhsh: Tashan
- Rural District: Tashan-e Sharqi

Population (2006)
  - Total: 19
- Time zone: UTC+3:30 (IRST)
  - Summer (DST): UTC+4:30 (IRDT)

Qaleh Shah-e Pirabad (Persian: قلعه شاه پيراباد, also Romanized as Qal‘eh Shāh-e Pīrābād; also known as Pīrābād) is a village in Tashan-e Sharqi Rural District, Tashan District, Behbahan County, Khuzestan Province, Iran. At the 2006 census, its population was 19, in 5 families.
