= Mirabad, Saqqez =

Mirabad مير آباد
- Village
- Location within Iran
- Coordinates: 36°06′52″N 46°46′32″E
- Country: Iran
- Province: Kurdistan
- County: Saqqez
- Bakhsh: Ziviyeh
- Rural District: Tilakuh

Population (2006)
  - Total: 127
- Time zone: UTC+3:30 (IRST)
  - Summer (DST): UTC+4:30 (IRDT)

Mirabad (Persian: مير آباد, also Romanized as Mīrābād) is a village in Tilakuh Rural District, Ziviyeh District, Saqqez County, Kurdistan Province, Iran. At the 2006 census, its population was 127, in 23 families. The village is populated by Kurds.
