= Amirabad-e Sili Zardi =

Amirabad-e Sili Zardi اميرابادسيلي زردي
- Village
- Location within Iran
- Coordinates: 29°29′38″N 52°11′47″E
- Country: Iran
- Province: Fars
- County: Shiraz
- Bakhsh: Arzhan
- Rural District: Kuh Mareh Sorkhi

Population (2006)
  - Total: 135
- Time zone: UTC+3:30 (IRST)
  - Summer (DST): UTC+4:30 (IRDT)

Amirabad-e Sili Zardi (Persian: اميرابادسيلي زردي, also Romanized as Amīrābād-e Sīlī Zardī; also known as Amīrābād) is a village in Kuh Mareh Sorkhi Rural District, Arzhan District, Shiraz County, Fars province, Iran. At the 2006 census, its population was 135, in 25 families.
