= Amirabad-e Kord =

Amirabad-e Kord اميرابادكرد
- Village
- Location within Iran
- Coordinates: 34°58′34″N 49°05′30″E
- Country: Iran
- Province: Hamadan
- County: Hamadan
- Bakhsh: Shara
- Rural District: Jeyhun Dasht

Population (2006)
  - Total: 332
- Time zone: UTC+3:30 (IRST)
  - Summer (DST): UTC+4:30 (IRDT)

Amirabad-e Kord (Persian: اميرابادكرد, also Romanized as Amīrābād-e Kord; also known as Amīrābād, Amīrābād-e ‘Alīqolī, and Amrābād Kurd) is a village in Jeyhun Dasht Rural District, Shara District, Hamadan County, Hamadan Province, Iran. At the 2006 census, its population was 332, in 80 families.
