= Mirabad-e Olya =

Mirabad-e Olya مير آباد عليا
- Village
- Location within Iran
- Coordinates: 36°03′32″N 45°49′49″E
- Country: Iran
- Province: Kurdistan
- County: Baneh
- Bakhsh: Namshir
- Rural District: Kani Sur

Population (2006)
  - Total: 187
- Time zone: UTC+3:30 (IRST)
  - Summer (DST): UTC+4:30 (IRDT)

Mirabad-e Olya (Persian: مير آباد عليا, also Romanized as Mīrābād-e ‘Olyā; also known as Mīrābād-e Bālā) is a village in Kani Sur Rural District, Namshir District, Baneh County, Kurdistan Province, Iran. At the 2006 census, its population was 187, in 37 families. The village is populated by Kurds.
