= Amirabad-e Shul =

Amirabad-e Shul اميرابادشول
- Village
- Location within Iran
- Coordinates: 29°13′03″N 55°50′55″E
- Country: Iran
- Province: Kerman
- County: Sirjan
- Bakhsh: Central
- Rural District: Malekabad

Population (2006)
  - Total: 1,548
- Time zone: UTC+3:30 (IRST)
  - Summer (DST): UTC+4:30 (IRDT)

Amirabad-e Shul (Persian: اميرابادشول, also Romanized as Amīrābād-e Shūl; also known as Amīrābād) is a village in Malekabad Rural District, in the Central District of Sirjan County, Kerman Province, Iran. At the 2006 census, its population was 1,548, in 355 families.
