= Chaman-e Amirabad =

Chaman-e Amirabad چمن اميراباد
- Village
- Location within Iran
- Coordinates: 36°32′35″N 49°07′17″E
- Country: Iran
- Province: Qazvin
- County: Qazvin
- Bakhsh: Tarom Sofla
- Rural District: Chuqur

Population (2015)
  - Total: 150
- Time zone: UTC+3:30 (IRST)
  - Summer (DST): UTC+4:30 (IRDT)

Chaman-e Amirabad (Persian: چمن اميراباد, also Romanized as Chaman-e Amīrābād; also known as Amīrābād) is a village in Chuqur Rural District, Tarom Sofla District, Qazvin County, Qazvin Province, Iran. At the 2006 census, its population was 87, in 19 families.
