= Amirabad-e Sarzeh =

Amirabad-e Sarzeh اميرابادسرزه
- Village
- Location within Iran
- Coordinates: 32°48′00″N 59°34′33″E
- Country: Iran
- Province: South Khorasan
- County: Sarbisheh
- Bakhsh: Mud
- Rural District: Mud

Population (2006)
  - Total: 106
- Time zone: UTC+3:30 (IRST)
  - Summer (DST): UTC+4:30 (IRDT)

Amirabad-e Sarzeh (Persian: اميرابادسرزه, also Romanized as Amīrābād-e Sarzeh) is a village in Mud Rural District, Mud District, Sarbisheh County, South Khorasan Province, Iran. According to the 2006 census, it had a population was 106, living in 28 families.
