= Amirabad, Ahmadabad =

Amirabad اميراباد
- Village
- Location within Iran
- Coordinates: 35°53′06″N 59°31′33″E
- Country: Iran
- Province: Razavi Khorasan
- County: Mashhad
- Bakhsh: Ahmadabad
- Rural District: Sarjam

Population (2006)
  - Total: 167
- Time zone: UTC+3:30 (IRST)
  - Summer (DST): UTC+4:30 (IRDT)

Amirabad (Persian: اميراباد, also Romanized as Amīrābād) is a village in Sarjam Rural District, Ahmadabad District, Mashhad County, Razavi Khorasan Province, Iran. At the 2006 census, its population was 167, in 38 families.

== See also ==
- List of cities, towns and villages in Razavi Khorasan Province
