= Mirabad, Marivan =

Mirabad مير آباد
- Village
- Location within Iran
- Coordinates: 35°38′33″N 46°04′18″E
- Country: Iran
- Province: Kurdistan
- County: Marivan
- Bakhsh: Khav and Mirabad
- Rural District: Khav and Mirabad

Population (2006)
  - Total: 293
- Time zone: UTC+3:30 (IRST)
  - Summer (DST): UTC+4:30 (IRDT)

Mirabad (Persian: مير آباد, also Romanized as Mīrābād) is a village in Khav and Mirabad Rural District, Khav and Mirabad District, Marivan County, Kurdistan Province, Iran. At the 2006 census, its population was 293, in 60 families. The village is populated by Kurds.
