= Deh-e Soltan, Sistan and Baluchestan =

Deh-e Soltan ده سلطان
- Village
- Location within Iran
- Coordinates: 31°11′07″N 61°38′49″E
- Country: Iran
- Province: Sistan and Baluchestan
- County: Hirmand
- Bakhsh: Central
- Rural District: Margan

Population (2006)
  - Total: 134
- Time zone: UTC+3:30 (IRST)
  - Summer (DST): UTC+4:30 (IRDT)

Deh-e Soltan (Persian: ده سلطان, also Romanized as Deh-e Solţān; also known as Solţānī) is a village in Margan Rural District, in the Central District of Hirmand County, Sistan and Baluchestan Province, Iran. At the 2006 census, its population was 134, in 29 families.
