= Oshvand =

Oshvand عشوند
- Village
- Location within Iran
- Coordinates: 34°12′08″N 48°28′10″E
- Country: Iran
- Province: Hamadan
- County: Nahavand
- Bakhsh: Central
- Rural District: Shaban

Population (2006)
  - Total: 611
- Time zone: UTC+3:30 (IRST)
  - Summer (DST): UTC+4:30 (IRDT)

Oshvand (Persian: عشوند, also Romanized as ‘Oshvand and Eshvand; also known as Amīrābād, Āshīnad, and Oshyand) is a village in Shaban Rural District, in the Central District of Nahavand County, Hamadan Province, Iran. At the 2006 census, its population was 611, in 140 families.
