= Badiabad, Hamadan =

Badiabad بديع اباد
- Village
- Location within Iran
- Coordinates: 34°06′33″N 48°28′32″E
- Country: Iran
- Province: Hamadan
- County: Nahavand
- Bakhsh: Central
- Rural District: Gamasiyab

Population (2006)
  - Total: 108
- Time zone: UTC+3:30 (IRST)
  - Summer (DST): UTC+4:30 (IRDT)

Badiabad (Persian: بديع اباد, also Romanized as Badī‘ābād; also known as Amīrābad, Amīrābād Gūsheh, and Amir Abad Olya) is a village in Gamasiyab Rural District, in the Central District of Nahavand County, Hamadan Province, Iran. At the 2006 census, its population was 108, in 33 families.
