= Mirabad-e Rigan =

Mirabad-e Rigan ميرابادريگان
- Village
- Location within Iran
- Coordinates: 28°38′34″N 58°59′52″E
- Country: Iran
- Province: Kerman
- County: Rigan
- Bakhsh: Central
- Rural District: Rigan

Population (2006)
  - Total: 1,410
- Time zone: UTC+3:30 (IRST)
  - Summer (DST): UTC+4:30 (IRDT)

Mirabad-e Rigan (Persian: ميرابادريگان, also Romanized as Mīrābād-e Rīgān and Mīrābād Rīgān; also known as Mīrābād and Pīrābād) is a village in Rigan Rural District, in the Central District of Rigan County, Kerman Province, Iran. At the 2006 census, its population was 1,410, in 290 families.
