= Amirabad-e Olya =

Amirabad-e Olya اميرابادعليا
- Village
- Location within Iran
- Coordinates: 30°36′56″N 51°26′42″E
- Country: Iran
- Province: Kohgiluyeh and Boyer-Ahmad
- County: Boyer-Ahmad
- Bakhsh: Central
- Rural District: Dasht-e Rum

Population (2006)
  - Total: 337
- Time zone: UTC+3:30 (IRST)
  - Summer (DST): UTC+4:30 (IRDT)

Amirabad-e Olya (Persian: اميرابادعليا, also Romanized as Amīrābād-e ‘Olyā) is a village in Dasht-e Rum Rural District, in the Central District of Boyer-Ahmad County, Kohgiluyeh and Boyer-Ahmad Province, Iran. At the 2006 census, its population was 337, in 68 families.
