= Mirabad-e Arjormand =

Mirabad-e Arjormand ميرابادارجمند
- Village
- Location within Iran
- Coordinates: 28°54′48″N 58°43′30″E
- Country: Iran
- Province: Kerman
- County: Narmashir
- Bakhsh: Central
- Rural District: Azizabad

Population (2006)
  - Total: 747
- Time zone: UTC+3:30 (IRST)
  - Summer (DST): UTC+4:30 (IRDT)

Mirabad-e Arjormand (Persian: ميرابادارجمند, also Romanized as Mīrābād-e Arjormand; also known as Mīrābād and Pīrābād) is a village in Azizabad Rural District, in the Central District of Narmashir County, Kerman Province, Iran. At the 2006 census, its population was 747, in 154 families.
