= Amirabad-e Bala =

Amirabad-e Bala اميرابادبالا
- Village
- Location within Iran
- Coordinates: 28°25′34″N 57°46′50″E
- Country: Iran
- Province: Kerman
- County: Anbarabad
- Bakhsh: Esmaili
- Rural District: Hoseynabad

Population (2006)
  - Total: 452
- Time zone: UTC+3:30 (IRST)
  - Summer (DST): UTC+4:30 (IRDT)

Amirabad-e Bala (Persian: اميرابادبالا, also Romanized as Amīrābād-e Bālā; also known as Amīrābād-e ‘Olyā and Amir Abad Olya) is a village in Hoseynabad Rural District, Esmaili District, Anbarabad County, Kerman Province, Iran. At the 2006 census, its population was 452, in 89 families.
