= Amirabad-e Nazarian =

Amirabad-e Nazarian اميرابادنظريان
- Village
- Location within Iran
- Coordinates: 28°24′20″N 57°52′20″E
- Country: Iran
- Province: Kerman
- County: Anbarabad
- Bakhsh: Central
- Rural District: Jahadabad

Population (2006)
  - Total: 1,571
- Time zone: UTC+3:30 (IRST)
  - Summer (DST): UTC+4:30 (IRDT)

Amirabad-e Nazarian (Persian: اميرابادنظريان, also Romanized as Amīrābād-e Naz̧arīān; also known as Amīrābād, and Mīrābād) is a village in Jahadabad Rural District, in the Central District of Anbarabad County, Kerman Province, Iran. At the 2006 census, its population was 1,571, in 364 families.
