= Aradan, Iran =

City in Semnan province, Iran

Aradan Persian: آرادان
- City
- Location within Iran
- Coordinates: 35°14′59″N 52°29′40″E
- Country: Iran
- Province: Semnan
- County: Aradan
- District: Central

Population (2016)
  - Total: 6,257
- Time zone: UTC+3:30 (IRST)

Aradan (Persian: آرادان) (Note: Also romanized as Ārādān; also known as Ardān and Āzādān) is a city in the Central District of Aradan County, Semnan province, Iran, serving as capital of both the county and the district.

Aradan corresponds with the ancient city of Choara (Khuwar), located in the historical region of Qumis, along the Great Khorasan Road. It is the birthplace of the former President of Iran, Mahmoud Ahmadinejad.

== Demographics ==
=== Population ===
At the time of the 2006 National Census, the city's population was 4,959 in 1,380 households, when it was capital of the former Aradan District of Garmsar County. The following census in 2011 counted 5,626 people in 1,750 households. The 2016 census measured the population of the city as 6,257 people in 2,093 households, by which time the district had been separated from the county in the establishment of Aradan County. Aradan was transferred to the new Central District as the county's capital.
