= Mirabad, Darmian =

Mirabad ميراباد
- Village
- Location within Iran
- Coordinates: 33°07′06″N 59°48′06″E
- Country: Iran
- Province: South Khorasan
- County: Darmian
- Bakhsh: Qohestan
- Rural District: Qohestan

Population (2006)
  - Total: 25
- Time zone: UTC+3:30 (IRST)
  - Summer (DST): UTC+4:30 (IRDT)

Mirabad (Persian: ميراباد, also Romanized as Mīrābād; also known as Amīrābād and Kalāteh-ye Amīrī) is a village in Qohestan Rural District, Qohestan District, Darmian County, South Khorasan Province, Iran. At the 2006 census, its population was 25, in 7 families.
