= Yateri Rural District =

Rural district in Semnan province, Iran

Yateri Rural District Persian: دهستان ياترئ
- Rural District
- Location within Iran
- Coordinates: 34°51′N 52°30′E
- Country: Iran
- Province: Semnan
- County: Aradan
- District: Central
- Established: 1987
- Capital: Davarabad

Population (2016)
  - Total: 2,528
- Time zone: UTC+3:30 (IRST)

Yateri Rural District (Persian: دهستان ياترئ) is in the Central District of Aradan County, Semnan province, Iran. Its capital is the village of Davarabad.

== Demographics ==
=== Population ===
At the time of the 2006 National Census, the rural district's population (as a part of the former Aradan District in Garmsar County) was 5,714 in 1,665 households. There were 6,181 inhabitants in 1,911 households at the following census of 2011. The 2016 census measured the population of the rural district as 2,528 in 947 households, by which time the district had been separated from the county in the establishment of Aradan County. The rural district was transferred to the new Central District. The most populous of its 39 villages was Davarabad, with 1,074 people.

=== Other villages in the rural district ===
- Aluak
- Amirabad
- Emamzadeh Ali Akbar
- Hashtabad
- Jalilabad
- Qaleh-ye Akbarabad
- Sarab Rud
- Sudaghlan
- Taqiabad
- Yateri-ye Bala
- Yateri-ye Pain
