= Kohanabad District =

District in Semnan province, Iran

Kohanabad District Persian: بخش کهن آباد
- District
- Location within Iran
- Coordinates: 34°56′N 52°45′E
- Country: Iran
- Province: Semnan
- County: Aradan
- Established: 2011
- Capital: Kohanabad

Population (2016)
  - Total: 2,824
- Time zone: UTC+3:30 (IRST)

Kohanabad District (Persian: بخش کهن آباد) is in Aradan County, Semnan province, Iran. Its capital is the city of Kohanabad.

== History ==
In 2011, Aradan District was separated from Garmsar County in the establishment of Aradan County, which was divided into one district of two rural districts, with Aradan as its capital and only city at the time. Later in the same year, Kohanabad Rural District was separated from the Central District in the formation of Kohanabad District, and the village of Kohanabad was converted to a city.

== Demographics ==
=== Population ===
At the time of the 2016 National Census, the district's population was 2,824 inhabitants in 1,081 households.

=== Administrative divisions ===
Kohanabad District Population
Administrative Divisions	2016
Faravan RD	1,134
Kohanabad RD	498
Kohanabad (city)	1,192
Total	2,824
RD = Rural District
