= Kohanabad Rural District =

Rural district in Semnan province, Iran

Kohanabad Rural District Persian: دهستان كهن آباد
- Rural District
- Location within Iran
- Coordinates: 35°23′N 52°35′E
- Country: Iran
- Province: Semnan
- County: Aradan
- District: Kohanabad
- Established: 1991
- Capital: Kohanabad

Population (2016)
  - Total: 498
- Time zone: UTC+3:30 (IRST)

Kohanabad Rural District (Persian: دهستان كهن آباد) is in Kohanabad District of Aradan County, Semnan province, Iran. It is administered from the city of Kohanabad.

== Demographics ==
=== Population ===
At the time of the 2006 National Census, the rural district's population (as a part of the former Aradan District in Garmsar County) was 4,745 in 1,392 households. There were 3,768 inhabitants in 1,221 households at the following census of 2011. The 2016 census measured the population of the rural district as 498 in 195 households, by which time the district had been separated from the county in the establishment of Aradan County. The rural district was transferred to the new Central District, and later in the year, it was separated from the district in the formation of Kohanabad District. The most populous of its six villages was Kand-e Qoli Khan, with 432 people.

=== Other villages in the rural district ===
- Qaleh Kharabeh
