= Aradan County =

County in Semnan province, Iran

Aradan County Persian: شهرستان آرادان
- County
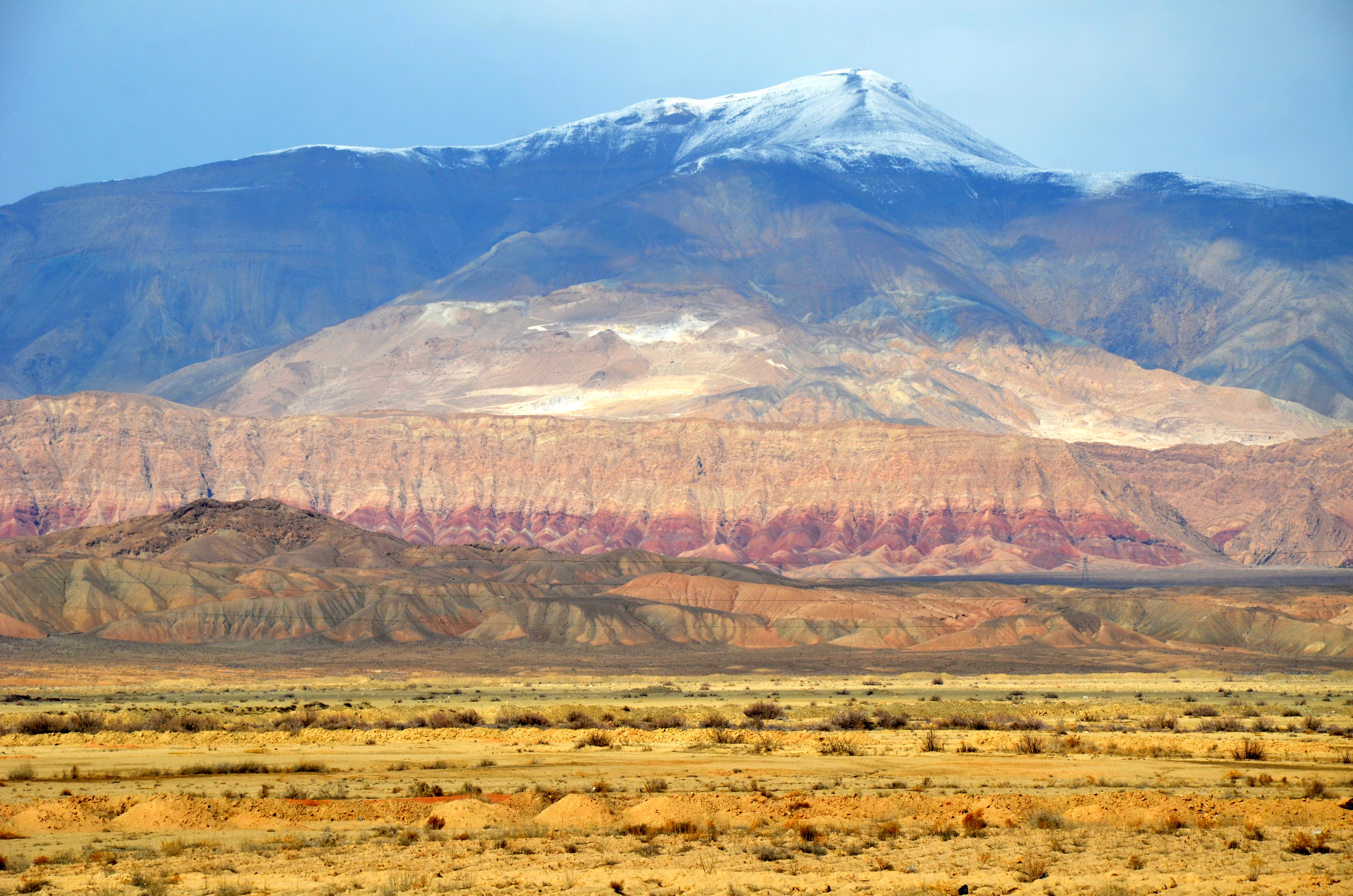
- Landscape near the village of Deh Namak

- Location of Aradan County in Semnan Province (left, purple)

- Location of Semnan province in Iran
- Coordinates: 34°56′N 52°37′E
- Country: Iran
- Province: Semnan
- Established: 2011
- Capital: Aradan
- Districts: Central, Kohanabad

Population (2016)
  - Total: 13,884
- Time zone: UTC+3:30 (IRST)

Aradan County (Persian: شهرستان آرادان) is in Semnan province, Iran. Its capital is the city of Aradan.

== History ==
In 2011, Aradan District was separated from Garmsar County in the establishment of Aradan County, which was divided into one district of two rural districts, with Aradan as its capital and only city at the time. Later in the same year, Hoseynabad-e Kordehha Rural District was created in the Central District, and Kohanabad Rural District was separated from it in the formation of Kohanabad District. The new district was divided into two rural districts, including the new Faravan Rural District, and the village of Kohanabad was converted to a city.

== Demographics ==
=== Population ===
At the time of the 2016 National Census, the county's population was 13,884 in 4,919 households.

=== Administrative divisions ===
Aradan County's population and administrative structure are shown in the following table.

Aradan County Population
Administrative Divisions	2016
Central District	11,060
Hoseynabad-e Kordehha RD	2,275
Yateri RD	2,528
Aradan (city)	6,257
Kohanabad District	2,824
Faravan RD	1,134
Kohanabad RD	498
Kohanabad (city)	1,192
Total	13,884
RD = Rural District

== See also ==
- Deh Namak Caravanserai

Media related to Aradan County at Wikimedia Commons
