= Central District (Aradan County) =

District in Semnan province, Iran

Central District (Aradan County) Persian: بخش مرکزی شهرستان آرادان
- District
- Location within Iran
- Coordinates: 34°51′N 52°32′E
- Country: Iran
- Province: Semnan
- County: Aradan
- Established: 2011
- Capital: Aradan

Population (2016)
  - Total: 11,060
- Time zone: UTC+3:30 (IRST)

The Central District of Aradan County (Persian: بخش مرکزی شهرستان آرادان) is in Semnan province, Iran. Its capital is the city of Aradan.

== History ==
In 2011, Aradan District was separated from Garmsar County in the establishment of Aradan County, which was divided into one district of two rural districts, with Aradan as its capital and only city at the time. Later in the same year, Hoseynabad-e Kordehha Rural District was created in the Central District, and Kohanabad Rural District was separated from it in the formation of Kohanabad District.

== Demographics ==
=== Population ===
At the time of the 2016 National Census, the district's population was 11,060 inhabitants in 3,838 households.

=== Administrative divisions ===
Central District (Aradan County) Population
Administrative Divisions	2016
Hoseynabad-e Kordehha RD	2,275
Yateri RD	2,528
Aradan (city)	6,257
Total	11,060
RD = Rural District
