= Aradan District =

Former district in Semnan province, Iran

Aradan District Persian: بخش آرادان
- Former District
- Location within Iran
- Coordinates: 34°56′N 52°37′E
- Country: Iran
- Province: Semnan
- County: Garmsar
- Established: 1995
- Capital: Aradan

Population (2011)
  - Total: 15,575
- Time zone: UTC+3:30 (IRST)

Aradan District (Persian: بخش آرادان) is a former administrative division of Garmsar County, Semnan province, Iran. Its capital was the city of Aradan.

== Demographics ==
=== Population ===
At the time of the 2006 National Census, the district's population was 15,418 in 4,437 households. The following census in 2011 counted 15,575 people in 4,882 households.

In 2011, the district was separated from the county in the establishment of Aradan County.

=== Administrative divisions ===
Aradan District Population
Administrative Divisions	2006	2011
Kohanabad RD	4,745	3,768
Yateri RD	5,714	6,181
Aradan (city)	4,959	5,626
Total	15,418	15,575
RD = Rural District
