= Salehabad =

Salehabad or Salihabad or Salhabad or Salahabad (Persian: صالح اباد) may refer to:

== Iran ==
=== Chaharmahal and Bakhtiari Province ===
- Salehabad, Chaharmahal and Bakhtiari, a village in Kuhrang County

=== Fars Province ===
- Salehabad, Arsanjan, a village in Arsanjan County
- Salehabad, Estahban, a village in Estahban County
- Salehabad, Fasa, a village in Fasa County
- Salehabad, Neyriz, a village in Neyriz County

=== Golestan Province ===
- Salehabad, Golestan, a village in Kalaleh County

=== Hamadan Province ===
- Salehabad, Hamadan, Iran
- Salehabad District (Hamadan Province), Iran
- Salehabad Rural District (Hamadan Province), Iran

=== Hormozgan Province ===
- Salehabad, Bastak
- Salehabad, Hajjiabad

=== Ilam Province ===
- Salehabad, Ilam
- Salehabad District (Ilam Province)

=== Isfahan Province ===
- Salehabad, Natanz, a village in Natanz County

=== Kerman Province ===
- Salehabad, Baft, a village in Baft County
- Salehabad, Fahraj, a village in Fahraj County
- Salehabad, Sirjan, a village in Sirjan County

=== Kermanshah Province ===
- Salehabad, Kermanshah, a village in Kermanshah County

=== Kurdistan Province ===
- Salehabad, Baneh, a village in Baneh County
- Salehabad, Kamyaran, a village in Kamyaran County
- Salehabad, Saqqez, a village in Saqqez County

=== Lorestan Province ===
- Salehabad, Lorestan, Iran
- Salehabad Amid Ali, Lorestan, Iran

=== Markazi Province ===
- Salehabad, Arak, a village in Arak County
- Salehabad, Ashtian, a village in Ashtian County
- Salehabad, Saveh, a village in Saveh County

=== Mazandaran Province ===
- Salehabad, Sari, a village in Sari County
- Salehabad, Tonekabon, a village in Tonekabon County

=== Razavi Khorasan Province ===
- Salehabad, Razavi Khorasan, a city in Torbat-e Jam County
- Salehabad Rural District (Razavi Khorasan Province), in Torbat-e Jam County
- Salehabad, Gonabad
- Salehabad, Mazul, Nishapur County
- Salehabad, Rivand, Nishapur County
- Salehabad-e Bozorg, Sabzevar County
- Salehabad County

=== Semnan Province ===
- Salehabad, Damghan
- Saleh Abad, Damghan
- Salehabad, Shahrud
- Salehabad, Beyarjomand, Shahrud County

=== Tehran Province ===
- Salehieh, a city in Tehran province
- Salehabad, Damavand, Tehran province, Iran
- Salehabad, Pishva, Tehran province, Iran
- Salehabad, Qarchak, a village in Qarchak County
- Salehabad, alternate name of Mehrdasht, Tehran, Iran
- Salehabad-e Hesar-e Shalpush, Tehran province, Iran
- Salehabad-e Seyyedabad, Tehran province, Iran
- Salehabad-e Sharqi, a village in Rey County
- Salehabad Rural District (Baharestan County), Tehran province

=== West Azerbaijan Province ===
- Salehabad, Khoy, a village in Khoy County
- Salehabad, Urmia, a village in Urmia County

=== Yazd Province ===
- Salehabad, Yazd, a village in Taft County

=== Zanjan Province ===
- Salehabad, Zanjan, a village in Khodabandeh County

== Pakistan ==
- Salehabad, Pakistan

== See also ==
- Solhabad (disambiguation)
