= Alamabad =

Alamabad or Elmabad (Persian: اعلم‌آباد) may refer to:

- Alamabad, Fars
- Alamabad, Kerman
- Alamabad-e Mohandes, Khuzestan
- Alamabad, Lorestan (disambiguation)
  - Alamabad, Dorud
  - Alamabad, Selseleh
  - Alamabad-e Sofla
- Alamabad, Khash, Sistan and Baluchestan Province
- Alamabad, Mirjaveh, Sistan and Baluchestan Province
- Elmabad, West Azerbaijan
