= Chenareh (disambiguation) =

Chenareh is a city in Kurdistan Province, Iran.

Chenareh (Persian: چناره) may also refer to:

- Chenar-e Pain
- Chenareh, Kermanshah
- Chenareh-ye Ali Madad, Kermanshah Province
- Chenareh-ye Latif, Kermanshah Province
- Chenareh-ye Majid, Kermanshah Province
- Chenareh, Sanandaj, Kurdistan Province
- Chenareh, Saqqez, Kurdistan Province
- Chenareh, Lorestan
- Chenareh-ye Olya
- Chenareh-ye Sofla
