= Jamshidabad =

Jamshidabad (Persian: جمشيداباد) may refer to:

== Gilan Province ==
- Jamshidabad, Gilan, a village in Rudbar County

== Hamdan Province ==
- Jamshidabad, Hamadan

== Kerman Province ==
- Jamshidabad, Kerman, a village in Anar County

== Lorestan Province ==
- Jamshidabad, Delfan, Lorestan Province, Iran
- Jamshidabad, Qaleh-ye Mozaffari, a village in Qaleh-ye Mozaffari Rural District, Central District, Selseleh County, Lorestan Province, Iran
- Jamshidabad, Yusefvand, a village in Yusefvand Rural District, Central District, Selseleh County, Lorestan Province, Iran
- Jamshidabad-e Heydar, Khorramabad County, Lorestan Province, Iran
- Jamshidabad-e Mirza, Khorramabad County, Lorestan Province, Iran

== Markazi Province ==
- Jamshidabad, Markazi

== Mazandaran Province ==
- Jamshidabad, Mazandaran, a village in Amol County

== South Khorasan Province ==
- Jamshidabad, South Khorasan, a village in Khusf County
