= Darreh Tang =

Darreh Tang (Persian: دره‌تنگ) may refer to:

- Darreh Tang, Shahr-e Babak, Kerman Province
- Darreh Tang, Lorestan
- Darreh Tang-e Olya, Lorestan Province
- Darreh Tang-e Sofla, Lorestan Province
