= Kordabad =

Kordabad or Kerdabad or Kardabad or Kord Abad or Kard Abad (Persian: كرداباد) may refer to:

- Kordabad, East Azerbaijan
- Kordabad, Gilan
- Kordabad, Golestan
- Kordabad, Aqqala, Golestan Province
- Kerdabad, Hamadan
- Kordabad, Isfahan
- Kordabad-e Olya, Lorestan Province
- Kordabad-e Sofla, Lorestan Province
- Kordabad, Markazi
- Kerdabad, Mazandaran
- Kordabad, Semnan
- Kordabad, South Khorasan
- Kordabad, Yazd
- Kerdabad, Mehriz, Yazd Province
- Kordabad, Zanjan
