= Mian Volan =

Mian Volan or Meyan Velan or Mian Velan (Persian: ميان ولان) may refer to:

- Mian Volan-e Olya
- Mian Volan-e Sofla
- Mian Volan-e Vosta
