= Cheshmeh-ye Shah Qoli =

Cheshmeh-ye Shah Qoli چشمه شاه قلي
- Village
- Location within Iran
- Coordinates: 33°44′46″N 48°07′16″E
- Country: Iran
- Province: Lorestan
- County: Selseleh
- Bakhsh: Central
- Rural District: Honam

Population (2006)
  - Total: 246
- Time zone: UTC+3:30 (IRST)
  - Summer (DST): UTC+4:30 (IRDT)

Cheshmeh-ye Shah Qoli (Persian: چشمه شاه قلي, also Romanized as Cheshmeh-ye Shāh Qolī and Cheshmeh Shāh Qolī) is a village in Honam Rural District, in the Central District of Selseleh County, Lorestan Province, Iran. At the 2006 census, its population was 246, in 58 families.
