= Hamvar-e Kulivand =

Hamvar-e Kulivand همواركوليوند
- Village
- Location within Iran
- Coordinates: 33°44′34″N 48°10′04″E
- Country: Iran
- Province: Lorestan
- County: Selseleh
- Bakhsh: Central
- Rural District: Honam

Population (2006)
  - Total: 59
- Time zone: UTC+3:30 (IRST)
  - Summer (DST): UTC+4:30 (IRDT)

Hamvar-e Kulivand (Persian: همواركوليوند, also Romanized as Hamvār-e Kūlīvand and Hamvar-e Kūlīvand) is a village in Honam Rural District, in the Central District of Selseleh County, Lorestan Province, Iran. At the 2006 census, its population was 59, in 19 families.
