= Kamar Siah =

Kamar Siah كمرسياه
- Village
- Location within Iran
- Coordinates: 33°49′22″N 48°15′16″E
- Country: Iran
- Province: Lorestan
- County: Selseleh
- Bakhsh: Central
- Rural District: Honam

Population (2006)
  - Total: 152
- Time zone: UTC+3:30 (IRST)
  - Summer (DST): UTC+4:30 (IRDT)

Kamar Siah (Persian: كمرسياه, also Romanized as Kamar Sīāh and Kamar Seyāh; also known as Sīāh Kamareh-ye Soflá, Asadābād-e Kamar Sīāh, Kamareh Sīāh, and Kamar Sīāh-e Soflá) is a village in Honam Rural District, in the Central District of Selseleh County, Lorestan Province, Iran. At the 2006 census, its population was 152, in 30 families.
