= Mohammadabad-e Ayala =

Village in Tehran province, Iran

Mohammadabad-e Ayala Persian: محمداباداعلا
- Village
- Location within Iran
- Coordinates: 35°25′55″N 51°33′10″E
- Country: Iran
- Province: Tehran
- County: Qarchak
- District: Central
- Rural District: Valiabad

Population (2016)
  - Total: 5,306
- Time zone: UTC+3:30 (IRST)

Mohammadabad-e Ayala (Persian: محمداباداعلا) (Note: Also romanized as Moḩammadābād-e Āyʿalā; also known as Moḩammadābād and Moḩammadābād-e Pāzūkī) is a village in Valiabad Rural District of the Central District in Qarchak County, Tehran province, Iran.

== Demographics ==
=== Population ===
At the time of the 2006 National Census, the village's population was 5,044 in 1,213 households, when it was in the former Qarchak District of Varamin County. The following census in 2011 counted 5,283 people in 1,411 households. The 2016 census measured the population of the village as 5,306 people in 1,505 households, by which time the district had been separated from the county in the establishment of Qarchak County. The rural district was transferred to the new Central District.
