= Mahmudabad-e Tabat Bayi =

Village in Tehran province, Iran

Mahmudabad-e Tabat Bayi Persian: محمودابادطباطبائي
- Village
- Country: Iran
- Province: Tehran
- County: Qarchak
- District: Central
- Rural District: Valiabad

Population (2016)
  - Total: 63
- Time zone: UTC+3:30 (IRST)

Mahmudabad-e Tabat Bayi (Persian: محمودابادطباطبائي) (Note: Also romanized as Maḥmūdābād-e Tabāṭ Bāyī) is a village in Valiabad Rural District of the Central District in Qarchak County, Tehran province, Iran.

== Demographics ==
=== Population ===
At the time of the 2006 National Census, the village's population was 19 in six households, when it was in the former Qarchak District of Varamin County. The following census in 2011 counted a population below the reporting threshold. The 2016 census measured the population of the village as 63 people in 25 households, by which time the district had been separated from the county in the establishment of Qarchak County. The rural district was transferred to the new Central District.
