= Sarab-e Papi =

Sarab-e Papi سرابپاپي
- Village
- Location within Iran
- Coordinates: 33°50′22″N 48°16′26″E
- Country: Iran
- Province: Lorestan
- County: Selseleh
- Bakhsh: Central
- Rural District: Qaleh-ye Mozaffari

Population (2006)
  - Total: 143
- Time zone: UTC+3:30 (IRST)
  - Summer (DST): UTC+4:30 (IRDT)

Sarab-e Papi (Persian: سرابپاپي, also Romanized as Sarāb-e Pāpī) is a village in Qaleh-ye Mozaffari Rural District, in the Central District of Selseleh County, Lorestan Province, Iran. At the 2006 census, its population was 143, in 30 families.
