= Mian Kharan =

Mian Kheran ميان خران
- Village
- Location within Iran
- Coordinates: 33°53′32″N 48°14′02″E
- Country: Iran
- Province: Lorestan
- County: Selseleh
- Bakhsh: Central
- Rural District: Yusefvand

Population (2006)
  - Total: 185
- Time zone: UTC+3:30 (IRST)
  - Summer (DST): UTC+4:30 (IRDT)

Mian Kheran (Persian: ميان خران, also Romanized as Mīān Kharān, Meyān Kherān, and Miyān Kherān) is a village in Yusefvand Rural District, in the Central District of Selseleh County, Lorestan Province, Iran. At the 2006 census, its population was 185, in 40 families.
