= Valiabad, Qarchak =

Village in Tehran province, Iran

Valiabad Persian: ولي اباد
- Village
- Location within Iran
- Coordinates: 35°25′25″N 51°33′24″E
- Country: Iran
- Province: Tehran
- County: Qarchak
- District: Central
- Rural District: Valiabad

Population (2016)
  - Total: 3,680
- Time zone: UTC+3:30 (IRST)

Valiabad (Persian: ولي اباد) (Note: Also romanized as Valīābād) is a village in, and the capital of, Valiabad Rural District in the Central District of Qarchak County, Tehran province, Iran.

== Demographics ==
=== Population ===
At the time of the 2006 National Census, the village's population was 3,663 in 849 households, when it was in the former Qarchak District of Varamin County. The following census in 2011 counted 3,854 people in 971 households. The 2016 census measured the population of the village as 3,680 people in 1,037 households, by which time the district had been separated from the county in the establishment of Qarchak County. The rural district was transferred to the new Central District.
