= Cheshmeh Saleh =

Cheshmeh Saleh چشمه صالح
- Village
- Location within Iran
- Coordinates: 33°39′22″N 48°13′15″E
- Country: Iran
- Province: Lorestan
- County: Selseleh
- Bakhsh: Central
- Rural District: Honam

Population (2006)
  - Total: 44
- Time zone: UTC+3:30 (IRST)
  - Summer (DST): UTC+4:30 (IRDT)

Cheshmeh Saleh (Persian: چشمه صالح, also Romanized as Cheshmeh Şāleḩ) is a village in Honam Rural District, in the Central District of Selseleh County, Lorestan Province, Iran. At the 2006 census, its population was 44, in 10 families.
