= Zir Taq Doab =

Zir Taq Doab زيرطاق دوآب
- Village
- Location within Iran
- Coordinates: 33°47′51″N 48°12′46″E
- Country: Iran
- Province: Lorestan
- County: Selseleh
- Bakhsh: Central
- Rural District: Doab

Population (2006)
  - Total: 88
- Time zone: UTC+3:30 (IRST)
  - Summer (DST): UTC+4:30 (IRDT)

Zir Taq Doab (Persian: زيرطاق دوآب, also Romanized as Zīr Ţāq Doāb; also known as Zīr Ţāq) is a village in Doab Rural District, in the Central District of Selseleh County, Lorestan Province, Iran. At the 2006 census, its population was 88, in 16 families.
