= Sarab Sorkheh Sadeqabad =

Sarab Sorkheh Sadeqabad سراب سرخه صادق اباد
- Village
- Location within Iran
- Coordinates: 33°52′19″N 48°16′53″E
- Country: Iran
- Province: Lorestan
- County: Selseleh
- Bakhsh: Central
- Rural District: Qaleh-ye Mozaffari

Population (2006)
  - Total: 57
- Time zone: UTC+3:30 (IRST)
  - Summer (DST): UTC+4:30 (IRDT)

Sarab Sorkheh Sadeqabad (Persian: سراب سرخه صادق اباد, also Romanized as Sarāb Sorkheh Şādeqābād; also known as Sarāb-e Sorkheh) is a village in Qaleh-ye Mozaffari Rural District, in the Central District of Selseleh County, Lorestan Province, Iran. At the 2006 census, its population was 57, in 13 families.
