= Sarab-e Shahbaz =

Sarab-e Shahbaz سراب شهباز
- Village
- Location within Iran
- Coordinates: 33°41′51″N 48°23′41″E
- Country: Iran
- Province: Lorestan
- County: Selseleh
- Bakhsh: Central
- Rural District: Honam

Population (2006)
  - Total: 33
- Time zone: UTC+3:30 (IRST)
  - Summer (DST): UTC+4:30 (IRDT)

Sarab-e Shahbaz (Persian: سراب شهباز, also Romanized as Sarāb-e Shahbāz; also known as Sarāb-e Shahnāz) is a village in Honam Rural District, in the Central District of Selseleh County, Lorestan Province, Iran. At the 2006 census, its population was 33, in 10 families.
