= Mohammad Tip =

Mohammad Tip محمدتيپ
- Village
- Location within Iran
- Coordinates: 33°48′45″N 48°13′08″E
- Country: Iran
- Province: Lorestan
- County: Selseleh
- Bakhsh: Central
- Rural District: Doab

Population (2006)
  - Total: 98
- Time zone: UTC+3:30 (IRST)
  - Summer (DST): UTC+4:30 (IRDT)

Mohammad Tip (Persian: محمدتيپ, also Romanized as Moḩammad Tip, Moḩammad Tīb, and Moḩammad Tib) is a village in Doab Rural District, in the Central District of Selseleh County, Lorestan Province, Iran. At the 2006 census, its population was 98, in 19 families.
