= Sowl Marjan =

Sowl Marjan سول مرجان
- Village
- Location within Iran
- Coordinates: 33°41′53″N 48°10′55″E
- Country: Iran
- Province: Lorestan
- County: Selseleh
- Bakhsh: Central
- Rural District: Honam

Population (2006)
  - Total: 93
- Time zone: UTC+3:30 (IRST)
  - Summer (DST): UTC+4:30 (IRDT)

Sowl Marjan (Persian: سول مرجان, also Romanized as Sowl Marjān and Sūl-e Marjān; also known as Sow‘el Barjeh) is a village in Honam Rural District, in the Central District of Selseleh County, Lorestan Province, Iran. At the 2006 census, its population was 93, in 19 families.
