= Davudabad, Tehran =

Village in Tehran province, Iran

Davudabad Persian: داوداباد
- Village
- Location within Iran
- Coordinates: 35°23′55″N 51°33′46″E
- Country: Iran
- Province: Tehran
- County: Qarchak
- District: Central
- Rural District: Valiabad

Population (2016)
  - Total: 6,399
- Time zone: UTC+3:30 (IRST)

Davudabad (Persian: داوداباد) (Note: Also romanized as Dāvūdābād) is a village in Valiabad Rural District of the Central District in Qarchak County, Tehran province, Iran.

== Demographics ==
=== Population ===
At the time of the 2006 National Census, the village's population was 7,435 in 1,753 households, when it was in the former Qarchak District of Varamin County. The following census in 2011 counted 7,323 people in 1,911 households. The 2016 census measured the population of the village as 6,399 people in 1,846 households, by which time the district had been separated from the county in the establishment of Qarchak County. The rural district was transferred to the new Central District. It was the most populous village in its rural district.
