= Qeshlaq-e Mashhadi Mohammad =

Village in Tehran province, Iran

Qeshlaq-e Mashhadi Mohammad Persian: قشلاق مشهدي محمد
- Village
- Location within Iran
- Coordinates: 35°23′49″N 51°34′39″E
- Country: Iran
- Province: Tehran
- County: Qarchak
- District: Central
- Rural District: Valiabad

Population (2016)
  - Total: 6,177
- Time zone: UTC+3:30 (IRST)

Qeshlaq-e Mashhadi Mohammad (Persian: قشلاق مشهدي محمد) (Note: Also romanized as Qeshlāq-e Mashhadī Moḥammad) is a village in Valiabad Rural District of the Central District in Qarchak County, Tehran province, Iran.

== Demographics ==
=== Population ===
At the time of the 2006 National Census, the village's population was 6,923 in 1,569 households, when it was in the former Qarchak District of Varamin County. The following census in 2011 counted 7,108 people in 1,828 households. The 2016 census measured the population of the village as 6,177 people in 1,726 households, by which time the district had been separated from the county in the establishment of Qarchak County. The rural district was transferred to the new Central District.
