= Karamjanabad =

Karamjanabad كرم جان اباد
- Village
- Location within Iran
- Coordinates: 33°49′53″N 48°13′19″E
- Country: Iran
- Province: Lorestan
- County: Selseleh
- Bakhsh: Central
- Rural District: Doab

Population (2006)
  - Total: 83
- Time zone: UTC+3:30 (IRST)
  - Summer (DST): UTC+4:30 (IRDT)

Karamjanabad (Persian: كرم جان اباد, also Romanized as Karamjānābād) is a village in Doab Rural District, in the Central District of Selseleh County, Lorestan Province, Iran. At the 2006 census, its population was 83, in 16 families.
