= Tarhani-ye Sofla =

Tarhani-ye Sofla طرهاني سفلي
- Village
- Location within Iran
- Coordinates: 33°51′01″N 48°14′57″E
- Country: Iran
- Province: Lorestan
- County: Selseleh
- Bakhsh: Central
- Rural District: Qaleh-ye Mozaffari

Population (2006)
  - Total: 374
- Time zone: UTC+3:30 (IRST)
  - Summer (DST): UTC+4:30 (IRDT)

Tarhani-ye Sofla (Persian: طرهاني سفلي, also Romanized as Ţarḩānī-ye Soflá and Ţarhānī-ye Soflá; also known as Ţarhānī-ye Pā’īn) is a village in Qaleh-ye Mozaffari Rural District, in the Central District of Selseleh County, Lorestan Province, Iran. At the 2006 census, its population was 374, in 80 families.
