= Aminabad, Qarchak =

Village in Tehran province, Iran

Aminabad Persian: امين اباد
- Village
- Location within Iran
- Coordinates: 35°24′58″N 51°33′44″E
- Country: Iran
- Province: Tehran
- County: Qarchak
- District: Central
- Rural District: Valiabad

Population (2016)
  - Total: 1,153
- Time zone: UTC+3:30 (IRST)

Aminabad (Persian: امين اباد) (Note: Also romanized as Amīnābād; also known as Amīrābād) is a village in Valiabad Rural District of the Central District in Qarchak County, Tehran province, Iran.

== Demographics ==
=== Population ===
At the time of the 2006 National Census, the village's population was 1,182 in 276 households, when it was in the former Qarchak District of Varamin County. The following census in 2011 counted 1,086 people in 309 households. The 2016 census measured the population of the village as 1,153 people in 411 households, by which time the district had been separated from the county in the establishment of Qarchak County. The rural district was transferred to the new Central District.
