= Bid Qatar =

Bid Qatar or Bidqatar (Persian: بيدقطار) may refer to:

- Bid Qatar-e Bon Rud, Fars Province
- Bid Qatar-e Olya, Lorestan Province
- Bid Qatar-e Sofla, Lorestan Province
