= Chulan Deym =

Chulan Deym چولان ديم
- Village
- Location within Iran
- Coordinates: 33°42′27″N 48°24′00″E
- Country: Iran
- Province: Lorestan
- County: Selseleh
- Bakhsh: Central
- Rural District: Honam

Population (2006)
  - Total: 92
- Time zone: UTC+3:30 (IRST)
  - Summer (DST): UTC+4:30 (IRDT)

Chulan Deym (Persian: چولان ديم, also Romanized as Chūlān Deym) is a village in Honam Rural District, in the Central District of Selseleh County, Lorestan Province, Iran. At the 2006 census, its population was 92, in 24 families.
