= Kabud Ban =

Kabud Ban كبودبان
- Village
- Location within Iran
- Coordinates: 33°48′51″N 48°14′05″E
- Country: Iran
- Province: Lorestan
- County: Selseleh
- Bakhsh: Central
- Rural District: Doab

Population (2006)
  - Total: 69
- Time zone: UTC+3:30 (IRST)
  - Summer (DST): UTC+4:30 (IRDT)

Kabud Ban (Persian: كبودبان, also Romanized as Kabūd Bān, Kabūdbān; also known as Kabūdīān, Kabūdābād, and Kabūd Bād) is a village in Doab Rural District, in the Central District of Selseleh County, Lorestan Province, Iran. At the 2006 census, its population was 69, in 14 families.
