= Sarab-e Seyyed Ali =

Sarab-e Seyyed Ali سراب صيدعلي
- Village
- Location within Iran
- Coordinates: 33°47′03″N 48°12′13″E
- Country: Iran
- Province: Lorestan
- County: Selseleh
- Bakhsh: Central
- Rural District: Doab

Population (2006)
  - Total: 128
- Time zone: UTC+3:30 (IRST)
  - Summer (DST): UTC+4:30 (IRDT)

Sarab-e Seyyed Ali (Persian: سراب صيدعلي, also Romanized as Sarāb-e Seyyed ‘Alī and Sarab Seid Ali) is a village in Doab Rural District, in the Central District of Selseleh County, Lorestan Province, Iran. At the 2006 census, its population was 128, in 23 families.
