= Qeshlaq-e Jitu =

Village in Tehran province, Iran

Qeshlaq-e Jitu Persian: قشلاق جيتو
- Village
- Location within Iran
- Coordinates: 35°26′49″N 51°36′25″E
- Country: Iran
- Province: Tehran
- County: Qarchak
- District: Central
- Rural District: Qeshlaq-e Jitu

Population (2016)
  - Total: 7,909
- Time zone: UTC+3:30 (IRST)

Qeshlaq-e Jitu (Persian: قشلاق جيتو) (Note: Also romanized as Qeshlāq-e Jītū; also known as Qeshlāq Jūtū and Qeshlāq-e Jūtū) is a village in, and the capital of, Qeshlaq-e Jitu Rural District in the Central District of Qarchak County, Tehran province, Iran.

== Demographics ==
=== Population ===
At the time of the 2006 National Census, the village's population was 7,346 in 1,689 households, when it was in the former Qarchak District of Varamin County. The following census in 2011 counted 6,893 people in 1,804 households. The 2016 census measured the population of the village as 7,909 people in 2,173 households, by which time the district had been separated from the county in the establishment of Qarchak County. The rural district was transferred to the new Central District. It was the most populous village in its rural district.
