= Mirzai-ye Ahangari =

Mirzai-ye Ahangari ميرزايي اهنگري
- Village
- Location within Iran
- Coordinates: 33°49′21″N 48°12′09″E
- Country: Iran
- Province: Lorestan
- County: Selseleh
- Bakhsh: Central
- Rural District: Doab

Population (2006)
  - Total: 143
- Time zone: UTC+3:30 (IRST)
  - Summer (DST): UTC+4:30 (IRDT)

Mirzai-ye Ahangari (Persian: ميرزايي اهنگري, also Romanized as Mīrzā'ī-ye Ahangarī) is a village in Doab Rural District, in the Central District of Selseleh County, Lorestan Province, Iran. At the 2006 census, its population was 143, in 24 families.
