= Chaghal Kan =

Chaghal Kan چيالكان
- Village
- Location within Iran
- Coordinates: 33°49′50″N 48°14′19″E
- Country: Iran
- Province: Lorestan
- County: Selseleh
- Bakhsh: Central
- Rural District: Doab

Population (2006)
  - Total: 122
- Time zone: UTC+3:30 (IRST)
  - Summer (DST): UTC+4:30 (IRDT)

Chaghal Kan (Persian: چيالكان, also Romanized as Chaghāl Kān; also known as Cheqālakān, Cheyālakān, and Chīālekān) is a village in Doab Rural District, in the Central District of Selseleh County, Lorestan Province, Iran. At the 2006 census, its population was 122, in 20 families.
