= Qeshlaq-e Mashhadi Abu ol Hasan =

Village in Tehran province, Iran

Qeshlaq-e Mashhadi Abu ol Hasan Persian: قشلاق مشهدي ابوالحسن
- Village
- Location within Iran
- Coordinates: 35°23′59″N 51°34′32″E
- Country: Iran
- Province: Tehran
- County: Qarchak
- District: Central
- Rural District: Valiabad

Population (2016)
  - Total: 3,603
- Time zone: UTC+3:30 (IRST)

Qeshlaq-e Mashhadi Abu ol Hasan (Persian: قشلاق مشهدي ابوالحسن) (Note: Also romanized as Qeshlāq-e Mashhahdī Ābū ol Hasan) is a village in Valiabad Rural District of the Central District in Qarchak County, Tehran province, Iran.

== Demographics ==
=== Population ===
At the time of the 2006 National Census, the village's population was 3,156 in 711 households, when it was in the former Qarchak District of Varamin County. The following census in 2011 counted 3,262 people in 852 households. The 2016 census measured the population of the village as 3,603 people in 1,001 households, by which time the district had been separated from the county in the establishment of Qarchak County. The rural district was transferred to the new Central District.
