= Cheshmeh Sardeh-ye Olya =

Cheshmeh Sardeh-ye Olya چشمه سرده عليا
- Village
- Location within Iran
- Coordinates: 33°45′13″N 48°13′57″E
- Country: Iran
- Province: Lorestan
- County: Selseleh
- Bakhsh: Central
- Rural District: Honam

Population (2006)
  - Total: 134
- Time zone: UTC+3:30 (IRST)
  - Summer (DST): UTC+4:30 (IRDT)

Cheshmeh Sardeh-ye Olya (Persian: چشمه سرده عليا, also Romanized as Cheshmeh Sardeh-ye 'Olyā and Cheshmeh Sardeh-e 'Olyā; also known as Cheshmeh Sardeh) is a village in Honam Rural District, in the Central District of Selseleh County, Lorestan province, Iran. At the 2006 census, its population was 134, in 32 families.
