= Eyvandar =

Eyvandar ایوان در
- Village
- Location within Iran
- Coordinates: 33°42′44″N 48°14′18″E
- Country: Iran
- Province: Lorestan
- County: Selseleh
- Bakhsh: Central
- Rural District: Honam

Population (2006)
  - Total: 102
- Time zone: UTC+3:30 (IRST)
  - Summer (DST): UTC+4:30 (IRDT)

Eyvandar (Persian: ایوان در, also Romanized as Eyvāndar; also known as Eyvān Darreh) is a village in Honam Rural District, in the Central District of Selseleh County, Lorestan Province, Iran. At the 2006 census, its population was 102, in 17 families.
