= Varnamad =

Varnamad ورنمد
- Village
- Location within Iran
- Coordinates: 33°44′18″N 48°08′50″E
- Country: Iran
- Province: Lorestan
- County: Selseleh
- Bakhsh: Central
- Rural District: Honam

Population (2006)
  - Total: 124
- Time zone: UTC+3:30 (IRST)
  - Summer (DST): UTC+4:30 (IRDT)

Varnamad (Persian: ورنمد, also Romanized as Varnemad and Varne‘mat; also known as Varnamad-e Soflá) is a village in Honam Rural District, in the Central District of Selseleh County, Lorestan Province, Iran. At the 2006 census, its population was 124, in 30 families.
