= Raziabad, Qarchak =

Village in Tehran province, Iran

Raziabad Persian: رضي اباد
- Village
- Location within Iran
- Coordinates: 35°22′50″N 51°31′45″E
- Country: Iran
- Province: Tehran
- County: Qarchak
- District: Central
- Rural District: Valiabad

Population (2016)
  - Total: 50
- Time zone: UTC+3:30 (IRST)

Raziabad (Persian: رضي اباد) (Note: Also romanized as Raẕīābād) is a village in Valiabad Rural District of the Central District in Qarchak County, Tehran province, Iran.

== Demographics ==
=== Population ===
The village did not appear in the 2006 National Census, when it was in the former Qarchak District of Varamin County. The following census in 2011 counted 17 people in four households. The 2016 census measured the population of the village as 50 people in 24 households, by which time the district had been separated from the county in the establishment of Qarchak County. The rural district was transferred to the new Central District.
