= Naservand =

Naservand (Persian: ناصروند) may refer to various villages in Iran:

- Naservand, Khorramabad
- Naservand, Selseleh
- Naservand-e Rahimi
