= Siah Dul-e Olya =

Siah Dul-e Olya سياهدول عليا
- Village
- Location within Iran
- Coordinates: 33°50′58″N 48°17′27″E
- Country: Iran
- Province: Lorestan
- County: Selseleh
- Bakhsh: Central
- Rural District: Qaleh-ye Mozaffari

Population (2006)
  - Total: 68
- Time zone: UTC+3:30 (IRST)
  - Summer (DST): UTC+4:30 (IRDT)

Siah Dul-e Olya (Persian: سياهدول عليا, also Romanized as Sīāh Dūl-e ‘Olyā) is a village in Qaleh-ye Mozaffari Rural District, in the Central District of Selseleh County, Lorestan Province, Iran. At the 2006 census, its population was 68, in 15 families.
