= Behdaq =

Behdaq بهداق
- Village
- Location within Iran
- Coordinates: 33°47′37″N 48°15′10″E
- Country: Iran
- Province: Lorestan
- County: Selseleh
- Bakhsh: Central
- Rural District: Honam

Population (2006)
  - Total: 211
- Time zone: UTC+3:30 (IRST)
  - Summer (DST): UTC+4:30 (IRDT)

Behdaq (Persian: بهداق, also Romanized as Behdāq; also known as Nūr Alahī, Nūrallāhī, and Nūr Ilāhi) is a village in Honam Rural District, in the Central District of Selseleh County, Lorestan Province, Iran. At the 2006 census, its population was 211, in 42 families.
