= Mohammadhasanvand =

Mohammadhasanvand محمدحسنوند
- Village
- Country: Iran
- Province: Lorestan
- County: Selseleh
- Bakhsh: Central
- Rural District: Honam

Population (2006)
  - Total: 21
- Time zone: UTC+3:30 (IRST)
  - Summer (DST): UTC+4:30 (IRDT)

Mohammadhasanvand (Persian: محمدحسنوند, also Romanized as Moḥammadḥasanvand) is a village in Honam Rural District, in the Central District of Selseleh County, Lorestan Province, Iran. At the 2006 census, its population was 21, in 5 families.
