= Kakareza =

Kakareza (Persian: كاكارضا) may refer to:

- Kakareza-ye Amid Ali
- Kakareza-ye Olya
- Kakareza-ye Sofla
- Kakareza-ye Vosta
