= Solhabad =

Solhabad (Persian: صلح اباد) may refer to:

- Solhabad, Bajestan, in Razavi Khorasan Province
- Solhabad, Semnan
- Solhabad, alternate name of Salehabadu, in Semnan Province

== See also ==
- Salehabad (disambiguation)
