= Darmahi =

Village in Lorestan province, Iran

Darmahi Persian: دارماهي
- Village
- Location within Iran
- Coordinates: 33°41′33″N 48°09′59″E
- Country: Iran
- Province: Lorestan
- County: Selseleh
- District: Central
- Rural District: Honam

Population (2016)
  - Total: 277
- Time zone: UTC+3:30 (IRST)

Darmahi (Persian: دارماهي) (Note: Also romanized as Dārmāhī; also known as Dārmū‘ī) is a village in Honam Rural District (Note: Formerly Selseleh Rural District) of the Central District in Selseleh County, Lorestan province, Iran.

== Demographics ==
=== Population ===
At the time of the 2006 National Census, the village's population was 302 in 72 households. The following census in 2011 counted 288 people in 72 households. The 2016 census measured the population of the village as 277 people in 84 households.
