= Kordabad-e Olya =

Kordabad-e Olya كردابادعليا
- Village
- Location within Iran
- Coordinates: 33°51′00″N 48°12′00″E
- Country: Iran
- Province: Lorestan
- County: Selseleh
- Bakhsh: Central
- Rural District: Yusefvand

Population (2006)
  - Total: 49
- Time zone: UTC+3:30 (IRST)
  - Summer (DST): UTC+4:30 (IRDT)

Kordabad-e Olya (Persian: كردابادعليا, also Romanized as Kordābād-e ‘Olyā) is a village in Yusefvand Rural District, in the Central District of Selseleh County, Lorestan Province, Iran. At the 2006 census, its population was 49, in 9 families.
