= Aliabad-e Javanmard =

Village in Lorestan province, Iran

Aliabad-e Javanmard Persian: علي ابادجوانمرد
- Village
- Location within Iran
- Coordinates: 33°51′55″N 48°19′17″E
- Country: Iran
- Province: Lorestan
- County: Selseleh
- District: Central
- Rural District: Qaleh-ye Mozaffari

Population (2016)
  - Total: 510
- Time zone: UTC+3:30 (IRST)

Aliabad-e Javanmard (Persian: علي ابادجوانمرد) (Note: Also romanized as ʿAlīābād-e Javānmard) is a village in Qaleh-ye Mozaffari Rural District of the Central District in Selseleh County, Lorestan province, Iran.

== Demographics ==
=== Population ===
At the time of the 2006 National Census, the village's population was 689 in 142 households. The following census in 2011 counted 400 people in 104 households. The 2016 census measured the population of the village as 510 people in 144 households.
