= Amir-e Pain =

Village in Lorestan province, Iran

Amir-e Pain Persian: امير پايين
- Village
- Location within Iran
- Coordinates: 33°53′01″N 48°15′33″E
- Country: Iran
- Province: Lorestan
- County: Selseleh
- District: Central
- Rural District: Qaleh-ye Mozaffari

Population (2016)
  - Total: 724
- Time zone: UTC+3:30 (IRST)

Amir-e Pain (Persian: امير پايين) (Note: Also romanized as Amīr-e Pā’īn; formerly known as Amir-e Sofla (اميرسفلي), also romanized as Amīr-e Soflá; also known as Amīr, Amīrī-ye Pā’īn, Sarāb-e Amīr, and Sarāb-i-Amīr) is a village in Qaleh-ye Mozaffari Rural District of the Central District in Selseleh County, Lorestan province, Iran.

== Demographics ==
=== Population ===
At the time of the 2006 National Census, the village's population, as Amir-e Sofla, was 773 in 165 households. The following census in 2011 counted 607 people in 157 households, by which time the village was listed as Amir-e Pain. The 2016 census measured the population of the village as 724 people in 203 households, the most populous in its rural district.
