= Abbasabad, Qaleh-ye Mozaffari =

Village in Lorestan province, Iran

Abbasabad Persian: عباس اباد
- Village
- Location within Iran
- Coordinates: 33°51′52″N 48°18′25″E
- Country: Iran
- Province: Lorestan
- County: Selseleh
- District: Central
- Rural District: Qaleh-ye Mozaffari

Population (2016)
  - Total: 267
- Time zone: UTC+3:30 (IRST)

Abbasabad (Persian: عباس اباد) (Note: Also romanized as ‘Abbāsābād) is a village in Qaleh-ye Mozaffari Rural District of the Central District in Selseleh County, Lorestan province, Iran.

== Demographics ==
=== Population ===
At the time of the 2006 National Census, the village's population was 318 in 59 households. The following census in 2011 counted 254 people in 64 households. The 2016 census measured the population of the village as 267 people in 75 households.
