= Cham Takleh-ye Olya =

Cham Takleh-ye Olya چمتكله عليا
- Village
- Location within Iran
- Coordinates: 33°44′03″N 48°05′25″E
- Country: Iran
- Province: Lorestan
- County: Selseleh
- Bakhsh: Central
- Rural District: Honam

Population (2006)
  - Total: 169
- Time zone: UTC+3:30 (IRST)
  - Summer (DST): UTC+4:30 (IRDT)

Cham Takleh-ye Olya (Persian: چمتكله عليا, also Romanized as Cham Takleh-ye 'Olyā and Cham Tagaleh-ye 'Olyā; also known as Cham Tagaleh and Cham Takleh) is a village in Honam Rural District, in the Central District of Selseleh County, Lorestan province, Iran. At the 2006 census, its population was 169, in 40 families.
