= Garkan =

Garkan (Persian: گركان) may refer to:

- Garkan-e Olya, Lorestan Province
- Garkan-e Sofla, Lorestan Province
- Garkan-e Jonubi District, in Isfahan Province
- Garkan Rural District, in Isfahan Province
- Garkan-e Shomali Rural District, in Isfahan Province
