= Cham Takleh =

Cham Takleh (Persian: چمتكله) may refer to:

- Cham Takleh-ye Olya
- Cham Takleh-ye Sofla
