= Chenareh-ye Olya =

Chenareh-ye Olya چناره عليا
- Village
- Location within Iran
- Coordinates: 33°54′17″N 48°13′02″E
- Country: Iran
- Province: Lorestan
- County: Selseleh
- Bakhsh: Central
- Rural District: Yusefvand

Population (2006)
  - Total: 222
- Time zone: UTC+3:30 (IRST)
  - Summer (DST): UTC+4:30 (IRDT)

Chenareh-ye Olya (Persian: چناره عليا, also Romanized as Chenāreh-ye 'Olyā; also known as Chenāreh-ye Bālā and Chenāreh) is a village in Yusefvand Rural District, in the Central District of Selseleh County, Lorestan province, Iran. At the 2006 census, its population was 222, in 49 families.
