= Alamabad, Lorestan =

Alamabad (Persian: علم اباد) in Lorestan may refer to:

- Alamabad, Dorud
- Alamabad, Selseleh
- Alamabad-e Sofla
