= Keshavarzeh =

Keshavarzeh (Persian: كشورزه) may refer to:

- Keshavarzeh-ye Olya
- Keshavarzeh-ye Sofla
