= Cheshmeh Barqi =

Village in Lorestan province, Iran

Cheshmeh Barqi Persian: چشمه برقي
- Village
- Location within Iran
- Coordinates: 33°51′54″N 48°16′56″E
- Country: Iran
- Province: Lorestan
- County: Selseleh
- District: Central
- Rural District: Qaleh-ye Mozaffari

Population (2016)
  - Total: 166
- Time zone: UTC+3:30 (IRST)

Cheshmeh Barqi (Persian: چشمه برقي) (Note: Also romanized as Cheshmeh Barqī; also known as ‘Alīābād-e Cheshmeh Barqī) is a village in, and the capital of, Qaleh-ye Mozaffari Rural District in the Central District of Selseleh County, Lorestan province, Iran.

== Demographics ==
=== Population ===
At the time of the 2006 National Census, the village's population was 92 in 19 households. The following census in 2011 counted 125 people in 33 households. The 2016 census measured the population of the village as 166 people in 45 households.
