= Hendi, Iran =

Village in Lorestan province, Iran

Hendi Persian: هندي
- Village
- Location within Iran
- Coordinates: 33°51′39″N 48°14′18″E
- Country: Iran
- Province: Lorestan
- County: Selseleh
- District: Central
- Rural District: Doab

Population (2016)
  - Total: 393
- Time zone: UTC+3:30 (IRST)

Hendi (Persian: هندي) (Note: Also romanized as Hendī; also known as Ḩoseynābād-e Hendī) is a village in Doab Rural District of the Central District in Selseleh County, Lorestan province, Iran.

== Demographics ==
=== Population ===
At the time of the 2006 National Census, the village's population was 466 in 93 households. The following census in 2011 counted 442 people in 107 households. The 2016 census measured the population of the village as 393 people in 115 households.
