= Goriran =

Goriran (Persian: گريران) may refer to:

- Goriran-e Olya
- Goriran-e Sofla
