= Kazemabad, Selseleh =

Village in Lorestan province, Iran

Kazemabad Persian: كاظم اباد
- Village
- Location within Iran
- Coordinates: 33°51′45″N 48°11′06″E
- Country: Iran
- Province: Lorestan
- County: Selseleh
- District: Central
- Rural District: Doab

Population (2016)
  - Total: 163
- Time zone: UTC+3:30 (IRST)

Kazemabad (Persian: كاظم اباد) (Note: Also romanized as Kāz̧emābād) is a village in Doab Rural District of the Central District in Selseleh County, Lorestan province, Iran.

== Demographics ==
=== Population ===
At the time of the 2006 National Census, the village's population was 266 in 52 households. The following census in 2011 counted 212 people in 57 households. The 2016 census measured the population of the village as 163 people in 50 households.
