= Amir-e Bala =

Village in Lorestan province, Iran

Amir-e Bala Persian: امير بالا
- Village
- Location within Iran
- Coordinates: 33°52′59″N 48°15′45″E
- Country: Iran
- Province: Lorestan
- County: Selseleh
- District: Central
- Rural District: Qaleh-ye Mozaffari

Population (2016)
  - Total: 686
- Time zone: UTC+3:30 (IRST)

Amir-e Bala (Persian: امير بالا) (Note: Also romanized as Amīr-e Bālā; formerly known as Amir-e Olya (اميرعليا), also romanized as Amīr-e ‘Olyā) is a village in Qaleh-ye Mozaffari Rural District of the Central District in Selseleh County, Lorestan province, Iran.

== Demographics ==
=== Population ===
At the time of the 2006 National Census, the village's population, as Amir-e Olya, was 637 in 139 households. The following census in 2011 counted 808 people in 200 households, by which time the village was listed as Amir-e Bala. The 2016 census measured the population of the village as 686 people in 203 households.
