= Sarab Chenar =

Sarab Chenar (Persian: سراب چنار) may refer to:

- Sarab Chenar-e Olya
- Sarab Chenar-e Sofla
