= Mian Volan-e Sofla =

Mian Volan-e Sofla ميان ولان سفلي
- Village
- Location within Iran
- Coordinates: 33°50′20″N 48°14′24″E
- Country: Iran
- Province: Lorestan
- County: Selseleh
- Bakhsh: Central
- Rural District: Doab

Population (2006)
  - Total: 16
- Time zone: UTC+3:30 (IRST)
  - Summer (DST): UTC+4:30 (IRDT)

Mian Volan-e Sofla (Persian: ميان ولان سفلي, also Romanized as Mīān Volān-e Soflá and Mīānvolān-e Soflá) is a village in Doab Rural District, in the Central District of Selseleh County, Lorestan Province, Iran. At the 2006 census, its population was 16, in 4 families.
