= Sarab Sorkheh Ahmadabad =

Village in Lorestan province, Iran

Sarab Sorkheh Ahmadabad Persian: سراب سرخه احمداباد
- Village
- Location within Iran
- Coordinates: 33°52′12″N 48°16′43″E
- Country: Iran
- Province: Lorestan
- County: Selseleh
- District: Central
- Rural District: Qaleh-ye Mozaffari

Population (2016)
  - Total: 235
- Time zone: UTC+3:30 (IRST)

Sarab Sorkheh Ahmadabad (Persian: سراب سرخه احمداباد) (Note: Also romanized as Sarāb Sorkheh Aḩmadābād; also known as Aḩmadābād) is a village in Qaleh-ye Mozaffari Rural District of the Central District in Selseleh County, Lorestan province, Iran.

== Demographics ==
=== Population ===
At the time of the 2006 National Census, the village's population was 264 in 55 households. The following census in 2011 counted 268 people in 62 households. The 2016 census measured the population of the village as 235 people in 72 households.
