= Mowmenabad, Selseleh =

Village in Lorestan province, Iran

Mowmenabad Persian: مؤمن‌آباد
- Village
- Location within Iran
- Coordinates: 33°50′06″N 48°13′19″E
- Country: Iran
- Province: Lorestan
- County: Selseleh
- District: Central
- Rural District: Doab

Population (2016)
  - Total: 406
- Time zone: UTC+3:30 (IRST)

Mowmenabad (Persian: مؤمن‌آباد) (Note: Also romanized as Mowmenābād; also known as Mīman, Mo‘menābād, and Mow‘men) is a village in, and the capital of, Doab Rural District in the Central District of Selseleh County, Lorestan province, Iran.

== Demographics ==
=== Population ===
At the time of the 2006 National Census, the village's population was 398 in 79 households. The following census in 2011 counted 392 people in 101 households. The 2016 census measured the population of the village as 406 people in 119 households, the most populous in its rural district.
