= Rezaabad, Doab =

Village in Lorestan province, Iran

Rezaabad Persian: رضااباد
- Village
- Location within Iran
- Coordinates: 33°54′03″N 48°09′19″E
- Country: Iran
- Province: Lorestan
- County: Selseleh
- District: Central
- Rural District: Doab

Population (2016)
  - Total: 229
- Time zone: UTC+3:30 (IRST)

Rezaabad (Persian: رضااباد) (Note: Also romanized as Reẕāābād) is a village in Doab Rural District of the Central District in Selseleh County, Lorestan province, Iran.

== Demographics ==
=== Population ===
At the time of the 2006 National Census, the village's population was 248 in 55 households. The following census in 2011 counted 231 people in 61 households. The 2016 census measured the population of the village as 229 people in 69 households.
