= Keshavarzeh-ye Olya =

Keshavarzeh-ye Olya كشورزه عليا
- Village
- Location within Iran
- Coordinates: 33°44′08″N 48°24′19″E
- Country: Iran
- Province: Lorestan
- County: Selseleh
- Bakhsh: Central
- Rural District: Honam

Population (2006)
  - Total: 154
- Time zone: UTC+3:30 (IRST)
  - Summer (DST): UTC+4:30 (IRDT)

Keshavarzeh-ye Olya (Persian: كشورزه عليا, also Romanized as Keshavarzeh-ye ‘Olyā) is a village in Honam Rural District, in the Central District of Selseleh County, Lorestan Province, Iran. At the 2006 census, its population was 154, in 33 families.
