= Shahpurabad (disambiguation) =

Shahpurabad is a city in Isfahan Province, Iran.

Shahpurabad (Persian: شاهپورآباد) may also refer to:

- Shahpurabad Industrial Area, Isfahan Province
- Shahpurabad, Kermanshah
- Shahpurabad, Aligudarz, Lorestan Province
- Shahpurabad, Selseleh, Lorestan Province
