= Alqasabad =

Village in Lorestan province, Iran

Alqasabad Persian: القاس اباد
- Village
- Location within Iran
- Coordinates: 33°49′32″N 48°15′47″E
- Country: Iran
- Province: Lorestan
- County: Selseleh
- District: Central
- Rural District: Qaleh-ye Mozaffari

Population (2016)
  - Total: 235
- Time zone: UTC+3:30 (IRST)

Alqasabad (Persian: القاس اباد) (Note: Also romanized as Alqāsābād and Alqāşābād) is a village in Qaleh-ye Mozaffari Rural District of the Central District in Selseleh County, Lorestan province, Iran.

== Demographics ==
=== Population ===
At the time of the 2006 National Census, the village's population was 252 in 50 households. The following census in 2011 counted 281 people in 75 households. The 2016 census measured the population of the village as 235 people in 65 households.
