= Feyzabad, Lorestan =

Village in Lorestan province, Iran

Feyzabad Persian: فيض اباد
- Village
- Location within Iran
- Coordinates: 33°50′08″N 48°11′49″E
- Country: Iran
- Province: Lorestan
- County: Selseleh
- District: Central
- Rural District: Doab

Population (2016)
  - Total: 212
- Time zone: UTC+3:30 (IRST)

Feyzabad (Persian: فيض اباد) (Note: Also romanized as Feyẕābād and Feyzābād; also known as Faizābād) is a village in Doab Rural District of the Central District in Selseleh County, Lorestan province, Iran.

== Demographics ==
=== Population ===
At the time of the 2006 National Census, the village's population was 271 in 54 households. The following census in 2011 counted 239 people in 59 households. The 2016 census measured the population of the village as 212 people in 62 households.
