= Deh-e Rahm =

Village in Lorestan province, Iran

Deh-e Rahm Persian: ده رحم
- Village
- Location within Iran
- Coordinates: 33°52′26″N 48°12′37″E
- Country: Iran
- Province: Lorestan
- County: Selseleh
- District: Central
- Rural District: Yusefvand

Population (2016)
  - Total: 435
- Time zone: UTC+3:30 (IRST)

Deh-e Rahm (Persian: ده رحم) (Note: Also romanized as Deh-e Raḩm; also known as Deh Raḩīm) is a village in, and the capital of, Yusefvand Rural District (Note: Formerly Aleshtar Rural District) in the Central District of Selseleh County, Lorestan province, Iran.

== Demographics ==
=== Population ===
At the time of the 2006 National Census, the village's population was 475 in 97 households. The following census in 2011 counted 485 people in 120 households. The 2016 census measured the population of the village as 435 people in 115 households.
