= Jamshidabad, Qaleh-ye Mozaffari =

Jamshidabad جمشيدآباد
- Village
- Location within Iran
- Coordinates: 33°51′55″N 48°17′59″E
- Country: Iran
- Province: Lorestan
- County: Selseleh
- Bakhsh: Central
- Rural District: Qaleh-ye Mozaffari

Population (2006)
  - Total: 21
- Time zone: UTC+3:30 (IRST)
  - Summer (DST): UTC+4:30 (IRDT)

Jamshidabad (Persian: جمشيدآباد, also Romanized as Jamshīdābād) is a village in Qaleh-ye Mozaffari Rural District, in the Central District of Selseleh County, Lorestan Province, Iran. At the 2006 census, its population was 21, in 4 families.
