= Jamshidabad, Yusefvand =

Jamshidabad جمشيداباد
- Village
- Location within Iran
- Coordinates: 33°53′55″N 48°14′15″E
- Country: Iran
- Province: Lorestan
- County: Selseleh
- Bakhsh: Central
- Rural District: Yusefvand

Population (2006)
  - Total: 100
- Time zone: UTC+3:30 (IRST)
  - Summer (DST): UTC+4:30 (IRDT)

Jamshidabad (Persian: جمشيداباد, also Romanized as Jamshīdābād; also known as Jamshīdābād-e Gorīrān) is a village in Yusefvand Rural District, in the Central District of Selseleh County, Lorestan Province, Iran. At the 2006 census, its population was 100, in 22 families.
