= Kakareza-ye Amid Ali =

Kakareza-ye Amid Ali كاكارضااميدعلي
- Village
- Location within Iran
- Coordinates: 33°43′18″N 48°15′18″E
- Country: Iran
- Province: Lorestan
- County: Selseleh
- Bakhsh: Central
- Rural District: Honam

Population (2006)
  - Total: 86
- Time zone: UTC+3:30 (IRST)
  - Summer (DST): UTC+4:30 (IRDT)

Kakareza-ye Amid Ali (Persian: كاكارضااميدعلي, also Romanized as Kākāreẕā-ye Āmīd ʿAlī; also known as Kākāreẕā-ye Markazī and Shahrak-e Kākā Reẕā) is a village in Honam Rural District, in the Central District of Selseleh County, Lorestan Province, Iran. At the 2006 census, its population was 86, in 15 families.
