= Khosrowabad-e Paresk =

Village in Lorestan province, Iran

Khosrowabad-e Paresk Persian: خسرو آباد پرسک
- Village
- Location within Iran
- Coordinates: 33°47′21″N 48°16′11″E
- Country: Iran
- Province: Lorestan
- County: Selseleh
- District: Central
- Rural District: Honam

Population (2016)
  - Total: 280
- Time zone: UTC+3:30 (IRST)

Khosrowabad-e Paresk (Persian: خسرو آباد پرسک) (Note: Also romanized as Khosrowābād-e Paresk; formerly known as Khosrowabad (خسرواباد), also romanized as Khosrowābād) is a village in Honam Rural District (Note: Formerly Selseleh Rural District) of the Central District in Selseleh County, Lorestan province, Iran.

== Demographics ==
=== Population ===
At the time of the 2006 National Census, the village's population, as Khosrowabad, was 373 in 70 households. The following census in 2011 counted 410 people in 106 households, by which time the village was listed as Khosrowabad-e Paresk. The 2016 census measured the population of the village as 280 people in 85 households.
