= Cham Takleh-ye Sofla =

Cham Takleh-ye Sofla چمتكله سفلي
- Village
- Country: Iran
- Province: Lorestan
- County: Selseleh
- Bakhsh: Central
- Rural District: Honam

Population (2006)
  - Total: 49
- Time zone: UTC+3:30 (IRST)
  - Summer (DST): UTC+4:30 (IRDT)

Cham Takleh-ye Sofla (Persian: چمتكله سفلي, also Romanized as Cham Takleh-ye Soflá) is a village in Honam Rural District, in the Central District of Selseleh County, Lorestan Province, Iran. At the 2006 census, its population was 49, in 13 families.
