= Sarab-e Honam =

Village in Lorestan province, Iran

Sarab-e Honam Persian: سراب هنام
- Village
- Location within Iran
- Coordinates: 33°48′26″N 48°18′48″E
- Country: Iran
- Province: Lorestan
- County: Selseleh
- District: Central
- Rural District: Honam

Population (2016)
  - Total: 232
- Time zone: UTC+3:30 (IRST)

Sarab-e Honam (Persian: سراب هنام) (Note: Also romanized as Sarāb-e Honām and Sarāb-e Honnām; also known as Sarāb Honom and Sarāb-e Honom) is a village in Honam Rural District (Note: Formerly Selseleh Rural District) of the Central District in Selseleh County, Lorestan province, Iran.

== Demographics ==
=== Population ===
At the time of the 2006 National Census, the village's population was 221 in 52 households. The following census in 2011 counted 222 people in 55 households. The 2016 census measured the population of the village as 232 people in 67 households.
