= Paresk =

Village in Lorestan province, Iran

Paresk Persian: پرسك
- Village
- Location within Iran
- Coordinates: 33°48′56″N 48°21′18″E
- Country: Iran
- Province: Lorestan
- County: Selseleh
- District: Central
- Rural District: Honam

Population (2016)
  - Total: 378
- Time zone: UTC+3:30 (IRST)

Paresk (Persian: پرسك) (Note: Also known as Parāsh, Paresg, and Paresk-e Soflá) is a village in Honam Rural District (Note: Formerly Selseleh Rural District) of the Central District in Selseleh County, Lorestan province, Iran.

== Demographics ==
=== Population ===
At the time of the 2006 National Census, the village's population was 436 in 90 households. The following census in 2011 counted 282 people in 73 households. The 2016 census measured the population of the village as 378 people in 108 households.
