= Raziabad, Lorestan =

Village in Lorestan province, Iran

Raziabad Persian: رضي اباد
- Village
- Location within Iran
- Coordinates: 33°51′55″N 48°18′51″E
- Country: Iran
- Province: Lorestan
- County: Selseleh
- District: Central
- Rural District: Qaleh-ye Mozaffari

Population (2016)
  - Total: 317
- Time zone: UTC+3:30 (IRST)

Raziabad (Persian: رضي اباد) (Note: Also romanized as Raẕīābād and Razīābād) is a village in Qaleh-ye Mozaffari Rural District of the Central District in Selseleh County, Lorestan province, Iran.

== Demographics ==
=== Population ===
At the time of the 2006 National Census, the village's population was 190 in 36 households. The following census in 2011 counted 405 people in 105 households. The 2016 census measured the population of the village as 317 people in 87 households.
