= Ahangaran, Selseleh =

Village in Lorestan province, Iran

Ahangaran Persian: اهنگران
- Village
- Location within Iran
- Coordinates: 33°49′35″N 48°13′50″E
- Country: Iran
- Province: Lorestan
- County: Selseleh
- District: Central
- Rural District: Doab

Population (2016)
  - Total: 246
- Time zone: UTC+3:30 (IRST)

Ahangaran (Persian: اهنگران) (Note: Also romanized as Āhangarān; also known as Āhangarān-e Soflá and Āhangirān) is a village in Doab Rural District of the Central District in Selseleh County, Lorestan province, Iran.

== Demographics ==
=== Population ===
At the time of the 2006 National Census, the village's population was 365 in 67 households. The following census in 2011 counted 303 people in 68 households. The 2016 census measured the population of the village as 246 people in 73 households.
