= Mian Volan-e Vosta =

Mian Volan-e Vosta ميان ولان وسطي
- Village
- Location within Iran
- Coordinates: 33°50′39″N 48°14′29″E
- Country: Iran
- Province: Lorestan
- County: Selseleh
- Bakhsh: Central
- Rural District: Doab

Population (2006)
  - Total: 44
- Time zone: UTC+3:30 (IRST)
  - Summer (DST): UTC+4:30 (IRDT)

Mian Volan-e Vosta (Persian: ميان ولان وسطي, also Romanized as Mīān Volān-e Vosţá) is a village in Doab Rural District, in the Central District of Selseleh County, Lorestan Province, Iran. At the 2006 census, its population was 44, in 9 families.
