= Kakareza-ye Vosta =

Kakareza-ye Vosta كاكارضاوسطي
- Village
- Location within Iran
- Coordinates: 33°43′19″N 48°15′44″E
- Country: Iran
- Province: Lorestan
- County: Selseleh
- Bakhsh: Central
- Rural District: Honam

Population (2006)
  - Total: 30
- Time zone: UTC+3:30 (IRST)
  - Summer (DST): UTC+4:30 (IRDT)

Kakareza-ye Vosta (Persian: كاكارضاوسطي, also Romanized as Kākāreẕā-ye Vosţá) is a village in Honam Rural District, in the Central District of Selseleh County, Lorestan Province, Iran. At the 2006 census, its population was 30, in 6 families.
