= Chenareh-ye Sofla =

Village in Lorestan, Iran

Chenareh-ye Sofla چناره سفلي
- Village
- Location within Iran
- Coordinates: 33°54′10″N 48°13′04″E
- Country: Iran
- Province: Lorestan
- County: Selseleh
- Bakhsh: Central
- Rural District: Yusefvand

Population (2006)
  - Total: 60
- Time zone: UTC+3:30 (IRST)
  - Summer (DST): UTC+4:30 (IRDT)

Chenareh-ye Sofla (Persian: چناره سفلي, also Romanized as Chenāreh-ye Soflá) is a village in Yusefvand Rural District, in the Central District of Selseleh County, Lorestan Province, Iran. At the time of the 2006 census, its population was 60, in 15 families.
