= Nurabad-e Cheshmeh Barqi =

Village in Lorestan province, Iran

Nurabad-e Cheshmeh Barqi Persian: نورابادچشمه برقي
- Village
- Location within Iran
- Coordinates: 33°52′03″N 48°17′02″E
- Country: Iran
- Province: Lorestan
- County: Selseleh
- District: Central
- Rural District: Qaleh-ye Mozaffari

Population (2016)
  - Total: 351
- Time zone: UTC+3:30 (IRST)

Nurabad-e Cheshmeh Barqi (Persian: نورابادچشمه برقي) (Note: Also romanized as Nūrābād-e Cheshmeh Barqī) is a village in Qaleh-ye Mozaffari Rural District of the Central District in Selseleh County, Lorestan province, Iran.

== Demographics ==
=== Population ===
At the time of the 2006 National Census, the village's population was 405 in 79 households. The following census in 2011 counted 360 people in 93 households. The 2016 census measured the population of the village as 351 people in 102 households.
