= Salehabad, Qarchak =

Village in Tehran province, Iran

Salehabad Persian: صالح اباد
- Village
- Location within Iran
- Coordinates: 35°25′34″N 51°37′00″E
- Country: Iran
- Province: Tehran
- County: Qarchak
- District: Central
- Rural District: Qeshlaq-e Jitu

Population (2016)
  - Total: 3,715
- Time zone: UTC+3:30 (IRST)

Salehabad (Persian: صالح اباد) (Note: Also romanized as Şāleḩābād) is a village in Qeshlaq-e Jitu Rural District of the Central District in Qarchak County, Tehran province, Iran.

== Demographics ==
=== Population ===
At the time of the 2006 National Census, the village's population was 3,341 in 823 households, when it was in the former Qarchak District of Varamin County. The following census in 2011 counted 3,833 people in 1,040 households. The 2016 census measured the population of the village as 3,715 people in 1,068 households, by which time the district had been separated from the county in the establishment of Qarchak County. The rural district was transferred to the new Central District.
