= Sarab-e Saqqa =

Village in Lorestan province, Iran

Sarab-e Saqqa Persian: سرابسقا
- Village
- Location within Iran
- Coordinates: 33°42′25″N 48°09′01″E
- Country: Iran
- Province: Lorestan
- County: Selseleh
- District: Central
- Rural District: Honam

Population (2016)
  - Total: 435
- Time zone: UTC+3:30 (IRST)

Sarab-e Saqqa (Persian: سرابسقا) (Note: Also romanized as Sarāb-e Saqqā) is a village in Honam Rural District (Note: Formerly Selseleh Rural District) of the Central District in Selseleh County, Lorestan province, Iran.

== Demographics ==
=== Population ===
At the time of the 2006 National Census, the village's population was 456 in 107 households. The following census in 2011 counted 468 people in 126 households. The 2016 census measured the population of the village as 435 people in 120 households, the most populous in its rural district.
