= Dar Tang =

Dar Tang (Persian: درتنگ) may refer to:

- Dar Tang-e Olya
- Dar Tang-e Sofla
