= Kakareza-ye Sofla =

Kakareza-ye Sofla كاكارضاسفلي
- Village
- Location within Iran
- Coordinates: 33°43′45″N 48°16′11″E
- Country: Iran
- Province: Lorestan
- County: Selseleh
- Bakhsh: Central
- Rural District: Honam

Population (2006)
  - Total: 110
- Time zone: UTC+3:30 (IRST)
  - Summer (DST): UTC+4:30 (IRDT)

Kakareza-ye Sofla (Persian: كاكارضاسفلي, also Romanized as Kākāreẕā-ye Soflá) is a village in Honam Rural District, in the Central District of Selseleh County, Lorestan Province, Iran. At the 2006 census, its population was 110 people across 21 families.
