= Salehabad Amid Ali =

Salehabad Amid Ali صالح اباداميدعلي
- Village
- Location within Iran
- Coordinates: 33°53′46″N 48°12′49″E
- Country: Iran
- Province: Lorestan
- County: Selseleh
- Bakhsh: Central
- Rural District: Yusefvand

Population (2006)
  - Total: 174
- Time zone: UTC+3:30 (IRST)
  - Summer (DST): UTC+4:30 (IRDT)

Salehabad Amid Ali (Persian: صالح اباداميدعلي, also Romanized as Şāleḩābād Āmīd ʿAlī; also known as Şāleḩābād-e Soflá) is a village in Yusefvand Rural District, in the Central District of Selseleh County, Lorestan Province, Iran. At the 2006 census, its population was 174, in 34 families.
