= Dakamavand =

Dakamavand (Persian: دكاموند) may refer to:

- Dakamavand-e Olya
- Dakamavand-e Sofla
