= Keshavardeh-ye Sofla =

Keshavardeh-ye Sofla كشورده سفلي
- Village
- Location within Iran
- Coordinates: 33°43′36″N 48°24′20″E
- Country: Iran
- Province: Lorestan
- County: Selseleh
- Bakhsh: Central
- Rural District: Honam

Population (2006)
  - Total: 80
- Time zone: UTC+3:30 (IRST)
  - Summer (DST): UTC+4:30 (IRDT)

Keshavardeh-ye Sofla (Persian: كشورده سفلي, also Romanized as Keshavardeh-ye Soflá; also known as Keshavarzeh-ye Soflá) is a village in Honam Rural District, in the Central District of Selseleh County, Lorestan Province, Iran. At the 2006 census, its population was 80, in 18 families.
