= Sarab Chenar-e Bala =

Village in Lorestan province, Iran

Sarab Chenar-e Bala Persian: سراب چناربالا
- Village
- Location within Iran
- Coordinates: 33°41′50″N 48°09′20″E
- Country: Iran
- Province: Lorestan
- County: Selseleh
- District: Central
- Rural District: Honam

Population (2016)
  - Total: 263
- Time zone: UTC+3:30 (IRST)

Sarab Chenar-e Bala (Persian: سراب چناربالا) (Note: Also romanized as Sarāb Chenār-e Bālā; formerly known as Sarab Chenar-e Olya (سراب چنارعليا), also romanized as Sarāb Chenār-e ‘Olyā) is a village in Honam Rural District (Note: Formerly Selseleh Rural District) of the Central District in Selseleh County, Lorestan province, Iran.

== Demographics ==
=== Population ===
At the time of the 2006 National Census, the village's population, as Sarab Chenar-e Olya, was 207 in 50 households. The following census in 2011 counted 226 people in 66 households, by which time the village was listed as Sarab Chenar-e Bala. The 2016 census measured the population of the village as 263 people in 79 households.
