= Sarab-e Siyah Push =

Village in Lorestan province, Iran

Sarab-e Siyah Push Persian: سراب سياه پوش
- Village
- Location within Iran
- Coordinates: 33°48′27″N 48°14′15″E
- Country: Iran
- Province: Lorestan
- County: Selseleh
- District: Central
- Rural District: Honam

Population (2016)
  - Total: 200
- Time zone: UTC+3:30 (IRST)

Sarab-e Siyah Push (Persian: سراب سياه پوش) (Note: Also romanized as Sarab-e Seyah Push and Sarāb-e Seyāh Pūsh; also known as Sīāh Pūsh and Sīāhpūsh) is a village in, and the capital of, Honam Rural District (Note: Formerly Selseleh Rural District) in the Central District of Selseleh County, Lorestan province, Iran.

== Demographics ==
=== Population ===
At the time of the 2006 National Census, the village's population was 222 in 51 households. The following census in 2011 counted 198 people in 51 households. The 2016 census measured the population of the village as 200 people in 55 households.
