= Siah Push =

Siah Push or Siyah Push or Seyah Push or Siyapush or Siahpush (Persian: سياه پوش) may refer to:

- Siah Push, Ardabil
- Siah Push, Lorestan
- Siah Push, Qazvin

== See also ==
- Siah-Posh Kafirs
