= Dakamavand-e Pain =

Village in Lorestan province, Iran

Dakamavand-e Pain Persian: دکاموند پايين
- Village
- Location within Iran
- Country: Iran
- Province: Lorestan
- County: Selseleh
- District: Central
- Rural District: Yusefvand

Population (2016)
  - Total: 368
- Time zone: UTC+3:30 (IRST)

Dakamavand-e Pain (Persian: دکاموند پايين) (Note: Also romanized as Dakāmavand-e Pā’īn; formerly known as Dakamavand-e Sofla (دكاموندسفلي), also romanized as Dakāmavand-e Soflá) is a village in Yusefvand Rural District (Note: Formerly Aleshtar Rural District) of the Central District in Selseleh County, Lorestan province, Iran.

== Demographics ==
=== Population ===
At the time of the 2006 National Census, the village's population, as Dakamavand-e Sofla, was 277 in 64 households. The following census in 2011 counted 319 people in 79 households, by which time the village was listed as Dakamavand-e Pain. The 2016 census measured the population of the village as 368 people in 101 households.
