= Bid Qatar-e Bala =

Village in Lorestan province, Iran

Bid Qatar-e Bala Persian: بيد قطاربالا
- Village
- Location within Iran
- Coordinates: 33°44′00″N 48°09′18″E
- Country: Iran
- Province: Lorestan
- County: Selseleh
- District: Central
- Rural District: Honam

Population (2016)
  - Total: 38
- Time zone: UTC+3:30 (IRST)

Bid Qatar-e Bala (Persian: بيد قطاربالا) (Note: Also romanized as Bīd Qaţār-e Bālā; formerly known as Bid Qatar-e Olya (بيدقطارعليا), also romanized as Bīd Qaţār-e ‘Olyā; also known as Bīd Qaţār) is a village in Honam Rural District (Note: Formerly Selseleh Rural District) of the Central District in Selseleh County, Lorestan province, Iran.

== Demographics ==
=== Population ===
At the time of the 2006 National Census, the village's population, as Bid Qatar-e Olya, was 68 in 10 households. The following census in 2011 counted 52 people in 11 households, by which time the village was listed as Bid Qatar-e Bala. The 2016 census measured the population of the village as 38 people in 12 households.
