= Goriran-e Bala =

Village in Lorestan province, Iran

Goriran-e Bala Persian: گريران بالا
- Village
- Location within Iran
- Coordinates: 33°54′20″N 48°14′07″E
- Country: Iran
- Province: Lorestan
- County: Selseleh
- District: Central
- Rural District: Yusefvand

Population (2016)
  - Total: 250
- Time zone: UTC+3:30 (IRST)

Goriran-e Bala (Persian: گريران بالا) (Note: Also romanized as Gorīrān-e Bālā; formerly known as Goriran-e Olya (گريران عليا), also romanized as Gorīrān-e ‘Olyā) is a village in Yusefvand Rural District (Note: Formerly Aleshtar Rural District) of the Central District in Selseleh County, Lorestan province, Iran.

== Demographics ==
=== Population ===
At the time of the 2006 National Census, the village's population, as Goriran-e Olya, was 270 in 54 households. The following census in 2011 counted 256 people in 61 households, by which time the village was listed as Goriran-e Bala. The 2016 census measured the population of the village as 250 people in 68 households.
