= Sarab Chenar-e Sofla =

Village in Lorestan province, Iran

Sarab Chenar-e Sofla Persian: سراب چنارسفلي
- Village
- Location within Iran
- Coordinates: 33°41′45″N 48°09′34″E
- Country: Iran
- Province: Lorestan
- County: Selseleh
- District: Central
- Rural District: Honam

Population (2016)
  - Total: 215
- Time zone: UTC+3:30 (IRST)

Sarab Chenar-e Sofla (Persian: سراب چنارسفلي) (Note: Also romanized as Sarāb Chenār-e Soflá) is a village in Honam Rural District (Note: Formerly Selseleh Rural District) of the Central District in Selseleh County, Lorestan province, Iran.

== Demographics ==
=== Population ===
At the time of the 2006 National Census, the village's population was 219 in 51 households. The following census in 2011 counted 230 people in 55 households. The 2016 census measured the population of the village as 215 people in 59 households.
