= Alamabad-e Sofla =

Alamabad-e Sofla عالم ابادسفلي
- Village
- Location within Iran
- Coordinates: 33°50′36″N 48°11′42″E
- Country: Iran
- Province: Lorestan
- County: Selseleh
- Bakhsh: Central
- Rural District: Doab

Population (2006)
  - Total: 121
- Time zone: UTC+3:30 (IRST)
  - Summer (DST): UTC+4:30 (IRDT)

Alamabad-e Sofla (Persian: عالم ابادسفلي, also Romanized as ‘Ālamābād-e Soflá) is a village in Doab Rural District, in the Central District of Selseleh County, Lorestan Province, Iran. At the 2006 census, its population was 121, in 19 families.
