= Goriran-e Pain =

Village in Lorestan province, Iran

Goriran-e Pain Persian: گريران پايين
- Village
- Location within Iran
- Coordinates: 33°54′02″N 48°14′06″E
- Country: Iran
- Province: Lorestan
- County: Selseleh
- District: Central
- Rural District: Yusefvand

Population (2016)
  - Total: 385
  - Density: 359/km^{2} (930/sq mi)
- Time zone: UTC+3:30 (IRST)

Goriran-e Pain (Persian: گريران پايين) (Note: Also romanized as Gorīrān-e Pā’īn; formerly known as Goriran-e Sofla (گريران سفلي), also romanized as Gorīrān-e Soflá) is a village in Yusefvand Rural District (Note: Formerly Aleshtar Rural District) of the Central District in Selseleh County, Lorestan province, Iran.

== Demographics ==
=== Population ===
At the time of the 2006 National Census, the village's population, as Goriran-e Sofla, was 394 in 85 households. The following census in 2011 counted 368 people in 88 households, by which time the village was listed as Goriran-e Pain. The 2016 census measured the population of the village as 359 people in 96 households.
