= Dakamavand-e Bala =

Village in Lorestan province, Iran

Dakamavand-e Bala Persian: دکاموند بالا
- Village
- Location within Iran
- Coordinates: 33°54′50″N 48°16′48″E
- Country: Iran
- Province: Lorestan
- County: Selseleh
- District: Central
- Rural District: Yusefvand

Population (2016)
  - Total: 654
- Time zone: UTC+3:30 (IRST)

Dakamavand-e Bala (Persian: دکاموند بالا) (Note: Also romanized as Dakāmavand-e Bālā; formerly known as Dakamavand-e Olya (دكاموندعليا), also romanized as Dakāmavand-e 'Olyā; also known as Dakāmavand) is a village in Yusefvand Rural District (Note: Formerly Aleshtar Rural District) of the Central District in Selseleh County, Lorestan province, Iran.

== Demographics ==
=== Population ===
At the time of the 2006 National Census, the village's population, as Dakamavand-e Olya, was 778 in 158 households. The following census in 2011 counted 746 people in 172 households, by which time the village was listed as Dakamavand-e Bala. The 2016 census measured the population of the village as 654 people in 181 households.
