= Bid Qatar-e Pain =

Village in Lorestan province, Iran

Bid Qatar-e Pain Persian: بيد قطار پايين
- Village
- Location within Iran
- Coordinates: 33°44′23″N 48°09′31″E
- Country: Iran
- Province: Lorestan
- County: Selseleh
- District: Central
- Rural District: Honam

Population (2016)
  - Total: 217
- Time zone: UTC+3:30 (IRST)

Bid Qatar-e Pain (Persian: بيد قطار پايين) (Note: Also romanized as Bīd Qaţār-e Pā’īn and Bīdqaţār-e Pā’īn; formerly known as Bid Qatar-e Sofla (بيدقطارسفلي), also romanized as Bīd Qaţār-e Soflá) is a village in Honam Rural District (Note: Formerly Selseleh Rural District) of the Central District in Selseleh County, Lorestan province, Iran.

== Demographics ==
=== Population ===
At the time of the 2006 National Census, the village's population, as Bid Qatar-e Sofla, was 226 in 60 households. The following census in 2011 counted 244 people in 65 households, by which time the village was listed as Bid Qatar-e Pain. The 2016 census measured the population of the village as 217 people in 67 households.
