= Garkan-e Bala, Selseleh =

Village in Lorestan province, Iran

Garkan-e Bala Persian: گرکان بالا
- Village
- Location within Iran
- Coordinates: 33°54′53″N 48°15′36″E
- Country: Iran
- Province: Lorestan
- County: Selseleh
- District: Central
- Rural District: Yusefvand

Population (2016)
  - Total: 266
- Time zone: UTC+3:30 (IRST)

Garkan-e Bala (Persian: گرکان بالا) (Note: Also romanized as Garkān-e Bālā; formerly known as Garkan-e Olya (گركان عليا), also romanized as Garkān-e ‘Olyā; also known as Ḩasīnjān, Qara Khān, and Qareh Khān) is a village in Yusefvand Rural District (Note: Formerly Aleshtar Rural District) of the Central District in Selseleh County, Lorestan province, Iran.

== Demographics ==
=== Population ===
At the time of the 2006 National Census, the village's population, as Garkan-e Olya, was 304 in 73 households. The following census in 2011 counted 261 people in 68 households, by which time the village was listed as Garkan-e Bala. The 2016 census measured the population of the village as 266 people in 72 households.
