= Salehabad, Lorestan =

Village in Lorestan province, Iran

Salehabad Persian: صالح اباد
- Village
- Location within Iran
- Coordinates: 33°53′53″N 48°12′44″E
- Country: Iran
- Province: Lorestan
- County: Selseleh
- District: Central
- Rural District: Yusefvand

Population (2016)
  - Total: 325
- Time zone: UTC+3:30 (IRST)

Salehabad (Persian: صالح اباد) (Note: Also romanized as Şāleḩābād; also known as Şāleḩābād-e Mālmīr, Şāleḩābād-e ‘Olyā, and Salihābād) is a village in Yusefvand Rural District (Note: Formerly Aleshtar Rural District) of the Central District in Selseleh County, Lorestan province, Iran.

== Demographics ==
=== Population ===
At the time of the 2006 National Census, the village's population was 282 in 58 households. The following census in 2011 counted 320 people in 79 households. The 2016 census measured the population of the village as 325 people in 96 households.
