= Garkan-e Pain =

Village in Lorestan province, Iran

Garkan-e Pain Persian: گرکان پايين
- Village
- Location within Iran
- Coordinates: 33°54′24″N 48°15′37″E
- Country: Iran
- Province: Lorestan
- County: Selseleh
- District: Central
- Rural District: Yusefvand

Population (2016)
  - Total: 385
- Time zone: UTC+3:30 (IRST)

Garkan-e Pain (Persian: گرکان پايين) (Note: Also romanized as Garkān-e Pā’īn; formerly known as Garkan-e Sofla (گركان سفلي), also romanized as Garekān-e Soflá and Garkān-e Soflá) is a village in Yusefvand Rural District (Note: Formerly Aleshtar Rural District) of the Central District in Selseleh County, Lorestan province, Iran.

== Demographics ==
=== Population ===
At the time of the 2006 National Census, the village's population, as Garkan-e Sofla, was 470 in 98 households. The following census in 2011 counted 422 people in 99 households, by which time the village was listed as Garkan-e Pain. The 2016 census measured the population of the village as 385 people in 100 households.
