= Aleshtar =

City in Lorestan province, Iran

Aleshtar Persian: الشتر
- City
- Location within Iran
- Coordinates: 33°51′55″N 48°15′44″E
- Country: Iran
- Province: Lorestan
- County: Selseleh
- District: Central

Population (2016)
  - Total: 33,558
- Time zone: UTC+3:30 (IRST)

Aleshtar (Persian: الشتر) (Note: Also romanized as Alashtar; also known as Alishtār, Qal‘eh ‘Alishtār, and Qal‘eh Moz̧affari) is a city in the Central District of Selseleh County, Lorestan province, Iran, serving as capital of both the county and the district.

== Demographics ==
=== Ethnicity ===
The city is populated by Laki-speaking Kurds.

=== Population ===
At the time of the 2006 National Census, the city's population was 28,306 in 6,033 households. The following census in 2011 counted 30,257 people in 7,606 households. The 2016 census measured the population of the city as 33,558 people in 9,294 households.

== Climate ==
Aleshtar has a mediterranean climate(Csa) in Köppen climate classification with influences of continental climate(Dsa) as mean daily temperatures are near the freezing point in winter. Summers are dry and hot with very low precipitation from June to September.

Climate data for Aleshtar (1997-2010, elevation:1567.2)
Month	Jan	Feb	Mar	Apr	May	Jun	Jul	Aug	Sep	Oct	Nov	Dec	Year
Daily mean °C (°F)	0.9 (33.6)	3.4 (38.1)	7.5 (45.5)	11.7 (53.1)	15.5 (59.9)	20.1 (68.2)	23.7 (74.7)	23.8 (74.8)	19.2 (66.6)	14.7 (58.5)	8.2 (46.8)	4.1 (39.4)	12.7 (54.9)
Average precipitation mm (inches)	69.8 (2.75)	73.8 (2.91)	69.2 (2.72)	64.2 (2.53)	18.3 (0.72)	0.4 (0.02)	0.3 (0.01)	0.6 (0.02)	1.4 (0.06)	24.6 (0.97)	65.8 (2.59)	71.0 (2.80)	459.4 (18.1)
Source: IRIMO(temperature), (precipitation)
