= Qarchak =

City in Tehran province, Iran

Qarchak Persian: قرچک
- City
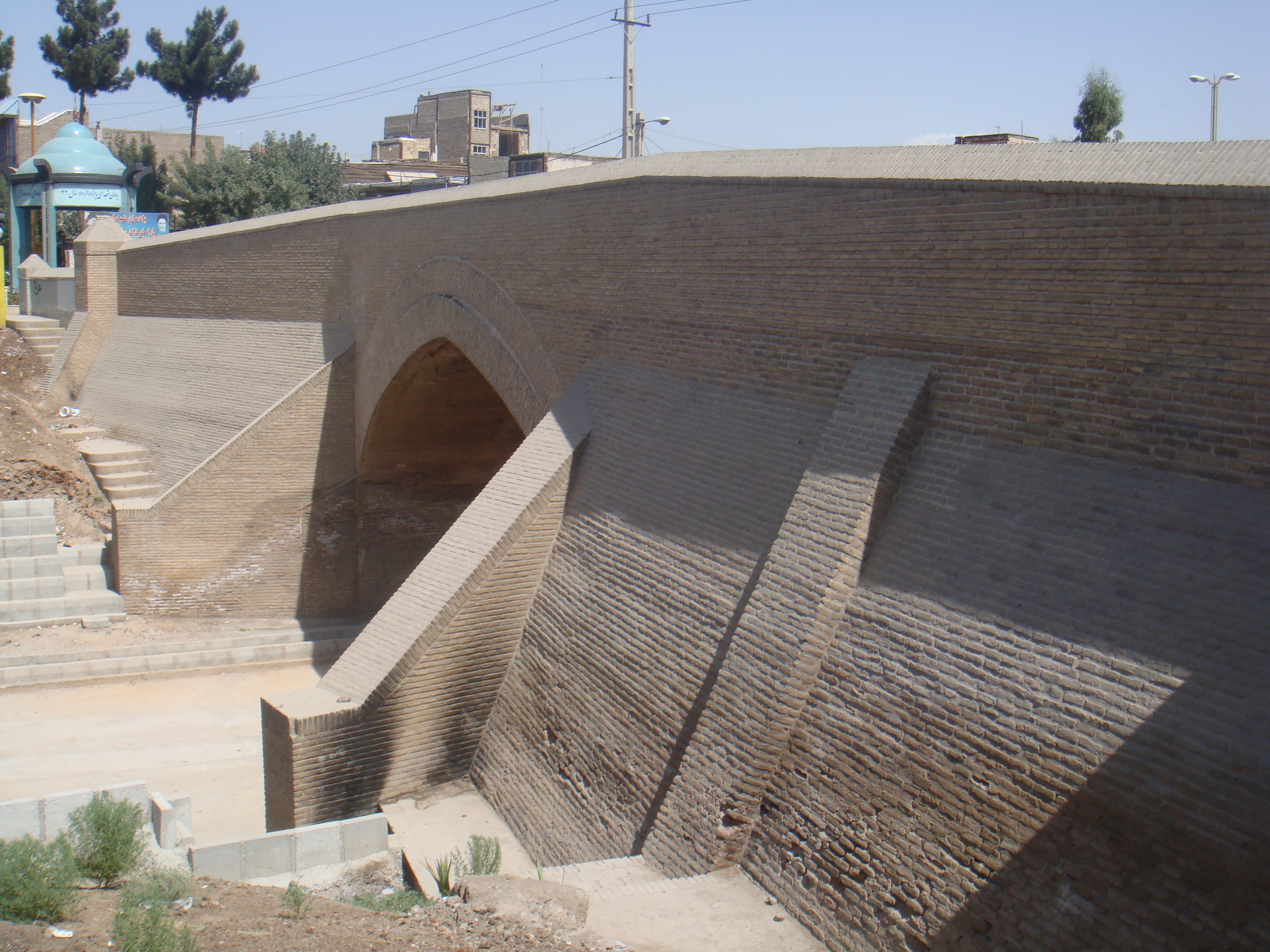
- Baqerabad Bridge in Qarchak

- Location within Iran
- Coordinates: 35°25′36″N 51°35′03″E
- Country: Iran
- Province: Tehran
- County: Qarchak
- District: Central

Population (2016)
  - Total: 231,075
- Time zone: UTC+3:30 (IRST)

Qarchak (Persian: قرچک) (Note: Also romanized as Qar Chak; also known as Qareh Chak) is a city in the Central District of Qarchak County, Tehran province, Iran, serving as capital of both the county and the district.

== Demographics ==
=== Population ===
At the time of the 2006 National Census, the city's population was 173,832 in 42,508 households, when it was capital of the former Qarchak District of Varamin County. The following census in 2011 counted 191,588 people in 52,769 households. The 2016 census measured the population of the city as 231,075 people in 69,029 households, by which time the district had been separated from the county in the establishment of Qarchak County. Qarchak was transferred to the new Central District as the county's capital.
