= Qeshlaq-e Jitu Rural District =

Rural district in Tehran province, Iran

Qeshlaq-e Jitu Rural District Persian: دهستان قشلاق جيتو
- Rural District
- Location within Iran
- Coordinates: 35°26′N 51°36′E
- Country: Iran
- Province: Tehran
- County: Qarchak
- District: Central
- Established: 2002
- Capital: Qeshlaq-e Jitu

Population (2016)
  - Total: 11,624
- Time zone: UTC+3:30 (IRST)

Qeshlaq-e Jitu Rural District (Persian: دهستان قشلاق جيتو) is in the Central District of Qarchak County, Tehran province, Iran. Its capital is the village of Qeshlaq-e Jitu.

== Demographics ==
=== Population ===
At the time of the 2006 National Census, the rural district's population (as a part of the former Qarchak District in Varamin County) was 10,687 in 2,512 households. There were 10,726 inhabitants in 2,844 households at the following census of 2011. The 2016 census measured the population of the rural district as 11,624 in 3,241 households, by which time the district had been separated from the county in the establishment of Qarchak County. The rural district was transferred to the new Central District. The most populous of its two villages was Qeshlaq-e Jitu, with 7,909 people.

=== Other villages in the rural district ===
- Salehabad
