= Alamabad, Selseleh =

Village in Lorestan province, Iran

Alamabad Persian: علم اباد
- Village
- Location within Iran
- Coordinates: 33°50′54″N 48°11′11″E
- Country: Iran
- Province: Lorestan
- County: Selseleh
- District: Central
- Rural District: Doab

Population (2016)
  - Total: 215
- Time zone: UTC+3:30 (IRST)

Alamabad (Persian: علم اباد) (Note: Also romanized as ‘Alamābād and ‘Alemābād) is a village in Doab Rural District of the Central District in Selseleh County, Lorestan province, Iran.

== Demographics ==
=== Population ===
At the time of the 2006 National Census, the village's population was 278 in 54 households. The following census in 2011 counted 250 people in 63 households. The 2016 census measured the population of the village as 215 people in 60 households.
