= Valiabad Rural District =

Rural district in Tehran province, Iran

Valiabad Rural District Persian: دهستان ولی‌آباد
- Rural District
- Location within Iran
- Coordinates: 35°24′N 51°32′E
- Country: Iran
- Province: Tehran
- County: Qarchak
- District: Central
- Established: 2002
- Capital: Valiabad

Population (2016)
  - Total: 26,437
- Time zone: UTC+3:30 (IRST)

Valiabad Rural District (Persian: دهستان ولی‌آباد) is in the Central District of Qarchak County, Tehran province, Iran. Its capital is the village of Valiabad.

== Demographics ==
=== Population ===
At the time of the 2006 National Census, the rural district's population (as a part of the former Qarchak District in Varamin County) was 27,430 in 6,380 households. There were 27,948 inhabitants in 7,292 households at the following census of 2011. The 2016 census measured the population of the rural district as 26,437 in 7,581 households, by which time the district had been separated from the county in the establishment of Qarchak County. The rural district was transferred to the new Central District. The most populous of its nine villages was Davudabad, with 6,399 people.

=== Other villages in the rural district ===
- Aminabad
- Mahmudabad-e Tabat Bayi
- Mohammadabad-e Ayala
- Qeshlaq-e Mashhadi Abu ol Hasan
- Qeshlaq-e Mashhadi Mohammad
- Raziabad
