= Dar Tang-e Pain =

Village in Lorestan province, Iran

Dar Tang-e Pain Persian: در تنگ پايين
- Village
- Location within Iran
- Coordinates: 33°56′11″N 48°16′24″E
- Country: Iran
- Province: Lorestan
- County: Selseleh
- District: Central
- Rural District: Yusefvand

Population (2016)
  - Total: 846
- Time zone: UTC+3:30 (IRST)

Dar Tang-e Pain (Persian: در تنگ پايين) (Note: Also romanized as Dar Tang-e Pā’īn; formerly known as Dar Tang-e Sofla (درتنگ سفلي), also romanized as Dar Tang-e Soflá; also known as Darreh Tang, Darreh Tang-e Kahmān-e Soflá, and Darreh Tang-e Soflá) is a village in Yusefvand Rural District (Note: Formerly Aleshtar Rural District) of the Central District in Selseleh County, Lorestan province, Iran.

== Demographics ==
=== Population ===
At the time of the 2006 National Census, the village's population, as Dar Tang-e Sofla, was 792 in 181 households. The following census in 2011 counted 870 people in 222 households, by which time the village was listed as Dar Tang-e Pain. The 2016 census measured the population of the village as 846 people in 242 households, the most populous in its rural district.
