= Dar Tang-e Bala =

Village in Lorestan province, Iran

Dar Tang-e Bala Persian: در تنگ بالا
- Village
- Location within Iran
- Coordinates: 33°55′56″N 48°16′52″E
- Country: Iran
- Province: Lorestan
- County: Selseleh
- District: Central
- Rural District: Yusefvand

Population (2016)
  - Total: 463
- Time zone: UTC+3:30 (IRST)

Dar Tang-e Bala (Persian: در تنگ بالا) (Note: Also romanized as Dar Tang-e Bālā; formerly known as Dar Tang-e Olya (درتنگ عليا), also romanized as Dar Tang-e ‘Olyā; also known as Dar Tang-e Kahmān, Dar Tang-i-Kehmān, Darreh Tang, Darreh Tang-e Kahmān-e Bālā, Darreh Tang-e Kahmān-e ‘Olyā, Darreh Tang-e ‘Olyā, and Kahmān) is a village in Yusefvand Rural District (Note: Formerly Aleshtar Rural District) of the Central District in Selseleh County, Lorestan province, Iran.

== Demographics ==
=== Population ===
At the time of the 2006 National Census, the village's population, as Dar Tang-e Olya, was 474 in 94 households. The following census in 2011 counted 478 people in 116 households, by which time the village was listed as Dar Tang-e Bala. The 2016 census measured the population of the village as 463 people in 130 households.
