= Salehabad, Rivand =

Salehabad صالح اباد
- Village
- Location within Iran
- Coordinates: 36°05′44″N 58°52′46″E
- Country: Iran
- Province: Razavi Khorasan
- County: Nishapur
- Bakhsh: Central
- Rural District: Rivand

Population (2006)
  - Total: 155
- Time zone: UTC+3:30 (IRST)
  - Summer (DST): UTC+4:30 (IRDT)

Salehabad (Persian: صالح اباد, also Romanized as Şāleḩābād) is a village in Rivand Rural District, in the Central District of Nishapur County, Razavi Khorasan Province, Iran. At the 2006 census, its population was 155, in 42 families.
