= Kordabad, Tabas =

Kordabad كرداباد
- Village
- Location within Iran
- Coordinates: 33°41′24″N 56°50′17″E
- Country: Iran
- Province: South Khorasan
- County: Tabas
- Bakhsh: Central
- Rural District: Montazeriyeh

Population (2006)
  - Total: 145
- Time zone: UTC+3:30 (IRST)
  - Summer (DST): UTC+4:30 (IRDT)

Kordabad (Persian: كرداباد, also Romanized as Kordābād and Kerdābād) is a village in Montazeriyeh Rural District, in the Central District of Tabas County, South Khorasan Province, Iran. At the 2006 census, its population was 145, in 27 families.
