= Salehabad, Sari =

Salehabad صالح آباد
- Village
- Interactive map of Salehabad
- Coordinates: 36°41′46.583″N 53°5′29.663″E
- Country: Iran
- Province: Mazandaran
- County: Sari
- Bakhsh: Rudpey
- Rural District: Rudpey-ye Sharqi

Population (2016)
  - Total: 174
- Time zone: UTC+3:30 (IRST)

Salehabad (Persian: صالح آباد, also Romanized as Şāleḩābād) is a village in Rudpey-ye Sharqi Rural District, in the Rudpey District of Sari County, Mazandaran Province, Iran. At the 2016 census, its population was 174, in 59 families. Up from 151 in 2006.
