= Salehabad-e Sofla =

Salehabad-e Sofla صالح ابادسفلي
- Village
- Location within Iran
- Coordinates: 29°41′37″N 56°20′55″E
- Country: Iran
- Province: Kerman
- County: Sirjan
- Bakhsh: Central
- Rural District: Chahar Gonbad

Population (2006)
  - Total: 18
- Time zone: UTC+3:30 (IRST)
  - Summer (DST): UTC+4:30 (IRDT)

Salehabad-e Sofla (Persian: صالح ابادسفلي, also Romanized as Şaleḩābād-e Soflá; also known as Şaleḩābād) is a village in Chahar Gonbad Rural District, in the Central District of Sirjan County, Kerman Province, Iran. At the 2006 census, its population was 18, in 4 families.
