= Salehabad, Neyriz =

Salehabad صالح اباد
- Village
- Location within Iran
- Coordinates: 29°37′54″N 54°03′40″E
- Country: Iran
- Province: Fars
- County: Neyriz
- Bakhsh: Abadeh Tashk
- Rural District: Hana

Population (2006)
  - Total: 530
- Time zone: UTC+3:30 (IRST)
  - Summer (DST): UTC+4:30 (IRDT)

Salehabad (Persian: صالح اباد, also romanized as Şāleḩābād) is a village in Hana Rural District, Abadeh Tashk District, Neyriz County, Fars province, Iran. At the 2006 census, its population was 530, in 119 families.
