= Jamshidabad-e Heydar =

Jamshidabad-e Heydar جمشيدابادحيدر
- Village
- Location within Iran
- Coordinates: 33°27′10″N 48°40′30″E
- Country: Iran
- Province: Lorestan
- County: Khorramabad
- Bakhsh: Zagheh
- Rural District: Zagheh

Population (2006)
  - Total: 44
- Time zone: UTC+3:30 (IRST)
  - Summer (DST): UTC+4:30 (IRDT)

Jamshidabad-e Heydar (Persian: جمشيدابادحيدر, also Romanized as Jamshīdābād-e Ḩeydar; also known as Jamshīdābād and Ḩamīdābād) is a village in Zagheh Rural District, Zagheh District, Khorramabad County, Lorestan Province, Iran. At the 2006 census, its population was 44, in 10 families.
