= Chenareh-ye Majid =

Chenareh-ye Majid چناره مجيد
- Village
- Location within Iran
- Coordinates: 34°39′52″N 45°53′04″E
- Country: Iran
- Province: Kermanshah
- County: Salas-e Babajani
- Bakhsh: Ozgoleh
- Rural District: Jeygaran

Population (2006)
  - Total: 224
- Time zone: UTC+3:30 (IRST)
  - Summer (DST): UTC+4:30 (IRDT)

Chenareh-ye Majid (Persian: چناره مجيد, also Romanized as Chenāreh-ye Majīd) is a village and commercial hub in Jeygaran Rural District, Ozgoleh District, Salas-e Babajani County, Kermanshah Province, Iran. At the 2006 census, its population was 224, in 32 families.
