= Jamshidabad, South Khorasan =

Jamshidabad جمشيداباد
- Village
- Location within Iran
- Coordinates: 32°16′01″N 58°52′19″E
- Country: Iran
- Province: South Khorasan
- County: Khusf
- Bakhsh: Jolgeh-e Mazhan
- Rural District: Qaleh Zari

Population (2006)
  - Total: 19
- Time zone: UTC+3:30 (IRST)
  - Summer (DST): UTC+4:30 (IRDT)

Jamshidabad (Persian: جمشيداباد, also Romanized as Jamshīdābād) is a village in Qaleh Zari Rural District, Jolgeh-e Mazhan District, Khusf County, South Khorasan Province, Iran. At the 2006 census, its population was 19, in 7 families.
