= Jamshidabad, Delfan =

Jamshidabad جمشيداباد
- Village
- Location within Iran
- Coordinates: 34°08′34″N 47°40′41″E
- Country: Iran
- Province: Lorestan
- County: Delfan
- Bakhsh: Kakavand
- Rural District: Kakavand-e Sharqi

Population (2006)
  - Total: 61
- Time zone: UTC+3:30 (IRST)
  - Summer (DST): UTC+4:30 (IRDT)

Jamshidabad (Persian: جمشيداباد, also Romanized as Jamshīdābād) is a village in Kakavand-e Sharqi Rural District, Kakavand District, Delfan County, Lorestan Province, Iran. At the 2006 census, its population was 61, in 14 families.
