= Chenareh, Lorestan =

Village in Lorestan, Iran

Chenareh چناره
- Village
- Location within Iran
- Coordinates: 33°18′36″N 47°58′46″E
- Country: Iran
- Province: Lorestan
- County: Pol-e Dokhtar
- Bakhsh: Central
- Rural District: Miyankuh-e Gharbi

Population (2006)
  - Total: 24
- Time zone: UTC+3:30 (IRST)
  - Summer (DST): UTC+4:30 (IRDT)

Chenareh (Persian: چناره, also Romanized as Chenāreh; also known as Chenāreh-ye Shīrānī) is a village in Miyankuh-e Gharbi Rural District, in the Central District of Pol-e Dokhtar County, Lorestan Province, Iran. At the 2006 census, its population was 24, in 4 families.
