= Alamabad-e Mohandes =

Alamabad-e Mohandes علم‌آباد مهندس
- Village
- Location within Iran
- Coordinates: 30°53′03″N 48°27′30″E
- Country: Iran
- Province: Khuzestan
- County: Shadegan
- Bakhsh: Central
- Rural District: Darkhoveyn

Population (2006)
  - Total: 94
- Time zone: UTC+3:30 (IRST)
  - Summer (DST): UTC+4:30 (IRDT)

Alamabad-e Mohandes (Persian: علم‌آباد مهندس, also Romanized as ‘Alamābād-e Mohandes; also known as ‘Alamābād and Mohandes) is a village in Darkhoveyn Rural District, in the Central District of Shadegan County, Khuzestan Province, Iran. At the 2006 census, its population was 94, in 17 families.
