= Salehabad, Baneh =

Salehabad صالح آباد
- Village
- Location within Iran
- Coordinates: 36°03′04″N 45°44′34″E
- Country: Iran
- Province: Kurdistan
- County: Baneh
- Bakhsh: Namshir
- Rural District: Kani Sur

Population (2006)
  - Total: 60
- Time zone: UTC+3:30 (IRST)
  - Summer (DST): UTC+4:30 (IRDT)

Salehabad (Persian: صالح آباد, also Romanized as Şāleḩābād) is a village in Kani Sur Rural District, Namshir District, Baneh County, Kurdistan Province, Iran. At the 2006 census, its population was 60, in 13 families. The village is populated by Kurds.
