= Darreh Tang, Lorestan =

Darreh Tang دره‌تنگ
- Village
- Location within Iran
- Coordinates: 33°35′16″N 48°56′12″E
- Country: Iran
- Province: Lorestan
- County: Dorud
- Bakhsh: Silakhor
- Rural District: Silakhor

Population (2006)
  - Total: 195
- Time zone: UTC+3:30 (IRST)
  - Summer (DST): UTC+4:30 (IRDT)

Darreh Tang (Persian: دره‌تنگ; also known as Deh Kalleh) is a village in Silakhor Rural District, Silakhor District, Dorud County, Lorestan Province, Iran. At the 2006 census, its population was 195, in 46 families.
