= Elmabad, West Azerbaijan =

Elmabad علم اباد
- Village
- Location within Iran
- Coordinates: 36°34′42″N 45°57′16″E
- Country: Iran
- Province: West Azerbaijan
- County: Bukan
- Bakhsh: Central
- Rural District: Il Teymur

Population (2006)
  - Total: 101
- Time zone: UTC+3:30 (IRST)
  - Summer (DST): UTC+4:30 (IRDT)

Elmabad (Persian: علم اباد, also Romanized as ‘Elmābād) is a village in Il Teymur Rural District, in the Central District of Bukan County, West Azerbaijan Province, Iran. At the 2006 census, its population was 101, in 19 families.
