= Kordabad, Yazd =

Kordabad كرداباد
- Village
- Location within Iran
- Coordinates: 31°32′24″N 53°44′32″E
- Country: Iran
- Province: Yazd
- County: Taft
- Bakhsh: Central
- Rural District: Dehshir

Population (2006)
  - Total: 198
- Time zone: UTC+3:30 (IRST)
  - Summer (DST): UTC+4:30 (IRDT)

Kordabad (Persian: كرداباد, also Romanized as Kordābād) is a village in Dehshir Rural District, in the Central District of Taft County, Yazd Province, Iran. At the 2006 census, its population was 198, in 53 families.
