= Alamabad, Fars =

Alamabad علم اباد
- Village
- Location within Iran
- Coordinates: 30°35′05″N 53°24′30″E
- Country: Iran
- Province: Fars
- County: Bavanat
- Bakhsh: Central
- Rural District: Baghestan

Population (2006)
  - Total: 30
- Time zone: UTC+3:30 (IRST)
  - Summer (DST): UTC+4:30 (IRDT)

Alamabad (Persian: علم اباد, also Romanized as 'Alamābād; also known as 'Elmābād, Qalamābād, and Qalamābād) is a village in Baghestan Rural District, in the Central District of Bavanat County, Fars province, Iran. At the 2006 census, its population was 30, in 7 families.
