= Salehabad, Tonekabon =

Salehabad صالح اباد
- Village
- Location within Iran
- Coordinates: 36°49′14″N 50°45′36″E
- Country: Iran
- Province: Mazandaran
- County: Tonekabon
- Bakhsh: Central
- Rural District: Goli Jan

Population (2006)
  - Total: 253
- Time zone: UTC+3:30 (IRST)
  - Summer (DST): UTC+4:30 (IRDT)

Salehabad (Persian: صالح اباد, also Romanized as Şāleḩābād) is a village in Goli Jan Rural District, in the Central District of Tonekabon County, Mazandaran Province, Iran. At the 2006 census, its population was 253, in 77 families.
