= Chenareh-ye Ali Madad =

Chenareh-ye Ali Madad چناره علي مدد
- Village
- Location within Iran
- Coordinates: 34°38′12″N 45°54′38″E
- Country: Iran
- Province: Kermanshah
- County: Salas-e Babajani
- Bakhsh: Ozgoleh
- Rural District: Jeygaran

Population (2006)
  - Total: 120
- Time zone: UTC+3:30 (IRST)
  - Summer (DST): UTC+4:30 (IRDT)

Chenareh-ye Ali Madad (Persian: چناره علي مدد, also Romanized as Chenāreh-ye 'Alī Madad; also known as Chenāreh-ye 'Alī Mūr) is a village in Jeygaran Rural District, Ozgoleh District, Salas-e Babajani County, Kermanshah province, Iran. At the 2006 census, its population was 120, in 20 families.
