= Naservand, Khorramabad =

Naservand ناصروند
- Village
- Location within Iran
- Coordinates: 33°24′20″N 48°23′54″E
- Country: Iran
- Province: Lorestan
- County: Khorramabad
- Bakhsh: Central
- Rural District: Koregah-e Sharqi

Population (2006)
  - Total: 852
- Time zone: UTC+3:30 (IRST)
  - Summer (DST): UTC+4:30 (IRDT)

Naservand (Persian: ناصروند, also Romanized as Nāşervand; also known as Nausarwān) is a village in Koregah-e Sharqi Rural District, in the Central District of Khorramabad County, Lorestan Province, Iran. At the 2006 census, its population was 852, in 169 families.
