= Alamabad, Mirjaveh =

Alamabad اعلم اباد
- Village
- Location within Iran
- Coordinates: 28°45′00″N 61°10′00″E
- Country: Iran
- Province: Sistan and Baluchestan
- County: Mirjaveh
- Bakhsh: Central
- Rural District: Tamin

Population (2006)
  - Total: 33
- Time zone: UTC+3:30 (IRST)
  - Summer (DST): UTC+4:30 (IRDT)

Alamabad (Persian: اعلم اباد, also Romanized as ‘Alamābād) is a village in Tamin Rural District, in the Central District of Mirjaveh County, Sistan and Baluchestan Province, Iran. At the 2006 census, its population was 33, in 7 families.
