= Shahpurabad, Kermanshah =

Shahpurabad شاهپوراباد
- Village
- Location within Iran
- Coordinates: 34°42′27″N 47°19′02″E
- Country: Iran
- Province: Kermanshah
- County: Sahneh
- Bakhsh: Dinavar
- Rural District: Horr

Population (2006)
  - Total: 319
- Time zone: UTC+3:30 (IRST)
  - Summer (DST): UTC+4:30 (IRDT)

Shahpurabad (Persian: شاهپوراباد, also Romanized as Shāhpūrābād; also known as Shāpūrābād) is a village in Horr Rural District, Dinavar District, Sahneh County, Kermanshah Province, Iran. At the 2006 census, its population was 319, in 70 families.
