= Bid Qatar-e Bon Rud =

Bid Qatar-e Bon Rud بيدقطاربن رود
- Village
- Location within Iran
- Coordinates: 29°44′41″N 51°52′51″E
- Country: Iran
- Province: Fars
- County: Shiraz
- Bakhsh: Arzhan
- Rural District: Dasht-e Arzhan

Population (2006)
  - Total: 103
- Time zone: UTC+3:30 (IRST)
  - Summer (DST): UTC+4:30 (IRDT)

Bid Qatar-e Bon Rud (Persian: بيدقطاربن رود, also Romanized as Bīd Qaţār-e Bon Rūd; also known as Bīdqaţār) is a village in Dasht-e Arzhan Rural District, Arzhan District, Shiraz County, Fars province, Iran. At the 2006 census, its population was 103, in 20 families.
