= Salehabad, Saveh =

Salehabad صالح اباد
- Village
- Location within Iran
- Coordinates: 34°49′22″N 50°22′39″E
- Country: Iran
- Province: Markazi
- County: Saveh
- Bakhsh: Central
- Rural District: Qareh Chay

Population (2006)
  - Total: 242
- Time zone: UTC+3:30 (IRST)
  - Summer (DST): UTC+4:30 (IRDT)

Salehabad (Persian: صالح اباد, also Romanized as Şāleḩābād) is a village in Qareh Chay Rural District, in the Central District of Saveh County, Markazi Province, Iran. At the 2006 census, its population was 242, in 56 families.
