= Chenareh, Sanandaj =

Chenareh چناره
- Village
- Location within Iran
- Coordinates: 35°11′01″N 46°58′23″E
- Country: Iran
- Province: Kurdistan
- County: Sanandaj
- Bakhsh: Central
- Rural District: Abidar

Population (2006)
  - Total: 225
- Time zone: UTC+3:30 (IRST)
  - Summer (DST): UTC+4:30 (IRDT)

Chenareh (Persian: چناره, also Romanized as Chenāreh; also known as Chīnareh) is a village in Abidar Rural District, in the Central District of Sanandaj County, Kurdistan Province, Iran. At the 2006 census, its population was 225, in 53 families. The village is populated by Kurds.
