= Alamabad, Kerman =

Alamabad علم اباد
- Village
- Location within Iran
- Coordinates: 30°28′11″N 55°56′43″E
- Country: Iran
- Province: Kerman
- County: Rafsanjan
- Bakhsh: Central
- Rural District: Razmavaran

Population (2006)
  - Total: 409
- Time zone: UTC+3:30 (IRST)
  - Summer (DST): UTC+4:30 (IRDT)

Alamabad (Persian: علم اباد, also Romanized as ‘Alamābād; also known as ‘Elmābād) is a village in Razmavaran Rural District, in the Central District of Rafsanjan County, Kerman Province, Iran. At the 2006 census, its population was 409, in 109 families.
