= Jamshidabad-e Mirza =

Jamshidabad-e Mirza جمشيدابادميرزا
- Village
- Location within Iran
- Coordinates: 33°27′29″N 48°39′47″E
- Country: Iran
- Province: Lorestan
- County: Khorramabad
- Bakhsh: Zagheh
- Rural District: Zagheh

Population (2006)
  - Total: 31
- Time zone: UTC+3:30 (IRST)
  - Summer (DST): UTC+4:30 (IRDT)

Jamshidabad-e Mirza (Persian: جمشيدابادميرزا, also Romanized as Jamshīdābād-e Mīrzā) is a village in Zagheh Rural District, Zagheh District, Khorramabad County, Lorestan Province, Iran. At the 2006 census, its population was 31, in 8 families.
