= Solhabad, Semnan =

Solhabad صلح آباد
- Village
- Location within Iran
- Coordinates: 35°55′45″N 54°17′37″E
- Country: Iran
- Province: Semnan
- County: Damghan
- Bakhsh: Amirabad
- Rural District: Qohab-e Rastaq

Population (2006)
  - Total: 54
- Time zone: UTC+3:30 (IRST)
  - Summer (DST): UTC+4:30 (IRDT)

Solhabad (Persian: صلح آباد, also Romanized as Şolḩābād and Sāleh Ābād; also known as Şolḩābādū and Sūlhābād) is a village in Qohab-e Rastaq Rural District, Amirabad District, Damghan County, Semnan Province, Iran. At the 2006 census, its population was 54, in 24 families.
