= Alamabad, Dorud =

Village in Lorestan province, Iran

Alamabad عالم آباد
- Village
- Location within Iran
- Coordinates: 33°37′49″N 48°58′10″E
- Country: Iran
- Province: Lorestan
- County: Dorud
- District: Silakhor
- Rural District: Silakhor

Population (2016)
  - Total: 313
- Time zone: UTC+3:30 (IRST)

Alamabad (Persian: عالم آباد) (Note: Also romanized as ‘Ālamābād and ‘Ālāmābād; also known as ‘Ālamābād-e Soflá and ‘Alemābād) is a village in Silakhor Rural District of Silakhor District in Dorud County, Lorestan province, Iran.

== Demographics ==
=== Population ===
At the time of the 2006 National Census, the village's population was 392 in 99 households. The following census in 2011 counted 328 people in 97 households. The 2016 census measured the population of the village as 313 people in 100 households.
