= Salehabadu =

Salehabadu صالح آبادو
- Village
- Location within Iran
- Coordinates: 36°00′22″N 54°17′02″E
- Country: Iran
- Province: Semnan
- County: Damghan
- Bakhsh: Amirabad
- Rural District: Qohab-e Rastaq

Population (2006)
  - Total: 70
- Time zone: UTC+3:30 (IRST)
  - Summer (DST): UTC+4:30 (IRDT)

Salehabadu (Persian: صالح آبادو, also Romanized as Şāleḩābādū; also known as Solhābād and Şāleḩābād) is a village in Qohab-e Rastaq Rural District, Amirabad District, Damghan County, Semnan Province, Iran. At the 2006 census, its population was 70, in 23 families.
