= Qaleh-ye Mozaffari Rural District =

Rural district in Lorestan province, Iran

Qaleh-ye Mozaffari Rural District Persian: دهستان قلعه مظفرئ
- Rural District
- Location within Iran
- Coordinates: 33°54′N 48°23′E
- Country: Iran
- Province: Lorestan
- County: Selseleh
- District: Central
- Established: 1990
- Capital: Cheshmeh Barqi

Population (2016)
  - Total: 6,947
- Time zone: UTC+3:30 (IRST)

Qaleh-ye Mozaffari Rural District (Persian: دهستان قلعه مظفرئ) is in the Central District of Selseleh County, Lorestan province, Iran. Its capital is the village of Cheshmeh Barqi.

== Demographics ==
=== Population ===
At the time of the 2006 National Census, the rural district's population was 7,087 in 1,479 households. There were 6,644 inhabitants in 1,696 households at the following census of 2011. The 2016 census measured the population of the rural district as 6,947 in 2,009 households. The most populous of its 41 villages was Amir-e Sofla, with 724 people.

=== Other villages in the rural district ===
- Abbasabad
- Aliabad-e Javanmard
- Alqasabad
- Amir-e Bala
- Nurabad-e Cheshmeh Barqi
- Raziabad
- Sarab Sorkheh Ahmadabad
