= Central District (Qarchak County) =

District in Tehran province, Iran

Central District (Qarchak County) Persian: بخش مرکزی شهرستان قرچک
- District
- Location within Iran
- Coordinates: 35°25′N 51°33′E
- Country: Iran
- Province: Tehran
- County: Qarchak
- Established: 2012
- Capital: Qarchak

Population (2016)
  - Total: 269,138
- Time zone: UTC+3:30 (IRST)

The Central District of Qarchak County (Persian: بخش مرکزی شهرستان قرچک) is in Tehran province, Iran. Its capital is the city of Qarchak.

== History ==
In 2012, Qarchak District was separated from Varamin County in the establishment of Qarchak County, which was divided into one district of two rural districts, with Qarchak as its capital and only city at the time.

== Demographics ==
=== Population ===
At the time of the 2016 National Census, the district's population was 269,138 inhabitants in 79,853 households.

=== Administrative divisions ===
Central District (Qarchak County) Population
Administrative Divisions	2016
Qeshlaq-e Jitu RD	11,624
Valiabad RD	26,437
Qarchak (city)	231,075
Total	269,138
RD = Rural District
