= Qarchak County =

County in Tehran province, Iran

Qarchak County Persian: شهرستان قرچک
- County
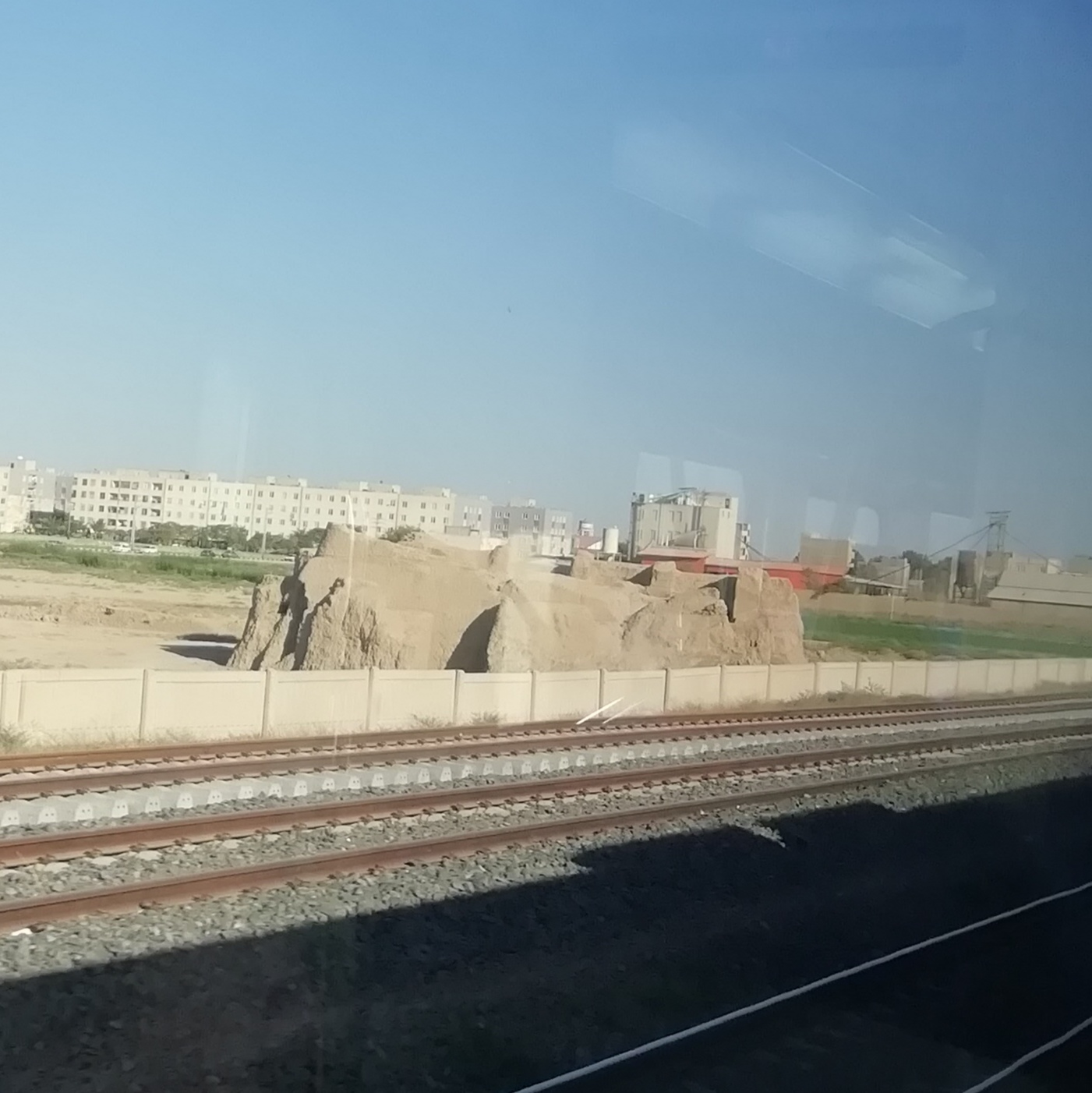
- Historial ruins in Puinak near the city of Qarchak

- Location of Qarchak County in Tehran province (center, yellow)

- Location of Tehran province in Iran
- Coordinates: 35°25′N 51°33′E
- Country: Iran
- Province: Tehran
- Established: 2012
- Capital: Qarchak
- Districts: Central

Area
  - Total: 90.2 km^{2} (34.8 sq mi)

Population (2016)
  - Total: 269,138
  - Density: 2,980/km^{2} (7,730/sq mi)
- Time zone: UTC+3:30 (IRST)

Qarchak County (Persian: شهرستان قرچک) is in Tehran province, Iran. The capital of the county is the city of Qarchak.

== History ==
In 2012, Qarchak District was separated from Varamin County in the establishment of Qarchak County, which was divided into one district of two rural districts, with Qarchak as its capital and only city at the time.

== Demographics ==
=== Population ===
At the time of the 2016 National Census, the county's population was 269,138 in 79,853 households.

=== Administrative divisions ===
Qarchak County's population and administrative structure are shown in the following table.

Qarchak County Population
Administrative Divisions	2016
Central District	269,138
Qeshlaq-e Jitu RD	11,624
Valiabad RD	26,437
Qarchak (city)	231,075
Total	269,138
RD = Rural District

== See also ==
Media related to Qarchak County at Wikimedia Commons
