= Qarchak District =

Former district in Tehran province, Iran

Qarchak District Persian: بخش قرچک
- Former District
- Location within Iran
- Coordinates: 35°25′N 51°33′E
- Country: Iran
- Province: Tehran
- County: Varamin
- Established: 2002
- Capital: Qarchak

Population (2011)
  - Total: 230,262
- Time zone: UTC+3:30 (IRST)

Qarchak District (Persian: بخش قرچک) is a former administrative division of Varamin County, Tehran province, Iran. Its capital was the city of Qarchak.

== History ==
In 2012, the district was separated from the county in the establishment of Qarchak County.

== Demographics ==
=== Population ===
At the time of the 2006 National Census, the district's population was 211,949 in 51,400 households. The following census in 2011 counted 230,262 people in 62,905 households.

=== Administrative divisions ===
Qarchak District Population
Administrative Divisions	2006	2011
Qeshlaq-e Jitu RD	10,687	10,726
Valiabad RD	27,430	27,948
Qarchak (city)	173,832	191,588
Total	211,949	230,262
RD = Rural District
