= Yusefvand Rural District =

Rural district in Lorestan province, Iran

Yusefvand Rural District Persian: دهستان يوسف وند
- Rural District
- Location within Iran
- Coordinates: 33°56′N 48°20′E
- Country: Iran
- Province: Lorestan
- County: Selseleh
- District: Central
- Established: 1987
- Capital: Deh-e Rahm

Population (2016)
  - Total: 8,298
- Time zone: UTC+3:30 (IRST)

Yusefvand Rural District (Persian: دهستان يوسف وند) (Note: Formerly Aleshtar Rural District (دهستان الشتر)) is in the Central District of Selseleh County, Lorestan province, Iran. Its capital is the village of Deh-e Rahm.

== Demographics ==
=== Population ===
At the time of the 2006 National Census, the rural district's population was 8,951 in 1,863 households. There were 8,733 inhabitants in 2,123 households at the following census of 2011. The 2016 census measured the population of the rural district as 8,298 in 2,273 households. The most populous of its 48 villages was Dar Tang-e Sofla, with 846 people.

=== Other villages in the rural district ===
- Dakamavand-e Bala
- Dakamavand-e Pain
- Dar Tang-e Bala
- Garkan-e Bala
- Garkan-e Pain
- Goriran-e Bala
- Goriran-e Pain
- Salehabad
