= Doab Rural District (Selseleh County) =

Rural district in Lorestan province, Iran

Doab Rural District Persian: دهستان دوآب
- Rural District
- Location within Iran
- Coordinates: 33°49′N 48°10′E
- Country: Iran
- Province: Lorestan
- County: Selseleh
- District: Central
- Established: 1990
- Capital: Mowmenabad

Population (2016)
  - Total: 4,381
- Time zone: UTC+3:30 (IRST)

Doab Rural District (Persian: دهستان دوآب) is in the Central District of Selseleh County, Lorestan province, Iran. Its capital is the village of Mowmenabad.

== Demographics ==
=== Population ===
At the time of the 2006 National Census, the rural district's population was 5,486 in 1,053 households. There were 4,959 inhabitants in 1,227 households at the following census of 2011. The 2016 census measured the population of the rural district as 4,381 in 1,263 households. The most populous of its 61 villages was Mowmenabad, with 406 people.

=== Other villages in the rural district ===
- Ahangaran
- Alamabad
- Feyzabad
- Hendi
- Kazemabad
- Rezaabad
