= Honam Rural District =

Rural district in Lorestan province, Iran

Honam Rural District Persian: دهستان هنام
- Rural District
- Location within Iran
- Coordinates: 33°46′N 48°17′E
- Country: Iran
- Province: Lorestan
- County: Selseleh
- District: Central
- Established: 1987
- Capital: Sarab-e Siyah Push

Population (2016)
  - Total: 6,207
- Time zone: UTC+3:30 (IRST)

Honam Rural District (Persian: دهستان هنام) (Note: Formerly Selseleh Rural District (دهستان سلسله)) is in the Central District of Selseleh County, Lorestan province, Iran. Its capital is the village of Sarab-e Siyah Push.

== Demographics ==
=== Population ===
At the time of the 2006 National Census, the rural district's population was 6,788 in 1,504 households. There were 6,477 inhabitants in 1,640 households at the following census of 2011. The 2016 census measured the population of the rural district as 6,207 in 1,768 households. The most populous of its 71 villages was Sarab-e Saqqa, with 435 people.

=== Other villages in the rural district ===
- Bid Qatar-e Bala
- Bid Qatar-e Pain
- Darmahi
- Khosrowabad-e Paresk
- Paresk
- Sarab Chenar-e Bala
- Sarab Chenar-e Sofla
- Sarab-e Honam
