= Central District (Selseleh County) =

District in Lorestan province, Iran

Central District (Selseleh County) Persian: بخش مرکزی شهرستان سلسله
- District
- Location within Iran
- Coordinates: 33°50′N 48°18′E
- Country: Iran
- Province: Lorestan
- County: Selseleh
- Established: 1994
- Capital: Aleshtar

Population (2016)
  - Total: 59,391
- Time zone: UTC+3:30 (IRST)

The Central District of Selseleh County (Persian: بخش مرکزی شهرستان سلسله) is in Lorestan province, Iran. Its capital is the city of Aleshtar.

== Demographics ==
=== Population ===
At the time of the 2006 National Census, the district's population was 56,618 in 11,952 households. The following census in 2011 counted 57,070 people in 14,292 households. The 2016 census measured the population of the district as 59,391 inhabitants in 16,607 households.

=== Administrative divisions ===
Central District (Selseleh County) Population
| Administrative Divisions | 2006 | 2011 | 2016 |
|---|---|---|---|
| Doab RD | 5,486 | 4,959 | 4,381 |
| Honam RD (Note: Formerly Selseleh Rural District) | 6,788 | 6,477 | 6,207 |
| Qaleh-ye Mozaffari RD | 7,087 | 6,644 | 6,947 |
| Yusefvand RD (Note: Formerly Aleshtar Rural District) | 8,951 | 8,733 | 8,298 |
| Aleshtar (city) | 28,306 | 30,257 | 33,558 |
| Total | 56,618 | 57,070 | 59,391 |
RD = Rural District
