= Selseleh County =

County in Lorestan province, Iran

Selseleh County Persian: شهرستان سلسله
- County
- Location of Selseleh County in Lorestan province (top, purple)

- Location of Lorestan province in Iran
- Coordinates: 33°48′N 48°06′E
- Country: Iran
- Province: Lorestan
- Established: 1994
- Capital: Aleshtar
- Districts: Central, Firuzabad

Population (2016)
  - Total: 75,559
- Time zone: UTC+3:30 (IRST)

Selseleh County (Persian: شهرستان سلسله) is in Lorestan province, Iran. Its capital is the city of Aleshtar.

== Demographics ==
=== Ethnicity ===
The county is populated by Laki Kurds.

=== Population ===
At the time of the 2006 National Census, the county's population was 73,819 in 15,531 households. The following census in 2011 counted 73,154 people in 18,231 households. The 2016 census measured the population of the county as 75,559 in 21,140 households.

=== Administrative divisions ===
Selseleh County's population history and administrative structure over three consecutive censuses are shown in the following table.

Selseleh County Population
Administrative Divisions	2006	2011	2016
Central District	56,618	57,070	59,391
Doab RD	5,486	4,959	4,381
Honam RD (Note: Formerly Selseleh Rural District)	6,788	6,477	6,207
Qaleh-ye Mozaffari RD	7,087	6,644	6,947
Yusefvand RD (Note: Formerly Aleshtar Rural District)	8,951	8,733	8,298
Aleshtar (city)	28,306	30,257	33,558
Firuzabad District	17,201	16,084	16,168
Firuzabad RD	11,503	10,615	10,092
Qalayi RD	2,841	2,593	2,677
Firuzabad (city)	2,857	2,876	3,399
Total	73,819	73,154	75,559
RD = Rural District

== See also ==
Media related to Selseleh County at Wikimedia Commons
