= Amir (name) =

Amir or Amiri
- Pronunciation: Arabic: [ʔaˈmi:r], Persian pronunciation: [æmiːˈɾ]
- Gender: Male
- Language: Arabic, Persian, Pashto, Urdu

Other gender
- Feminine: Amira

Origin
- Meaning: 'prince', 'chief' (Arabic); 'immortal' (Persian)
- Region of origin: Arabia, Iran.

Other names
- Alternative spelling: Ameer, Amer, Amiri
- Variant forms: Emir, Almir, Admir

Amir (also spelled Ameer or Emir; (Arabic: أمير, Persian: امیر, Persian pronunciation: [æmiːˈɾ], Hebrew: אמיר) is a masculine name of multi-lingual origin.

== Meaning ==
In Arabic the name means prince or royal. The word originally meant 'commander (of army)'. It later became a title given to a ruler's son, and hence 'prince'. In Arabic, the name comes from the same root as the word emir. In Urdu (Urdu: عامر) the name has the same meaning as the original in Arabic, meaning ‘prince”. In Pashto (Pashto: امير) the name comes to mean ‘leader’ or ‘boss’.

== Usage ==
Amir is most common as a given name in Iran.

Amir was among the five most popular names for Black newborn boys in the American state of Virginia in 2022 and again in 2023.

In the Balkans, Amir is popular among Bosniaks in the former Yugoslav nations. The name is a modification to the name Emir.

== Given name ==
=== Amir ===
- Al-Amir bi-Ahkami l-Lah (1096–1130), tenth Fatimid Caliph and recognised as the 20th imam by the Mustaali Ismaili Shi'a sect
- Amir Abdur-Rahim (1981–2024), American basketball coach
- Amir Khosrow Afshar (1919–1999), Iranian diplomat
- Amir Ali (disambiguation), several people
- Amir Amini (academic) (born 1965), American academic
- Amir Amini (basketball) (born 1984), Iranian basketball player
- Amir Bageria (born 2000), Canadian actor
- Amir Bagheri (born 1978), Iranian chess grandmaster
- Amir Bell (born 1996), American basketball player in the Israel Basketball Premier League
- Amir Blumenfeld (born 1983), American-Israeli comedian/actor
- Ameer Bux Bhutto (born 1954), Pakistani politician
- Amir Celestin (born 1990), American basketball player
- Amir Khasru Mahmud Chowdhury (born 1949), politician and government minister
- Amir Coffey (born 1997), American basketball player
- Amir Derakh, American musician
- Amir Eshel (born 1959), Commander in Chief of the Israeli Air Force
- Amir Farshad Ebrahimi (born 1975), former member of Ansar-e Hezbollah and currently a peace and human rights activist living in Germany
- Amir Gal-Or (born 1962), Israeli businessman and the managing partner of Infinity Group
- Amir Ganiel (1963–2018), Israeli swimming champion and record holder
- Amir Ghalenoei (born 1963), Iranian football coach and former player
- Amir Haddad (born 1984), Israeli French singer and songwriter
- Amir Hamed (1962–2017), Uruguayan writer and translator of Lebanese descent
- Amir Hamza (disambiguation), several people
- Amir Hashemi (born 1966), Iranian footballer
- Amir Hatami (born 1966), commander-in-chief of the Iranian Army
- Amir Mirza Hekmati, American alleged CIA operative
- Amir Hinton (born 1997), American basketball player
- Amir-Abbas Hoveyda (1919–1979), Iranian economist and politician
- Amir Jangoo (born 1997), Trinidad and Tobago and West Indies cricket player
- Amir Johnson (born 1987), American basketball player
- Amir Mahdi Jule (born 1980), Iranian screenwriter and actor
- Amir Karara (born 1977), Egyptian actor
- Amir Karić (born 1973), Bosnian-Slovenian footballer
- Amir Reza Khadem (born 1970), Iranian wrestler
- Amir Khan (disambiguation), several people
- Amir Khusrau (1253–1325), Indian musician, scholar and poet
- Amir Kror Suri (died 771), aka Jahan Pahlawan, Pashtun national history figure and a governor of Mandesh in Ghor
- Amir Husain Al-Kurdi, 16th-century Kurdish governor of Jeddah, admiral of Amir Mahdi Jule (born 1980), Iranian screenwriter and actorthe Mamluk fleet
- Amir Mohebbian (born 1962), Iranian politician, journalist and political analyst
- Amir Mohebi (born 1981), Iranian footballer
- Amir Mokri (born 1956), Iranian cinematographer
- Amir Muchtari (born 1972), Israeli basketball player
- Amir Muhammad (director) (born 1972), Malaysian film director and producer
- Amir Nachumi (born 1945), Israeli Air Force general
- Amir Naderi (born 1946), Iranian film director
- Amir Ohana (born 1976), Israeli politician
- Amir Peretz (born 1952), Moroccan-born Israeli politician
- Amir Hossein Rabii (1930–1979), Iranian Air Force commander
- Amir Sadollah (born 1980), American mixed martial arts fighter
- Amir Sarkhosh, Iranian snooker player
- Amir Siddiq (born 1997), American gridiron football player
- Amir Slama, Brazilian fashion designer
- Amir Spahić (born 1983), Bosnian footballer
- Ameer Speed (born 1999), American football player
- Amir Talai (born 1977), Iranian-American actor and singer
- Amir Tibon (born 1989), Israeli journalist
- Amir Vahedi (1961–2010), Iranian-born American professional poker player
- Amir Wilson (born 2004), British actor

=== Ameer ===
- Ameer Ali (disambiguation), several people
- Ameer Sultan (born 1967), Tamil film director
- Ameer Vann (born 1996), former member of boy band Brockhampton
- Abdul Ameer Yousef Habeeb, Iraqi journalist
- Amir Shurush (born 1984), Arab Israeli comedian

=== Fictional characters ===
- Amir, the protagonist in The Kite Runner
- Amir Kaffarov, an antagonist in Battlefield 3, a 2011 video game
- Amir Kazim, in A Wedding (Noces), a 2016 film
- Amir Beckett in Warframe, a 2013 video game

== Middle name ==
- Khalid Amir Khan (1934–2020), Pakistani diplomat and politician
- Mohammad Amir Khan (disambiguation), several people
- Syed Ameer Ali (1849–1928), Indian scholar who taught at Aligarh Muslim University
- Tengku Amir Hamzah (1911–1946), Indonesian poet
- Tamino (musician) (born 1996), Belgian-Egyptian singer, songwriter and musician

== Surname ==
- Anjali Ameer (born 1995), Indian film and television actress
- Eldad Amir (born 1961), Israeli Olympic competitive sailor
- Eli Amir (born 1937), Israeli writer
- Menashe Amir (born 1939), Iranian-born Israeli Persian-language broadcaster
- Mohammad Amir (born 1992), Pakistani cricketer banned for spot-fixing
- Nina Amir (born 1999), Israeli Olympic sports sailor
- Yigal Amir (born 1970), assassin of Prime Minister of Israel Yitzhak Rabin
- Zaïd Amir (born 2002), Comorian footballer
- Zainab Abdul Amir, Bahraini politician and journalist

=== Fictional characters ===
- Yusuf Amir, a character from the Grand Theft Auto game series

== See also ==
- Amir (disambiguation)
- Amiri (surname)
- Emir (disambiguation)
- Emir (name)
- Aamir (given name)
- Almir (given name)
- Amer (name)
- Amira (name), female version
- Aamir (disambiguation)
- Hammira
- Mirza
