= Amiri (disambiguation) =

Amiri is an Iranian-American luxury fashionhouse.

Amiri may refer to:

== People ==
- Amiri (surname)
- Amiri Baraka (1934–2014), American writer

== Places ==
- Amiri, Bushehr, a village in Bushehr Province, Iran
- Amiri-ye Olya, a village in Chaharmahal and Bakhtiari Province, Iran
- Amiri-ye Sofla, a village in Chaharmahal and Bakhtiari Province, Iran
- Amiri, Kermanshah, a village in Kermanshah Province, Iran
- Amiri, Aden Protectorate, South Arabia

== Other uses ==
- Amiri decree, the decree of an Emir or his representatives
- Amiri Hospital, a general hospital in Kuwait City
- Amiri Press in Bulaq, Cairo
- Amiri (typeface), a naskh-based Arabic typeface

== See also ==
- al-Amiri (disambiguation)
- Amir (disambiguation)
