= Amira (name) =

- Pronunciation: Arabic: [ʔa.ˈmiː.ra]
- Gender: Female
- Language: Arabic, Persian, Hebrew, Pashto, Urdu

Origin
- Meaning: Princess
- Region of origin: Arabia, Iran, Israel

Other names
- Alternative spelling: Ameera, Ameerah, Amirah, Emira
- Related names: Amir, Amer, Emir

Amira (أميرة ʾamīrah) is a feminine name meaning princess, commander, or ruler. It is the female version of the masculine name Amir. Both names are derived from the Arabic word Emir: أمير.

In the Balkans, Amira is popular among Bosniaks in the former Yugoslav nations.

== Given name ==
=== Ameera ===
- Ameera Lee (born 1974), Australian Paralympic archer
- Ameera al-Taweel (born 1983), former Saudi princess

=== Ameerah ===
- Princess Ameerah of Brunei (born 2008), Bruneian princess
- Ameerah (singer) (born 1983), Belgian-Tunisian singer
- Ameerah Bello (born 1975), American Virgin Islander sprinter
- Ameerah Falzon-Ojo (born 2002), British actress
- Ameerah Haq, Bangladeshi United Nations official

=== Amira ===
- Amira Abdelrasoul, Canadian researcher and associate professor
- Amira Aisya Abdul Aziz, Malaysian politician
- Amira Mohamed Ali, German politician
- Amira Ben Amor, Tunisian long-distance runner
- Amira Arfaoui, Swiss footballer
- Amira Ben Chaabane, Tunisian sabre fencer
- Amira Bouraoui, French-Algerian political activist
- Amira Charfeddine, Tunisian novelist
- Amira Bennison, aka Kate Bennison, British historian of the Middle East
- Amira Casar, French actress
- Amira Daugherty, American singer and rapper
- Amira Nur al-Din (1925–2020), Iraqi poet
- Amira Dotan, Israeli military figure, politician, former member of Knesset
- Amira Edrahi, Libyan swimmer
- Amira El Fadil (born 1967), Sudanese government official
- Amira Elghawaby, Canadian journalist, communications professional, and human rights activist
- Amira Griselda Gómez, Mexican politician
- Amira Osman Hamed, Sudanese women's rights activist
- Amira Hass, Israeli journalist and author
- Amira Hess, Iraqi-born Israeli poet and artist
- Amira Ismail, Maldivian actress
- Amira Kandil, Egyptian modern pentathlete
- Amira Khatun, Seljuk princess, daughter of sultan Ahmad Sanjar, and wife of Abbasid caliph al-Mustarshid
- Amira Kheris, Algerian canoeist
- Amira Kouza, Algerian swimmer and triathlete
- Amira Medunjanin, female singer from Bosnia and Herzegovina
- Amira Nowaira, Egyptian academic, translator, columnist and author
- Amira Oron, Israeli diplomat and ambassador to Egypt
- Amira Rasheed, British singer
- Amira Rasool, American entrepreneur and fashion journalist
- Amira de la Rosa (1895–1974), Colombian playwright, poet, journalist, and writer
- Amira Spahić, Bosnian footballer
- Amira Sartani, Israeli politician, former member of Knesset
- Amira El Sayed, Austrian actress and author
- Amira Selim, Egyptian soprano and opera singer
- Amira Willighagen, Dutch singer
- Amira Yahyaoui, Tunisian entrepreneur, blogger and human rights activist
- Amira Yoma (born 1952), Argentina political advisor and restaurateur
- Amira Virgil, American gaming content creator and activist

=== Amirah ===
- Amirah Inglis (1926–2015), Australian communist and writer
- Amirah Vann (born 1980), American actress

=== Emira ===
- Emira D'Spain (born 1996), Emirati-American model

== Middle name ==
- Khalil Amira El-Maghrabi (1914–1976), Egyptian boxer
- Safiyya Amira Shaikh (born 1983), British woman convicted of plotting to bomb St Paul's Cathedral

== Surname ==
- Efraim Amira (born 1949), Israeli football (soccer) player
- Ibn Amira (1186- 1258/60), or Ahmad ibn Abd Allah Ibn Amira, the 12th-century historian, poet, and scholar of law from al-Andalus during the reign of the Almohad dynasty
- Patricia Amira, Kenyan women's and girls' rights advocate

== Fictional characters ==
- Ameera Ali Aziz, a character on the television drama As the World Turns played by Tala Ashe
- Amira Masood, also Shah, fictional character from the BBC soap opera EastEnders played by Preeya Kalidas
- Emira Blight, a fictional character from the American animated television series The Owl House

== Other ==
- Hanan Ahmed Mohamed (born 1974), Egyptian singer who goes by the name Amira

== See also ==
- Emir
- Amira (disambiguation)
