= Al-Amiri =

Al-Amiri is a surname. Notable people with the surname include:

- Abu al-Hassan al-Amiri (died 992), Iranian Islamic philosopher in the Kindi tradition
- Hadi al-Amiri (born 1954), Iraqi politician and militia leader
- Najiha Al-Amiri (born 1956), Iraqi politician
- Saheb al-Amiri (died 2006), Muqtada al-Sadr's top aide, killed in a raid by U.S. troops

== See also ==
- Amiri (disambiguation)
