= Hacıalılar =

Hacıalılar may refer to:

- Hacıalılar, Gadabay, Azerbaijan
- Hacıalılar, Shamkir, Azerbaijan
