= Amir (disambiguation) =

Amir is a title of rulers or military leaders in many Muslim countries, alternatively written as Emir.

Amir or Ameer may also refer to:

== People ==
- Amir (name), people with the given name and surname Amir or Ameer
- Amir (singer) (born 1984), or Amir Haddad, Israeli-French singer
- Ameer (director), Indian film director

== Places ==
- Amir, Israel, a small community in northern Israel
- Əmir, a village in Azerbaijan
- Amir, East Azerbaijan, a village in Iran
- Amir, Sistan and Baluchestan, a village in Iran
- Amir-e Olya, a village in Iran
- Amir-e Sofla, a village in Iran
- Band-e Amir, a series of six deep blue lakes in Afghanistan
- Khan Amir, Lorestan, a village in Iran

== Arts, Entertainment, and media ==
- Ameer (film), a 1954 Indian film
- Amir, the main character in Khaled Hosseini's 2003 novel The Kite Runner
- Amir, a character in the television series Succession
- Amira (film), a 2026 Philippine film

== Ships ==
- Ameer class escort carrier
- HMS Ameer (D01), a British warship
- SS Amir, a Kuwaiti coastal tanker

== Titles ==
- Amir al-Mu'minin, an Arabic title usually translated "Leader of the Faithful
- Amir Arsalan, the full title Amir Arsalan -e Namdar, 19th-century popular Persian legend
- Amir (Iranian Army), a title for high-ranking officers
- Ameer of Bangladesh Jamaat-e-Islami – Political party in Bangladesh

== See also ==
- Amiri (disambiguation)
- Aamir (disambiguation)
- Ameer (disambiguation)
- Emir (disambiguation)
- Amira (disambiguation)
- Ameera (disambiguation)
- Hammira (disambiguation)
- Ami (disambiguation)
- Admir, a Bosnian given name
- Almir (given name)
