= Elmira =

Elmira may refer to:

== Places ==
=== Canada ===
- Elmira, Ontario, an unincorporated community
- Elmira, Prince Edward Island, an unincorporated community

=== United States ===
- Elmira, California, a census-designated place
- Elmira, Idaho, an unincorporated community
- Elmira, Indiana, an unincorporated community
- Elmira, Michigan, an unincorporated community
- Elmira, Missouri, a village
- Elmira, New York, a city
  - Elmira Correctional Facility
  - Elmira College
  - Elmira Corning Regional Airport
  - Elmira Pioneers, a baseball team
  - Elmira Prison, American Civil War POW camp
- Elmira (town), New York, a town next to the city
- Elmira, Oregon, an unincorporated community

== Persons ==
- Elmira (name), a given name (Elmira, Elmyra)
- A reference to Elmyr de Hory as "the Great Elmyra" in the Punk rock song No More Heroes by The Stranglers
- Elvira

== See also ==
- Elmira (gastropod), genus of gastropods
- Elmira Township (disambiguation)
- Almira (disambiguation)
