= Aamir (given name) =

Aamir (Urdu: عامر, pronounced [ˈaːmɪr]) is a given name, a variant spelling of the Arabic name Amer, common to the cultures of the Indian subcontinent. Notable people with the name include:

- Aamir Ageeb (1969–1999), Sudanese political activist
- Aamir Uddin Ahmod, politician
- Aamir Ali (born 2002), Pakistani cricketer
- Aamir Ali, Indian television actor
- Aamir Aziz (born 1990), Indian cricketer
- Aamir Bashir, Indian actor, film producer, and director
- Aamir Gani (born 1996), Indian cricketer
- Aamir Ghaffar (born 1979), English badminton player
- Aamir Hall (born 2001), American football player
- Aamir Raza Husain (born 1957), Indian theatre actor and director
- Aamir Liaquat Hussain (born 1971), former State Minister of Pakistan for religious affairs
- Aamir Kaleem (born 1981), Omani cricketer
- Aamir Khan (born 1965), Indian actor, film director and producer
- Aamir Atlas Khan (born 1990), Pakistani squash player
- Aamir Mehmood Kiani, Pakistani politician
- Aamir Latif, Afghani politician
- Aamir Rashadi Madni, Indian politician
- Aamir Peerzada (born 1991), Kashmiri journalist, documentary filmmaker, and author
- Aamir Hayat Khan Rokhri (1956–2011), Pakistani politician
- Aamir Saleem, Pakistani singer, composer, songwriter, host, and music video director
- Aamir J. Sheikh (born 1970), Norwegian-Pakistani politician
- Aamir Sheraz, bass guitarist in the Pakistani rock band, Jal
- Aamir Simms (born 1999), American basketball player
- Aamir Yousuf, Pakistani TV director, producer, writer, and actor
- Aamir Zaki (1968–2017), Pakistani guitar player

== See also ==
- Aamir (disambiguation)
- Amer (name)
- Almir (given name)
- Amir (disambiguation)
- Amir (name)
