= Emira =

Emira may refer to:

- Emira (name), an alternate spelling of the name "Amira"
- Emira Island, an island in Papua New Guinea
- Lotus Emira, a British sportscar
- Emira D'Spain, Emirati-American model

== See also ==
- Emir, title of high office in the Muslim world
