= Amiri-ye Pain =

Amiri-ye Pain (Persian: اميري پائین) may refer to:

- Amiri-ye Pain, Chaharmahal and Bakhtiari
- Amiri-ye Pain, Lorestan
