= Emir (disambiguation) =

Emir is a title of rulers or military leaders in many Muslim countries. Alternative spellings are Amir and Ameer.

Emir may also refer to:

- Emir (film), a 2010 Philippine film
- Emir (grape), a grape variety of Turkey
- Emir (name)
- Emir (singer) (born 1980), Turkish pop singer
- Emir (storm), a 2023 storm
- Emir, an album by Cem Adrian
- Əmir, a village in Azerbaijan
- European Market Infrastructure Regulation, a major body of securities market regulation for the European Union

== See also ==
- Amir (disambiguation)
- Ameer (disambiguation)
- Amira (disambiguation)
- Hammira (disambiguation)
