= Atasagun =

Atasagun is a Turkic word referring to the chief physician. The word is used in Mahmud al-Kashgari's Dīwān Lughāt al-Turk with this meaning. It began to be used as a surname when Turkification attempts started shortly after the foundation of the Republic of Turkey.

Notable people with the surname are as follows:

- İbrahim Şevki Atasagun (1899–1984), Turkish soldier and statesman
- Şenkal Atasagun (born 1941), Turkish civil servant
