= Admir =

Male given name

- Gender: Male

Other gender
- Feminine: Admira

Origin
- Meaning: Prince, ruler, commander, chief

Other names
- Related names: Amir

Admir is a male given name.

In the Balkans, Admir is popular among Bosniaks in the former Yugoslav nations. The name is a modification to the name Amir, and it holds the same meanings of prince, ruler, commander, and chief.

== Given name ==
- Admir Adrović, Montenegrin footballer
- Admir Adžem, Bosnian footballer
- Admir Aganović, Bosnian footballer
- Admir Bilibani, Bosnian footballer
- Admir Ćatović, Swedish footballer
- Admir Hasančić, Bosnian footballer
- Admir Haznadar, Bosnian-Dutch footballer
- Admir Ljevaković, Bosnian footballer
- Admir Mehmedi, Swiss footballer
- Admir Raščić, Bosnian footballer
- Admir Salihović, Bosnian footballer
- Admir Šarčević Bosnian footballer (retired)
- Admir Smajić, Bosnian footballer
- Admir Softić, Bosnian footballer
- Admir Teli, Albanian footballer
- Admir Velagić, Bosnian footballer
- Admir Vladavić, Bosnian footballer

== See also ==
- Admiral (disambiguation)
- Admire
- Almir (given name)
- Amir (disambiguation)
