= Almer (disambiguation) =

Almer is a village in Dorset, England.

Almer may also refer to:

- Almer (surname)
- Almer Township, Michigan, US

== See also ==
- Almere (disambiguation)
- Aylmer (disambiguation)
- Almir (given name)
