= Esmir =

Male given name

- Gender: Male

Other gender
- Feminine: Esmira

Origin
- Meaning: 'Prince, Ruler, Commander, Chief'

Other names
- Variant forms: Asmir; Ismir
- Related names: Emir

Esmir is a Bosnian masculine given name.

In the Balkans, Esmir is popular among Bosniaks in the former Yugoslav nations. The name is a modification to the name Emir, and it holds the same meanings of prince, ruler, commander, and chief.

== Given name ==
- Esmir Ahmetović (born 1991), Bosnian footballer
- Esmir Bajraktarević (born 2005), Bosnian footballer
- Esmir Džafić (born 1967), Bosnian retired footballer
- Esmir Hoogendoorn (born 1969), Dutch former professional tennis player
