= Amer (name) =

- Gender: Male
- Language: Arabic

Other gender
- Feminine: Amera

Origin
- Meaning: "One who lives a long and prosperous life"

Other names
- Related names: Amir, Amar

Amer is male given name.

In the Balkans, Amer is popular among Bosniaks in the former Yugoslav nations. The name is a modification to the name Amir (عامر), which means "one who lives a rich and prosperous life" in Arabic. This region also has a female equivalent: Amera.

== Given name ==
- Amer Alwan (1957–2023), Iraqi French film director
- Amer Bekić (born 1992), Bosnian footballer
- Amer Đidić (born 1994), Canadian-Bosnian footballer
- Amer Delić (born 1982), Bosnian tennis player
- Amer Ghalib (born 1979), American politician
- Amer Gojak (born 1997), Bosnian footballer
- Aamer Hayat (born 1982), Pakistani cricketer
- Amer Jukan (born 1978), Slovene-Bosnian
- Amer Ordagić (born 1993), Bosnian footballer
- Amer Osmanagić (born 1989), Bosnian footballer
- Amer Mohammad Rashid (born 1939), Iraqi general
- Amer Sabah (born 1982), Jordanian footballer

=== Middle name ===
- Abdul Nasir bin Amer Hamsah, Singaporean criminal and prisoner
- Mohamed Amer Al-Malky (born 1962), Omani athlete
- Musa Amer Obaid (born 1985), Qatari athlete

== Surname ==
- Abdel Hakim Amer (1919–1967), Egyptian general
- Ayten Amer (born 1976), Egyptian actress
- Baser Amer (born 1992), Filipino basketball player
- Bree Amer (born 1982), Australian television personality
- Ghada Amer (born 1963), Egyptian painter
- Kareem Amer (born 1984), Egyptian blogger
- Lindsay Amer, American YouTuber and LGBTQ activist
- Nicholas Amer (1923–2019), British actor

== See also ==
- Aamir (given name)
