= Ameera =

Ameera may refer to:

- USS Ameera (SP-453), a US Navy patrol vessel in commission from 1917 to 1919
- Ameera Ali Aziz, a character on the television drama As the World Turns
- Ameera al-Taweel (born 1983), Saudi Arabian princess and philanthropist
- Ameera Lee (born 1974), Australian Paralympic archer

== See also ==
- Amira (disambiguation)
