= Admirable =

Admirable may refer to:

- Admirable class minesweeper, the largest class of minesweepers the US Navy ordered during World War II
- USS Admirable (AM-136), the lead ship of her class
- French ship Admirable, several ships with the name
- HMS Admirable, a planned Amphion-class submarine, cancelled in 1945
- Admirable Campaign (Campaña Admirable), 1813 military action led by Simón Bolívar in Venezuela and Colombia

== See also ==
- Admire
- Admir, male given name
