= Carol Francischini =

Brazilian model (born 1989)

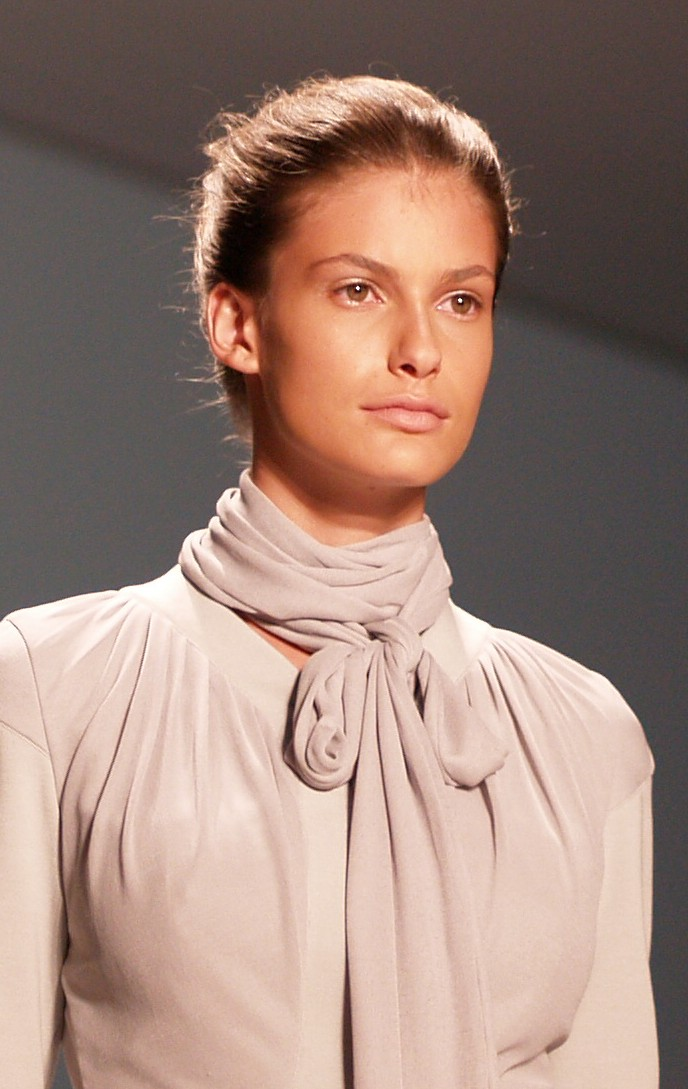
Francischini in 2006

Caroline Capovila Francischini (born April 4, 1989) is a Brazilian model. She walked for the fashion houses Ferragamo, Gucci, Fendi, and Max Mara, and worked for Victoria's Secret and Calvin Klein. She is among the models with the most appearances at São Paulo Fashion Week.

== Biography ==
Born in Valinhos, she began her modeling career at the age of thirteen after winning the Riachuelo Mega Model, a national modeling contest. She left elementary school and moved to New York, where she walked for brands such as Cartier, Diesel, and the designer Vera Wang. She appeared on the cover of the Brazilian and Argentine editions of Elle and did editorials for Nylon and Teen Vogue. She also worked in advertising campaigns for Tommy Hilfiger.

In 2009, she made an appearance on the television program TV Fama. She had a daughter in 2012. In 2013, she walked at Fashion Rio for the Brazilian fashion brand Oh, Boy!. In 2016, she participated in São Paulo Fashion Week, walking for the stylist Amir Slama.
