= Amir Amini =

Amir Amini may refer to:

- Amir Amini (academic) (born 1965), American academic
- Amir Amini (basketball) (born 1984), Iranian basketball player
