= Asmir =

Male given name

- Gender: Male

Other gender
- Feminine: Asmira

Origin
- Meaning: Prince, ruler, commander, chief

Other names
- Variant forms: Esmir; Ismir
- Related names: Amir

Asmir is a Bosnian masculine given name.

In the Balkans, Asmir is popular among Bosniaks in the former Yugoslav nations. The name is a modification to the name Amir, and it holds the same meanings of prince, ruler, commander, and chief.

Notable people with the name include:

- Asmir Avdukić, Bosnian footballer
- Asmir Begović, Bosnian footballer
- Asmir Ikanović, Bosnian footballer
- Asmir Kajević, Montenegrin footballer
- Asmir Kolašinac, Serbian shot putter
- Asmir Misini, Serbian footballer
- Asmir Suljić, Bosnian footballer

== See also ==
- Esmir
