= Ilmir =

Ilmir is a given name. Notable people with this name include the following:

- Ilmir Hazetdinov (born 1991), Russian ski jumper
- Ilmir Nurisov (born 1996), Russian footballer
- Ilmir Yakupov (born 1994), Russian footballer

== See also ==
- Almir (given name)
- Elmir
- Ilir (name)
