= Emir (name) =

- Gender: Male

Origin
- Origin: Arabic
- Meaning: command, order, prince, local king

Other names
- Variant form: Elmir
- Related names: Amir, Ameer

Emir is a male given name. It is derived from the Arabic title Emir or Amir. In Turkish, Emir means command, order, prince, local king.

In the Balkans, Emir is popular among Bosniaks in the former Yugoslav nations. The name is a modification to the name Amir. This region also has a female equivalent: Emira.

== Given name ==
- Emir (singer) (born 1980), Turkish pop singer
- Emir Batur Albayrak (born 2007), Turkish Olympian swimmer
- Emir Bekrić, Serbian hurdler
- Emir Işılay, Turkish musician
- Emir Kusturica, Serbian filmmaker
- Emir Lokmić, male alpine skier from Bosnia and Herzegovina
- Emir Mkademi, Tunisian football (soccer) player
- Emir Mutapčić (born 1960), Bosnian basketball player and coach
- Emir Preldžič, Turkish basketball player of Bosnian origin
- Emir Spahić, Bosnian football (soccer) player

== Honorific title ==
- Arslan family (Lebanon)
  - Emir Shakib Arslan
  - Emir Majid Arslan
  - Emir Faysal Arslan, son of Emir Majid Arslan
  - Emir Talal Arslan, son of Emir Majid Arslan
- Emir Fakhr-al-Din II
- Shihab family (Lebanon)
  - Emir Bashir I
  - Emir Bashir Shihab II
  - Emir Bashir III

== See also ==
- Amir (name)
- Amir (disambiguation)
- Emir (disambiguation)
- Emirate, a political territory that is ruled by a dynastic Muslim monarch styled emir. It also means principality.
