= Ian Turner (Australian political activist) =

Australian political activist (1922–1978)

Ian Alexander Hamilton Turner (1922–1978) was an Australian political activist, serving important roles in both the Communist Party of Australia and Australian Labor Party. As a leading historian, he wrote the book Industrial Labour and Politics, which examined the Australian labour movement.

== Early life ==
Ian Turner was born on 10 March 1922 at East Malvern, Melbourne. His parents were Francis Herbert Blackley Turner, a wheat farmer, and Nina Florence, née Lang. He attended Nhill State School, Geelong College, and the University of Melbourne (LL.B., 1948; B.A., 1949), where he was exposed to political debates on topics about the Spanish Civil War, fascism, and communism.

== Military service ==
In 1942, he served in the Australian Imperial Force (AIF) at various headquarters as a driver. After he was demoted from lance corporal to private for insubordination, he remained attached to headquarters, I Corps, as an acting corporal in the Australian Army Education Service. On 7 February 1945, he was discharged from the AIF, and later returned to university.

== Activism in the university ==
After military service, Turner returned to the University of Melbourne, where he became co-editor of the student union publication, Farrago, and joint-secretary of the Labour Club. He studied history and politics under Max Crawford, Percy Partridge and Manning Clark. Marxism became highly influential to his thought, while he began his lifelong exploration of the left in Australian politics and society. He met Amirah Gust at university; they married in 1947, had three children, and divorced in 1961, Amirah later becoming the writer Amirah Inglis.

He spent remarkable years with the Communist Party. He became secretary of Australian Peace Council in 1949, the organised anti-war conferences in Australia. Later, the Communist Party gave him "proletarian industrial experience" as a railway cleaner, where he became part of the Australian Railways Union. After finding his expectations "absurdly romantic", the railway sacked him in 1952. During the Soviet Union's suppression of the Hungarian uprising in 1956, he protested against it, particularly the execution of then Hungarian premier Imre Nagy. This opposition led to his expulsion from the Communist Party in 1958.

Despite his expulsion, Turner was a committed communist. In a special issue of Overland in 1956, he wrote to W. J. Brown that while criticism was essential in a living, vigorous party, it often came to be "only criticism of the means of fulfilling an already decided policy". What was most important was that it should not become "a substitute for serious discussion of basic questions of our policy and our theory ... we've all got a stake in our party and the sort of future it's trying to build in Australia".

== As a historian ==
Turner took Ph.D. studies in the Research School of Social Sciences, Australian National University (Ph.D., 1963). In his thesis he examined crucial questions surrounding the labour movement eastern Australia during the period 1900–1921. This thesis later was developed into his most important intellectual work, Industrial Labour and Politics. Moreover, the book focused on the internal politics surrounding the labour movement, as well as its most important moments, such as the general strike of 1917, and the split of the Labour Party over conscription.
