= Admire =

Admire may refer to:

- Racehorses owned by Riichi Kondo, as well as his second wife Junko, using the "Admire" crown name:
  - Admire Aura
  - Admire Cozzene
  - Admire Groove
  - Admire Japan
  - Admire Jupiter
  - Admire Mars
  - Admire Moon
  - Admire Rakti
  - Admire Terra
  - Admire Vega
  - Admire Zoom
- Admire, Kansas, a city in Lyon County, Kansas
- Admire, Pennsylvania, an unincorporated community in York County, Pennsylvania
- Admire Kasi, a Zimbabwean music producer and promoter

== See also ==
- Admirable
