= Mehdi Guliyev =

Soviet Azerbaijani lieutenant colonel of Internal Troops (1923–1976)

Mehdi Nadir oglu Guliyev
- Mehdi Nadir oğlu Quliyev
- Born: 15 May 1923; Heriknaz, Azerbaijan SSR, Soviet Union
- Died: 25 January 1976 (aged 52); Baku, Azerbaijan SSR, Soviet Union
- Military career
- Allegiance: Soviet Union
- Branch: Red Army (1942–46); Internal Troops
- Service years: 1942–1946 (Red Army)
- Rank: Lieutenant colonel (Internal Troops)
- Unit: 2nd Guards Rifle Division
- Conflicts: World War II; Battle of the Caucasus; Kerch-Eltigen Operation
- Awards: Hero of the Soviet Union; Order of Lenin; Order of the Red Star (2)

Mehdi Nadir oglu Guliyev (Azerbaijani: Mehdi Nadir oğlu Quliyev; 15 May 1923 – 25 January 1976) was an Azerbaijani Internal Troops lieutenant colonel and a Hero of the Soviet Union. Guliyev was awarded the title on 17 November 1943 for his actions in the Battle of the Caucasus and the Kerch–Eltigen Operation. During the battle to break through the Blue Line, Guliyev was reported to have repulsed twelve German counterattacks and killed 167 German soldiers with his machine gun. During the Taman Offensive he reportedly destroyed two German machine guns with grenades. In the Kerch–Eltigen Operation, Guliyev reportedly killed about 100 German soldiers with his machine gun. Postwar, Guliyev served in the Internal Troops, reaching the rank of lieutenant colonel.

== Early life ==
Guliyev was born on 15 May 1923 in Heriknaz to a servant's family. He graduated from ninth grade and trade school. He worked as a bricklayer in Baku and was a Komsomol member.

== World War II ==
Guliyev was drafted into the Red Army in May 1942. He became a machine gun commander in the 15th Guards Rifle Regiment of the 2nd Guards Rifle Division. Guliyev fought in combat from August. In August and September, German troops reached the Baksan River, defended by the division, then part of the 37th Army. The division fought in battles to stop the German advance. Guliyev fought in the division's counterattack towards Zayukovo, during which German troops reportedly suffered heavy losses. On 25 October 1942, German troops advanced out of their bridgehead on the Terek River towards Nalchik. The German troops reportedly attacked the positions of the division with 100 tanks, supported by infantry. The tanks penetrated into the Soviet lines and the division retreated into the foothills of the Greater Caucasus. The German troops captured Nalchik and Ordzhonikidze. Before 1943, Guliyev helped defend the Urukh River with his division.

In January 1943, the German troops began to retreat. The division fought in the recapture of Nalchik. Between February and May Soviet troops unsuccessfully attempted to break through the German Blue Line. Intense fighting took place near the villages of Kievskoye and Moldavanskoye in Krymsky District. On 27 May Guliyev fought in the battle to break through the Blue Line near the Gorishny farm. The unit captured the village. Guliyev reportedly repulsed nine counterattacks. His crew was reportedly killed during the fighting and Guliyev took over the gun. During the eighth counterattack Guliyev was reportedly wounded in the face, but he did not leave the front. After repulsing the ninth counterattack Guliyev lost consciousness. He had reportedly killed 187 German soldiers.

The division advanced in September. On a new defensive line, the German troops stopped the advance on 15 September. The regiment was unable to dislodge the German troops, and the regiment had to seek cover amidst heavy machine gun fire. Guliyev reportedly spotted three camouflaged machine-gun positions. He moved closer to the pillboxes and killed the crew of one. Taking grenades, he reportedly destroyed the other two pillboxes. The regiment was able to advance after the destruction of the pillboxes. Guliyev received the Order of the Red Star for this engagement. On 16 October Guliyev was awarded a second Order of the Red Star for his actions on 2 October. The division fought in the Kerch-Eltigen Operation in November 1943. On 1 November, the unit landed on the Kerch Peninsula and captured Height 175. German troops made several counterattacks. Guliyev reportedly killed 25 German soldiers with his machine gun on the first day. He reportedly killed a total of about 100 German soldiers during the operation. On 17 November, Guliyev was awarded the title Hero of the Soviet Union and the Order of Lenin.

In 1944, Guliyev graduated from the Krasnodar Small Arms and Mortar School with the rank of junior lieutenant. Guliyev was sent to a reserve regiment and graduated from the Tbilisi officers' improvement courses in 1945.

== Postwar ==
Guliyev left the army in 1946. He became a Communist Party of the Soviet Union member in the same year. He lived in Baku. In 1948, he graduated from the Higher Party School of the Azerbaijan Communist Party Central Committee. He worked in the Ministry of Internal Affairs, reaching the rank of lieutenant colonel. Guliyev died on 25 January 1976 and was buried in Baku.
