= Amirah Inglis =

Australian communist and author

Amirah Inglis (née Gutstadt, then Gust, then Turner, finally Inglis) (7 December 1926 – 2 May 2015) was an Australian communist activist and writer.

== Biography ==
Inglis was born Amirah Gutstadt in 1926 in Brussels, Belgium, to Itzhak (also known as Isaac) and Manka (also known as Miriam) Gutstadt, who were Polish Jews. Prior to her birth, her parents had lived in Mandatory Palestine, and it was there that the Hebrew name Amirah had been suggested. At the age of two, Inglis and her mother travelled to Melbourne, Australia, to join her father there. He had adopted a new surname, Gust. For most of her childhood she was an only child: her only sibling, Ian Gust, was 14 years younger.

After schooling at Princes Hill State School and Mac.Robertson Girls' High School, she studied history at Melbourne University. It was there that she both joined the Communist Party, and met her first husband, Ian Turner, with whom she went on to have three children. She was editor of the student newspaper, Farrago, in 1944. In 1947 she was vice-president of the Students' Representative Council; Ian Turner was the president.

After university, she worked as a librarian, first with the Department of Transport and then with the Communist Party's Melbourne newspaper, the Guardian. In 1959 she and her husband and their three children moved from Melbourne to Canberra, where Ian Turner took up a PhD scholarship at the Australian National University, and where Amirah Turner taught music at the new Lyneham High School. That same year Amirah Turner wrote the music for the new school song.

In 1961 Amirah Turner left the Communist Party (Ian Turner having already been expelled); the marriage came to an end the same year. She met the historian Ken Inglis in Canberra and they married in 1965. In 1967 Ken Inglis became vice-chancellor of the University of Papua New Guinea, and Amirah (by then Amirah Inglis) and five of their combined six children went with him. It was in Port Moresby that she started to write, starting with an article for the journal Nation, although she had previously written a short story for the communist newspaper Tribune in 1956, under her then married name of Turner. Her first book was about sexual politics in Port Moresby in the 1920s and 30s. On Ken Inglis's retirement from UPNG in 1975 they returned to Canberra, where they lived until 2007, when they moved to Melbourne. Inglis died in 2015, and Ken Inglis died in 2017.

== Works ==
- Not a White Woman Safe, (1974: ANU Press).
- The White Women's Protection Ordinance: Sexual Anxiety and Politics in Papua, (1975: Sussex University Press).
- Karo: The Life and Fate of a Papuan, (1983: Institute of Papua New Guinea Studies in Association with ANU Press).
- Australians in the Spanish Civil War, (1987: Allen & Unwin).
- Amirah, An un-Australian Childhood, (1989: William Heinemann Australia).
- The Hammer & Sickle and the Washing Up, (1995: Hyland House).

Inglis also edited a book of letters from an Australian, Frederick John Lloyd Edmonds (1906-1994) who had fought in Spain as part of the International Brigades during the Spanish Civil War: Edmonds, Lloyd, Letters from Spain, (1985: George Allen & Unwin). When Edmonds unveiled the Spanish Civil War Memorial in Canberra in 1993, the Spanish ambassador was delighted to meet an Australian who had fought on the same side as his parents.
