= Dīwān Lughāt al-Turk =

Earliest known dictionary of Turkic Languages

Dīwān Lughāt al-Turk ديوان لغات الترك
- Nation's Library
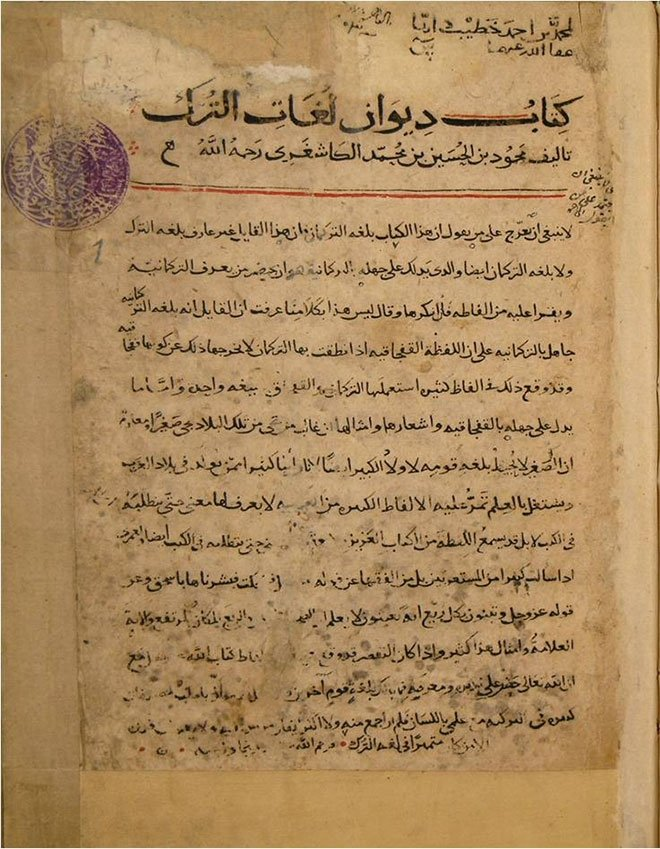
- The only known surviving manuscript copy of the book, copied in 1266 in Damascus.
- Also known as: Compendium of the languages of the Turks
- Type: Dictionary
- Date: 1072–1074
- Place of origin: Baghdad
- Languages: Arabic; Khaqani Turkic
- Author: Mahmud al-Kashgari
- Patron: Kara-Khanid Khanate
- Dedicated to: Abbasid caliphs
- Script: Arabic script
- Contents: Comprehensive dictionary of Turkic languages
- Exemplar: One
- Previously kept: National Library of Turkey
- Discovered: Ali Amiri

The Dīwān Lughāt al-Turk (Arabic: ديوان لغات الترك; translated to English as the Compendium of the languages of the Turks) is the first comprehensive dictionary of Turkic languages, compiled between 1072 and 1074 by the Kara-Khanid scholar Mahmud al-Kashgari, who extensively documented the Turkic languages of his time.

== Importance ==
Dīwān Lughāt al-Turk was intended for use by the caliphs of Baghdad, who were controlled by the Seljuk Turks. It has a map that shows countries and regions from Japan (Cabarka / Jabarka) to Egypt. The book also included the first known map of the areas inhabited by Turkic peoples. The book was dedicated to Abu'l-Qasim Abdullah in Baghdad in 1077. The manuscript has 638 pages, and about 7500 Turkish words explained in the Arabic language.

The compendium documented evidence of Turkic migration and the expansion of the Turkic tribes and Turkic languages into Central Asia, Eastern Europe and West Asia, mainly between the 6th and 11th centuries. The region of origin of the Turkic people is suggested to be somewhere in Siberia and Mongolia. By the 10th century most of Central Asia was settled by Turkic tribes such as Tatar, Kipchaks, Türkmen, etc. The Seljuq dynasty settled in Anatolia starting in the 11th century, ultimately resulting in permanent Turkic settlement and presence there. Meanwhile, other Turkic tribes either ultimately formed independent nations, such as Kyrgyzstan, Turkmenistan, Uzbekistan and Kazakhstan, and others new enclaves within other nations, such as Chuvashia, Bashkortostan, Tatarstan, the Crimean Tatars, the Uyghurs in China, and the Sakha Republic in Siberia.

== Content ==
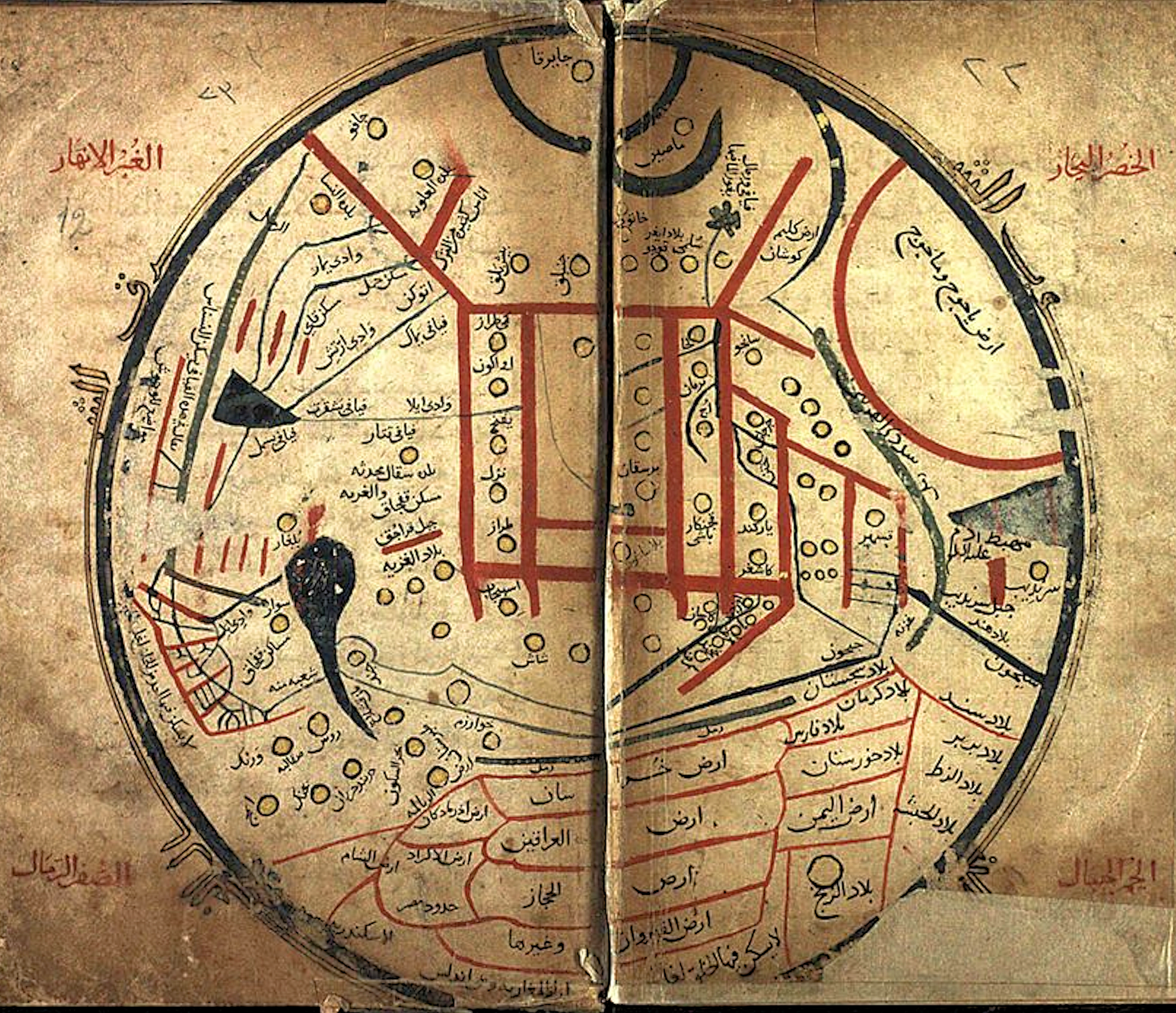
Early world map from Dīwān Lughāt al-Turk

Mahmud al-Kashgari's comprehensive dictionary, later edited by the Turkish historian, Ali Amiri, contains specimens of old Turkic poetry in the typical form of quatrains of Persian literature (Azerbaijani: dördəm, Persian رباعیات ruba'i; Turkish: dörtlük), representing all the principal genres: epic, pastoral, didactic, lyric, and elegiac.

The words from Dīwān Lughāt al-Turk were used during the Turkification attempts shortly after the foundation of the Republic of Turkey, including atasagun.

Two main Turkic dialects were emphasized in the work. One of these is Khaqani Turkic, which is described as the "most subtle and elegant of the Turkic dialects", and the other is Oghuz (Western) Turkic, which is defined as "the easiest of the Turkic dialects". Although the book focuses on Khaqani Turkic, an important place is also given to Oghuz Turkic. The number of words taken as headings in the book is around 8,000. Accordingly, there are 185 words from the Oghuz dialect, 45 from the Kipchak dialect, 39 from the Chigil dialect, 36 from the Argu dialect, 23 from the Yagma dialect, 13 from the Kençek dialect, 7 from the Tuhsi, 4 from the Suvar, each two 2 from the Khotan, Yabaku, and Kay dialects were recorded.

== Location ==
It has been previously housed at the National Public Library in Istanbul, and later in the Millet Manuscript Library (Millet Yazma Kütüphanesi), with inventory number Arabi Kit. 4189. As of February 2020 it is on display at the Presidential Library in Ankara.

== Recognition ==
In 2017 the manuscript was added to the UNESCO Memory of the World international register, which lists documentary heritage of global importance.

== See also ==
- Kutadgu Bilig, another book in Karakhanid dated to the 11th century
