= Amir Hamza =

Amir Hamza may refer to:

- Amir Hamza (cricketer) (born 1991), Afghan cricketer
- Amir Hamza (poet), Bangladeshi poet
- Hamza ibn Abd al-Muttalib, the prophet Mohammed's uncle
  - Dastan-e-Amir Hamza, an Islamic legend about him
- Amir Hamza (Lashkar-e-Taiba), a leader of the group Lashkar-e-Taiba
- Amir Hamza (Nuristan), a delegate to Afghanistan's Constitutional Loya Jirga
- Amir Hamza I, utsmi of Kaitags in 1595–1608/09
- Amir Hamza II, utsmi of Kaitags in 1696–1706
- Amir Hamza III, utsmi of Kaitags in 1751–1787

== See also ==
- Amir Hamja, New York Times photojournalist
- Ameer Hamza (born 1995), Pakistani cricketer
- Ameer Hamza Shinwari (1907–1994), Pashto-language poet
