= Almira (disambiguation) =

Almira is the first opera by George Frideric Handel, about and named after a fictitious Castilian queen in Valladolid.

Almira may also refer to :

== Places ==
- Almira, Ontario, Canada, a neighbourhood in Markham
- Almira Township, Michigan, US, a civil township
- Almira, Washington, US, a town

== People ==
=== Given name ===
- Almira Cercado, a member of the Filipino girl group 4th Impact
- Almira Edson (1803–1886), American folk artist
- Almira Hershey (1843–1930), American civic leader, businesswoman, property developer, hotelier and philanthropist
- Almira Hart Lincoln Phelps (1793-1884), American educator, author, editor
- Almira Hollander Pitman (1854–1939), American suffragist and women's rights activist
- Almira Russell, wife of Winfield Scott Hancock
- Almira Sessions (1888–1974), American character actress of stage, screen and television
- Almira Skripchenko, Moldovian-born French chess player

=== Surname ===
- Jacques Almira (born Jacques Schaetzle, 1950), French writer

== Other uses ==
- Almira College, a women's college, forerunner of Greenville University, Greenville, Illinois, US
- Miss Almira Gulch, a villain in the 1939 film The Wizard of Oz

== See also ==
- Almyros, an ancient city in Thessalia, Greece
- Elmira (disambiguation)
- Almir (given name)
- Amira (Egyptian singer), Egyptian singer
