= Kələman =

- Location within Azerbaijan
- Coordinates: 40°35′N 45°40′E
- Country: Azerbaijan
- Rayon: Gadabay
- Municipality: Poladlı
- Time zone: UTC+4 (AZT)
  - Summer (DST): UTC+5 (AZT)

Kələman (also, Kelaman) is a village in the Gadabay Rayon of Azerbaijan. The village forms part of the municipality of Poladlı.
