= Qozqaralı =

Human settlement in Azerbaijan

Coordinates: 40°35′N 45°43′E

Qozqaralı is a village in the municipality of Poladlı in the Gadabay Rayon of Azerbaijan.
