= Heriknaz =

- Location within Azerbaijan
- Coordinates: 40°36′N 45°41′E
- Country: Azerbaijan
- Rayon: Gadabay
- Municipality: Poladlı
- Time zone: UTC+4 (AZT)
  - Summer (DST): UTC+5 (AZT)

Heriknaz (also, Höriknaz and Eriknaz) is a village in the Gadabay Rayon of Azerbaijan. The village forms a part of the municipality of Poladlı.

== Notable natives ==
- Mehdi Guliyev — Hero of the Soviet Union.
