= Almir (given name) =

Male given name

- Gender: Male

Other gender
- Feminine: Almira

Origin
- Meaning: 'Prince, Ruler, Commander, Chief'

Other names
- Variant form: Elmir
- Related names: Amir

Almir is a Bosnian/Albanian masculine given name.

In the Balkans, Almir is popular among Bosniaks and Albanians in the former Yugoslav nations. The name is a modification to the name Amir, and it holds the same meanings of prince, ruler, commander, and chief.

It may refer to:

== Football ==
- Almir Aganspahić (born 1996), Bosnian-Herzegovinian footballer
- Almir Ajzeraj (born 1997), Kosovo Albanian footballer
- Almir Moraes Andrade (born 1973), Brazilian footballer
- Almir Bajramovski (born 1982), Macedonian football
- Almir Bekić (born 1989), Bosnian footballer
- Almir Ćubara (born 1997), Bosnian footballer
- Almir Gegić (born 1979), Serbian footballer
- Almir Gredić (born 1976), Bosnian footballer
- Almir Hurtić, Bosnian football player and coach
- Almir Kayumov (1964 – 2013), Russian football player and referee
- Almir Memić (footballer, born 1962), Bosnian football manager and former footballer
- Almir Memić (footballer, born 1975), Bosnian former footballer
- Almir Mukhutdinov (born 1985), Kazakhstani footballer
- Almir Pernambuquinho (1937 – 1973), Brazilian footballer
- Almir Pliska (born 1987), Bosnian footballer
- Almir Rahmanović (born 1986), Slovenian footballer
- Almir Soto (born 1994), Colombian footballer
- Almir Sulejmanović (born 1978), Slovenian footballer
- Almir Tanjič (born 1979), Slovenian footballer
- Almir Tolja (born 1964), Bosnian footballer
- Almir Turković (born 1970), Bosnian football player and coach
- Almir Lopes de Luna (born 1982), Brazilian footballer known as Almir

== Other sports ==
- Almir Aganović (born 1973), Bosnian volleyball player
- Almir Bentemps, Italian luger
- Almir Velagić (born 1981), Bosnian weightlifter
- Almir Nelson de Almeida (1923–1977), Brazilian basketball player known as Almir
- Almir dos Santos (born 1993), Brazilian athlete

== Other ==
- Almir Čehajić, Bosnian entertainer
- Almir Chediak (1950–2003), Brazilian music executive
- Almir Guineto stage name of Almir de Souza Serra (1946–2017), Brazilian music entertainer
- Almir Sater (born 1956), Brazilian entertainer

== See also ==
- Aamir (given name)
- Aamir (disambiguation)
- Admir
- Almer (disambiguation)
- Almira (disambiguation)
- Amir (disambiguation)
- Amir (name)
- Elmir
- Ilmir
