= Amir Hamza (Lashkar-e-Taiba) =

Pakistani Islamic militant (born 1959)

Personal details
- Born: 10 May 1959 (age 67) Sheikhupura, Punjab, Pakistan
- Party: Milli Muslim League
- Occupation: Theologist, alim and author
- Known for: Founding member of Lashkar-e-Taiba
- Organisation: Tehreek-e-Hurmat-e-Rasul Pakistan

Military service
- Allegiance: Lashkar-e-Taiba; Afghan mujahideen (1979–1992)
- Battles/wars: Soviet-Afghan war; Kashmir conflict; Insurgency in Jammu and Kashmir

Amir Hamza (born 10 May 1959) is a founding leader of the Islamist, Salafi jihadist militant group Lashkar-e-Taiba (LeT) based in Pakistan. He is regarded as its second most important leader, after Hafiz Saeed. Hamza was designated as a terrorist by the United States Treasury.

Described as "a fiery speaker and a prolific writer," he is also considered to be "the top LeT ideologue." Hamza is believed to sit on its Central Committee. He is said to have negotiated for the release of other leaders, and to have led LeT's campaigns for charitable donations, and to have been the founding editor of LeT's official publication Majallah al-Daawa.

In 2018, Hamza formed the Jaish-e-Manqafa as a fund-raising front for the LeT, due to a ban on the Jamat-ud-Dawa and Falah-e-Insaniat Foundation (other LeT fronts) by the Pakistani government, and continues to openly solicit for funds under that name in Pakistan.

== Assassination attempt ==
On 16 April 2026, around 8:30 a.m. PKT, Hamza survived an assassination in his car by two motorcycle-borne gunmen at Pindi Stop, Hamdard Chowk, PECO road in Kot Lakhpat, Lahore; being injured by a bullet in the arm. He had been returning home after recording the morning TV programme Noor-e-Sahar for City 42 as head of the Tehreek-e-Hurmat-e-Rasul Pakistan (THRP; lit. 'Movement for the Sanctity of the Prophet'). The attack was condemned by, the LeT front organisation, Pakistan Markazi Muslim League.

== Books ==
In 2002 Hamza published Qafila Da'wat aur Shahadat (Caravan of Proselytizing and Martyrdom). The head of LeT's publications division and the editor of many of its periodicals (like the monthly magazine Mujallah ad-Dawah), he is the author of the following books, among others:

- Toor-e-Kham Se Koh-e-Qaaf Tak — Roos Ke Taaqub Mein (From Torkhum to the Caucasus — Hotly Pursuing Russia)
- Shahrah-e-Bahisht (The Road to Paradise)
  - Fair, C. Christine, and Safina Ustaad, "Highway to Heaven by Amir Hamza", The Literature of Lashkar-e-Tayyaba: Deadly Lines of Control (translation, Oxford University Press, 2023)
- Afghanistan Ki Chuttiyo Par — Qafla Dawat o Jihad (On the Mountain Tops of Afghanistan — The Caravans of Call and Jihad).
- Mainey Bible Se Pucha Qur’an Kyun Jaley ? (I Asked the Bible Why the Qurans were Set Alight)
- Hindu Ka Hamdard (Hindu's Well Wisher)
- Kashmiri Aurat Aur Amrika (Kashmiri Woman and America)
- Khomeini Aur Kamal Ataturk Kay Iran Aur Turkey Mein Main Ney Kiya Dekha (What Did I See in Khomeini and Kemal Atatürk's Iran and Turkey?)
- Mazhabi Wa Siyasi Bavay (Religious and Political Leaders)
- Rawayyee Meray Hazoor Kay (My Prophet's Behaviour)
- Seerat Kay Suchay Moti (Real Pearls of the Prophet's Character)
