= Poladlı, Gadabay =

Poladlı
- Municipality
- Location within Azerbaijan
- Coordinates: 40°34′N 45°40′E
- Country: Azerbaijan
- Rayon: Gadabay

Population
  - Total: 1,363
- Time zone: UTC+4 (AZT)
  - Summer (DST): UTC+5 (AZT)

Poladlı (also, Poladı and Poladly) is a village and municipality in the Gadabay Rayon of Azerbaijan. It has a population of 1,363. The municipality consists of the villages of Poladlı, Qozqaralı, Əmir, Kələman, Hacıalılar, and Heriknaz.
