= Almere (disambiguation) =

Almere may refer to:

- Almere, a city in the Netherlands
- Almere Buiten, a district in Almere
- Almere Haven, the oldest part of Almere
- Almere Poort, a new district in Almere
- Almere Stad, a district in Almere
- Almere (lake), an early medieval name for the Zuiderzee

== See also ==
- Almer (disambiguation)
