= Modern Thinkers Party of Islamic Iran =

- General Secretary: Amir Mohebbian
- Founded: 2006; 20 years ago
- Headquarters: Tehran, Iran
- Ideology: Conservatism
- Political position: Far-right
- Religion: Islam

Website
- mtpii.com

Modern Thinkers Party of Islamic Iran (MTPII; Persian: حزب نواندیشان ایران اسلامی hezb-e novândišân-e Irân-e Eslâmi) is a conservative political party in Iran. It was co-founded in 2006 by Amir Mohebbian, Gholamhosein Mohammadi, and MPs Abolfazl Kalhor and Hosein Noushabadi.

It is considered a modernist and moderate party, supporting social justice and social freedom. The party advocated pro-poor policies and dialogue with the political elite.

According to Simon Tisdall, it is a right-wing traditionalist party.
