= Ayten Amer =

Egyptian actress

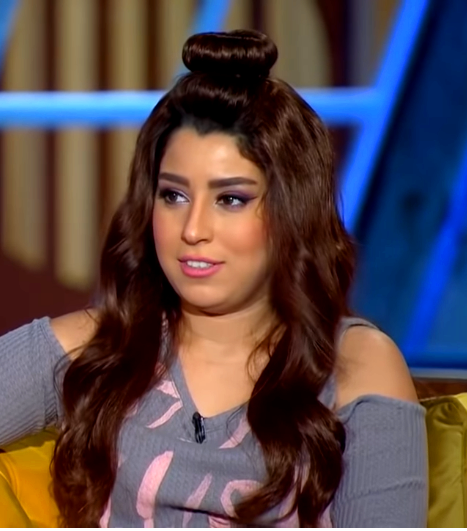
- Amer in 2020
- Born: Samar Ahmed Abd El Ghaffar Amer; November 22, 1976 (age 49); Alexandria, Egypt
- Occupations: Actress, model
- Years active: 2004–present
- Spouse: Mohammed Ezzelarab (m. 2015; div. 2022)
- Children: 1

Ayten Amer (Arabic: أيتن عامر) (born Samar Ahmed Abd El Ghaffar Amer, 22 November 1976, Alexandria, Egypt) is an Egyptian actress and model.

== Career ==
Amer moved to Cairo when she was four. She later studied acting and directing and worked as a model, which helped her overcome her fear of the camera. Her first major role was in Hadret El Motaham Aby (Mr. Guilty is My Father), with Nour El-Sherif.

== Personal life ==
Amer is the sister of actress Wafaa Amer, and has one daughter, Ayten Ezzelarab.

== Filmography ==
- Sukkar Mor
- Elleila Elkebira
- Zana'et Settat
- Salem Abu Okhto
- Betawqit Elqahera
- Cart Memory
- Ala Gothety
- Harag we Marag
- Hasal Kh'eer
- Sa3a we Nos
- Banat ElA'm
- Ya t'addi, Ya T-haddi

=== Series ===
- Shaqet Faisal
- Bein AL Sarayat
- Al Ahd (El Kalam El Mobah)
- El Boyoot Asrar
- Kika Alal Ali
- Elsabaa Wasaya
- Al Walida Basha
- El Zowga El Tanya
- Al Zoga Al Raba'a
- Keed El-Nesa
- Afrah
- Ayoub ramadan 2018
- 3anbar 6
- 7adret el motaham 2aby
