= Amir Mohebbian =

Leader of Modern Thinkers Party
- Incumbent
- Assumed office 1 July 2006
- Deputy: Gholamhassan Mohammadi
- Preceded by: Party created

Personal details
- Born: 23 June 1962 (age 64) Tehran, Iran
- Party: Modern Thinkers Party of Islamic Iran
- Spouse: Rika Hessami
- Education: Azad University

Amir Mohebbian (Persian: امیر محبیان), (born 23 June 1962 in Tehran, Iran) is an Iranian politician, journalist, professor of university and political analyst.

Mohebbian has Ph.D. in western philosophy and he is an Assistant Professor of University and a faculty member of Azad University as well. Mohebbian is well known as a strategist for the conservative camp in Iran.

== Education ==
Mohebbian studied Islamic studies in 1982, but in 1983 he went to Tehran University. He was educated in theology for one year, but changed the course of study and went on to study a degree in Western philosophy. He continued to doctorate degree.

== political behavior ==
Mohebbian political behavior based on rationalism and moderation. He has tried to rationalize the political behavior of conservatives. Most political observers in Iran and outside Iran have confirmed the analytical ability of Mohebbian . He has had significant political predictions in Iranian politics and Iranian diplomacy. Therefore, strategic studies centers in Europe and Asia are invited him to present his views.

For example, in Berlin, 14 May 2009, Amir Mohebbian met with members of the German Bundestag, representatives of the Federal Foreign Office, the Federal Chancellery as well as with associates of selected think tanks to discuss the role of the media in Iran. Moreover, the discussion focused on the upcoming presidential elections in Iran as well as on current questions of Iranian foreign policy. The Political Background Discussion with Amir Mohebbian was based on Körber Foundation's tradition of dialogue with Iran.

== Mohebbian As A Strategist ==
In a very Important analysis, Mohebbian wrote : Possible scenarios of war against Iran.

The official website of Supreme Leader Ali Khamenei published a commentary article titled "Possible scenarios of threat against Iran". The article, also published in the daily Resalat, was written by Dr. Amir Mohebbian, a top Iranian political commentator affiliated with the conservative camp. In light of the media discourse about a possible attack on Iran, the author of the article offers an in-depth analysis of three possible scenarios of an attack on Iran led by the United States and its allies, and estimates the likelihood of each.

Mohebbian argues that the main objective of the West is to topple the Iranian regime. Having tried and failed to achieve this objective through various means, it is now left with two options: weakening the regime to render it more vulnerable, and launching a military attack.

He details three possible scenarios of war against Iran: an all-out war of attrition combined with ground intervention, a limited war that includes action against the command centers of the regime and is aimed to promote political objectives, and a selective war against specific targets aimed to strip Iran of its offensive capabilities.

The political commentator goes into great detail about the severe problems involved in a military campaign against Iran in each of the three scenarios. It is his assessment that the third scenario (selective war against specific targets) is the most plausible of the three, but even the likelihood of this scenario is not particularly high due to several reasons, including the difficulty of attacking a large number of targets, the possibility of a selective war developing into an all-out war, the regional environmental consequences of an attack on nuclear facilities, and the inability of such an attack to impact Iran's scientific nuclear abilities.

Mohebbian argues that the military option is brought up by the West as part of a psychological warfare campaign aimed to achieve a number of objectives: testing Iran's reaction and the cohesion of the top echelon of its regime, mobilizing the support of Russia and China for sanctions against Iran, encouraging Arab countries to purchase American weapons to defend themselves against Iran, and forcing Iran into political concessions.

The author concludes the article with a discussion of Iran's response to the threats it has received, arguing that the well-coordinated reactions by top regime officials and all the country's political factions reveal the inadequacy of the American strategy. The commentator also argues that the Supreme Leader's public remarks concerning the military threats are aimed to send several important messages to the West: Iran will not yield to pressure, there is internal unity among the decision makers, Iran has no offensive intentions and poses no threat to any country in the region, and its policy is dependent on the policy of the other side. A reasonable policy by the United States will be met with a reasonable course of action, and any aggression will be met with a strong reaction.

== See also ==
- History of political Islam in Iran

Party political offices
Preceded by None	General Secretary of the Modern Thinkers Party of Islamic Iran; 2006–present	Succeeded by Incumbent
