= Amir, East Azerbaijan =

Amir امير
- Village
- Location within Iran
- Coordinates: 37°18′07″N 46°16′02″E
- Country: Iran
- Province: East Azerbaijan
- County: Maragheh
- Bakhsh: Central
- Rural District: Qareh Naz

Population (2006)
  - Total: 230
- Time zone: UTC+3:30 (IRST)
  - Summer (DST): UTC+4:30 (IRDT)

Amir (Persian: امير, also Romanized as Amīr; also known as Amīrābād and Amīr Qeshlaq) is a village in Qareh Naz Rural District, in the Central District of Maragheh County, East Azerbaijan Province, Iran. At the 2006 census, its population was 230, in 60 families.
