= Aamir Peerzada =

Indian journalist

- Born: 4 April 1991 (age 35); Bandipora, Jammu and Kashmir, India
- Occupations: Journalist, filmmaker & author
- Notable credit: Ramnath Goenka Award 2015, Redink Award 2016, Redink Award 2017, The Dark Hour: India Under Lockdowns

Aamir Peerzada is an Indian journalist, documentary filmmaker and an author. He is currently working with the BBC News, based out of Delhi and Srinagar. He has also worked with NDTV as a reporter and producer till March 2017. In 2015, he filmed a challenging journey to the top of Mount Everest during the April 2015 Nepal earthquake. The documentary Operation Everest – Summiteers to Saviours was later made using the footage recorded by Peerzada and his team. He has also produced documentary films Lighting the Himalayas and Siachen – Journey to the World's Highest Battlefield.

Peerzada has also been one of the authors for The Dark Hour: India Under Lockdowns, an anthology by Roli Books.

== Early life and education ==
Peerzada was born in 1991 in Kashmir, India. His father was killed by unknown gunmen in 2002.

Peerzada did his schooling from Jawaher Navodaya Vidyalaya Baramulla and then joined University of Kashmir for Bachelors in Science. He later studied Broadcast Journalism.

== Award and honours ==
- Ramnath Goenka Award for excellence in Journalism 2015
- Red Ink award 2016– Excellence in Indian Journalism under Sports category
- Red Ink award 2017– Excellence in Indian Journalism under Science and Innovation category

== Recent work ==
- (2015) Operation Everest – Summiteers to Saviours NDTV
- (2016) Lighting The Himalayas NDTV
