= Amir Ali =

Amir Ali or variants may refer to:

- Syed Ameer Ali (1849–1928), Indian lawyer and scholar
- Amir Ali (Indian cricketer) (1939–1985), Indian cricketer
- Aamir Ali (born 1977), Indian television actor and model
- Aamer Ali (born 1978), Pakistani cricketer who plays for Oman
- Amir Ali (judge) (born 1985), American federal judge
- Aamir Ali (cricketer) (born 2002), Pakistani cricketer
- Amir Ali (field hockey) (born 2004), Indian field hockey player

== See also ==
- Ameer Ali (disambiguation)
- Amir Ali Khan, former nawab (ruler) of the Indian princely state of Malerkotla from 1821 to 1846
- Amer Ali Khan (born 1973), Indian journalist and politician
