= Ameer Ali =

Ameer Ali may refer to:

- Ameer Ali (academic), economic professor and former chairman of Muslim organizations in Australia
- Amir Khan (singer) (1912–1974), Indian singer, a Hindustani classical vocalist
- Syed Ameer Ali (1849–1928), Indian judge and translator of the Quran

== See also ==
- Amir Ali (disambiguation)
- Ameer Ali Shihabdeen (born 1961), Sri Lankan politician
