= Almer (surname) =

Almer is a surname. Notable people with the surname include:

- Christian Almer (1826–1898), Swiss mountain guide
- Edward Almer, 16th-century Welsh politician
- Franz Almer (born 1970), Austrian footballer and manager
- Robert Almer (born 1984), Austrian footballer
- Tandyn Almer (1942–2013), American musician
- William Almer (fl. 1572), Welsh politician

== See also ==
- Almar, list of people with a similar name
