= Aamir =

Aamir may refer to:

- Emir, Islamic leader
- Aamir (film), a 2008 Indian film
- Aamir (given name)

== See also ==
- Amir (disambiguation)
- Almir (given name)
