= Elmira Township =

Elmira Township may refer to the following places in the United States:

- Elmira Township, Stark County, Illinois
- Elmira Township, Michigan
- Elmira Township, Minnesota
