= Ali Amiri (historian) =

Ottoman Turkish historian and author (1857–1924)

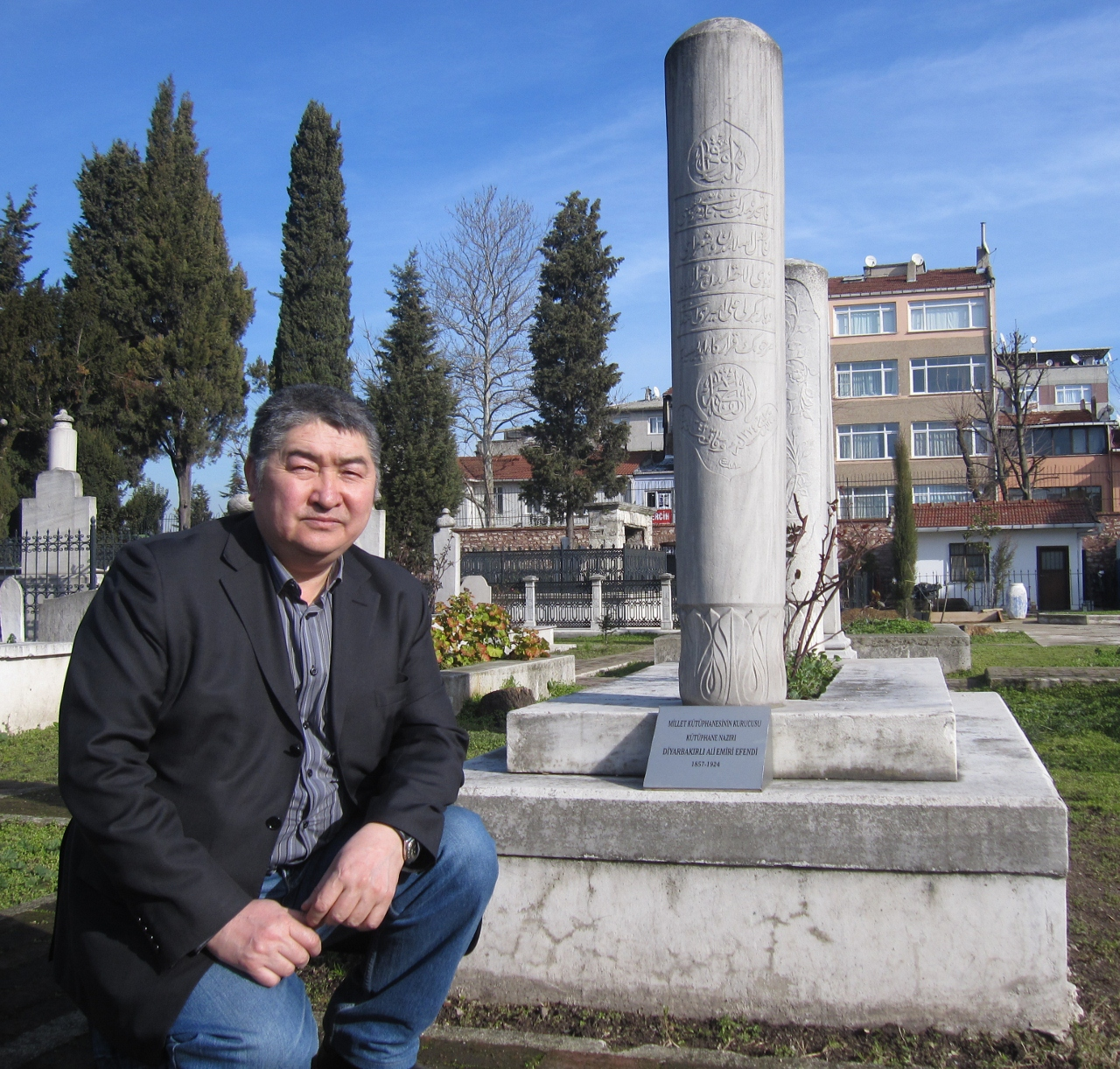
- Tyntchtykbek Tchoroev in front of Amiri's tomb
- Born: 1857; Diyarbakır, Ottoman Empire
- Died: 1923 (aged 65–66); Istanbul, Ottoman Empire
- Occupations: Historian, Finance Official
- Writing career
- Genres: Ottoman history, Literature
- Notable works: Ta'rih ve-Edebiyyat, Divan Luğat al-Turk (editor)

Ali Amiri (b. 1857 Diyarbakır - d. 1923 Istanbul) was an Ottoman historian. He worked as a finance official and used his assignments to different towns to transcribe Arabic and Turkish inscriptions that he found. He sought out local histories and old documents, both historical and poetic. Through his endeavours he built a library of rare and unpublished manuscripts. These manuscripts augmented the National Library of Istanbul.

Ali was a member of various historical societies and was the publisher of the Ta'rih ve-Edebiyyat as well as the editor of the Divan Luğat al-Turk of Mahmud Kashgari. Although he was known as an editor he did write historical and literary works. He was a key figure in the classification of the archives of the Sublime Porte in Istanbul, giving his name to one of the catalogues, Ali Emiri tasnifi.
