= Elmira, Idaho =

Unincorporated community in the state of Idaho, United States

Coordinates: 48°28′47″N 116°27′45″W

- Elmira, Idaho

Population
  - Total: 50

Elmira is an unincorporated community in Bonner County, in the U.S. state of Idaho.

Elmira lies along U.S. Highway 95, about 12 miles north of Sandpoint and 28 miles south of Bonners Ferry.

It sits in the scenic Panhandle region of Idaho, surrounded by forests and mountains near the Selkirk Range.

== History ==
A post office called Elmira was established in 1892, and remained in operation until 1954. The community served miners on a pack-horse route.

Elmira's population was 50 in 1909, and was estimated at 20 in 1960.
