= Hacıalılar, Shamkir =

Hacıalılar
- Municipality
- Location within Azerbaijan
- Coordinates: 40°46′44″N 45°52′31″E
- Country: Azerbaijan
- Rayon: Shamkir

Population
  - Total: 481
- Time zone: UTC+4 (AZT)
  - Summer (DST): UTC+5 (AZT)

Hacıalılar is a village and municipality in the Shamkir Rayon of Azerbaijan. It has a population of 481.
