= Lindsay Amer =

American LGBTQ activist

- Education: Northwestern University; Queen Mary University of London
- Occupations: LGBTQ activist; YouTuber

YouTube information
- Channel: Queer Kid Stuff
- Years active: 2015–present
- Genre: LGBTQ content
- Subscribers: 30.1 thousand
- Views: 4.96 million
- Last updated: 20 October 2025

Lindsay Amer is an American LGBTQ activist and YouTuber. Amer created and hosts Queer Kid Stuff, a YouTube channel directed at children and focused on LGBTQ issues. Amer has been recognized by GLAAD, the TED Conference, and the Webby Awards for their work relating to LGBTQ education and advocacy.

== Career ==
=== Queer Kid Stuff ===
Amer is the creator and host of Queer Kid Stuff, a child-directed YouTube channel focused on LGBTQ issues, as well as CEO of media production company Queer Kid Studios. Amer launched Queer Kid Stuff in April 2016, and states that they created Queer Kid Stuff due to a lack of LGBTQ education and LGBTQ representation in the media for the demographic of children ages 3 to 7.

==== Content ====
Queer Kid Stuff is aimed at young children of ages three and up. The show discusses sexuality, gender identity, and other LGBTQ issues that Amer calls "the ABCs of LGBT", as well as pop-culture topics. The show's presentation is adapted for a child audience; for instance, a video on consent uses the sharing of toys as an example in place of sexual activity.

Queer Kid Stuff is co-hosted by Teddy, a talking teddy bear who, according to Amer, provides the "voice of [a] child" and adds non-binary representation by virtue of it being a "genderless entity". "Relatable" child entertainment and education methods, such as "toys, blocks, and stop-motion animation", are used to explain LGBTQ concepts. Queer Kid Stuff videos are approximately four minutes long.

Queer Kid Stuff has covered LGBTQ topics such as homophobia, gay marriage, gender identity, drag, and the history of the Stonewall riots, as well as sexual education issues like consent.

==== Reception ====
Queer Kid Stuff videos have received differing reviews from commentators.

In June 2018, writer Priscilla Blossom, in an article on online magazine Romper, called Queer Kid Stuff "the LGBTQ-positive show we were missing as kids" and evaluated Amer's message of "just [being] happy with the way you are" as one "we can all get behind."

In November 2018, the showing of Queer Kid Stuff videos, among other presentations on transgender issues, at Nederland Elementary School in Boulder County, Colorado caused controversy. One parent wrote to a local news station that the set of presentations went "beyond a simple message of tolerance and acceptance," calling its topic "highly controversial and divisive" and adding that the presentation was "simply not age appropriate."

In an interview in July 2018, Amer responded to a question on the issue of age inappropriateness and indoctrination, stating that "any education for kids this young is technically indoctrination" and that the show's message of "diversity and inclusion" is "a message that every kid needs to see."

==== YouTube lawsuit ====
In August 2019, Amer joined a group of LGBTQ YouTubers in filing a lawsuit against YouTube and Google, alleging that YouTube and its parent company Google had engaged in unfair demonetization and hiding of videos that was discriminatory toward LGBTQ content. YouTube representative Alex Joseph responded that "all content" on YouTube was subject to the same content and advertising policies, and that YouTube does not "restrict or demonetize videos based on these factors or the inclusion of terms like 'gay' or 'transgender.'" The group of LGBTQ YouTubers was represented by the Browne George Ross law firm, which had also filed a lawsuit against YouTube alleging discrimination against conservative YouTubers.

=== Bluelaces Theatre Company ===
Amer is a founder of Bluelaces, a theater company that produces performances and hosts theater workshops and summer camps for people with autism or other developmental disabilities.

== Awards and recognitions ==
In 2017, Amer was a recipient of the GLAAD Rising Stars Grant, which awards LGBTQ youth and support initiatives that "champion intersectional LGBTQ issues."

In 2018, Queer Kid Stuff became a Webby Awards honoree in the Public Service & Activism (Channels & Networks) category.

In February 2019, Amer became a TED Resident.

== Personal life ==
Amer is Jewish and comes from New York City. Amer is non-binary and utilizes they/them pronouns.

Amer received a bachelor's degree in theater and gender studies from Northwestern University and a master's degree in theater and performance studies from Queen Mary University of London.

=== Harassment ===
In 2016, a video by Amer was posted to a Neo-Nazi publication accompanied with a headline that called them a "Sick Dyke" who was trying to "Brainwash Children into the Homosexual Lifestyle". Amer stated that this was followed by a series of anti-Semitic and homophobic remarks being posted in the comments section of their videos and tweeted at both Queer Kid Stuff's and their own Twitter accounts.
