= Admir Softić =

Bosnian footballer (born 1986)

Personal information
- Date of birth: 14 May 1986 (age 40)
- Place of birth: Sarajevo, SFR Yugoslavia
- Height: 1.94 m (6 ft 4 in)
- Position: Midfielder

Youth career
- –2002: FK Sarajevo

Senior career*
Years	Team	Apps	(Gls)
2002–2003	FK Sarajevo		
2003–2008	Cork City	16	(1)
2008–2009	Željezničar Sarajevo	1	(0)
2009–2010	Kolding	5	(1)
2010–2011	SAŠK Napredak		
2011–2013	SV Wilhelmshaven	77	(6)
2013–2015	TuS Koblenz	30	(0)
2014–2016	TuS Koblenz II	34	(4)
2017–2018	SC Vallendar		
2018–2020	TuS Koblenz	37	(6)
Total		200	(18)

Managerial career
- 2015–2016: Cosmos Koblenz
- 2018–2020: TuS Koblenz (player assistant)
- 2020–: TuS Koblenz (assistant)
- * Club domestic league appearances and goals

Admir Softić (born 14 May 1986) is a Bosnian retired professional footballer who played as a midfielder.

== Playing career ==
Softić was born in Sarajevo. started his career with Cork City in Ireland in 2003, having moved there from his native country Bosnia and Herzegovina.

Softić had a successful time with Cork City's youth teams and that caught the eye of the senior manager who signed him as a full-time pro at the age of 17.

He made a handful of appearances for the first team during his time at Cork, which included three Champions League qualifier games against Apollon Limassol and Red Star Belgrade respectively. He only made a sub appearance against Apollon in Cyprus, while he played full 90 minutes against Red Star in both legs of the qualifiers.

Softić also won the FAI Cup '07 with Cork and lost two Cup finals (FAI Cup '05 and Setanta Cup '06) during his time there. In 2008, after Alan Mathews arrived as the new manager of Cork City, things did not look well for Softić. He only made one appearance in the League Cup against Cobh Ramblers and put in a transfer request in mid-July.

Softić left the club after five years and joined one of the biggest clubs in his native country, FK Željezničar in Sarajevo, but in the first month after arriving, he had a horrific injury, breaking his ankle in two places and was sidelined for the next five months.

He came back after the injury and finally made his debut in March 2009 away to FK Sloboda. After the season, he parted ways with the club and moved to Denmark where he was playing for Kolding FC, until January 2010. On 28 February 2010, Softić lined-out for Cork City in a pre-season match against Crosshaven FC. He also holds Irish citizenship, so he can play as a communitarian in any EU country.

He then spent the next years in German lower league football, most prominently with fourth tier side TuS Koblenz. In January 2017 he joined German amateur side SC Vallendar.

== Managerial career ==
After hanging up his boots, Softić became an academy coach at his last club he served as a player, TuS Koblenz.
