= Amira Virgil =

American gamer and activist (born 1993)

Amira Virgil (born 1993), also known as XMiraMira, is an American gaming content creator and a community organizer for Black and female gamers. Virgil is particularly active in The Sims. She developed the Melanin Pack, to create more—and more natural—skin tone options for sims, has worked to integrate Black slang and pop culture more naturally into the world of The Sims, as well as developing multiple networks for Black gamers and developers. Virgil has worked extensively with Electronic Arts and is a Twitch Partner and Ambassador. She won the Sims celebrity competition show, Spark'd, and was a 2018 Gamers Choice Awards "Fan Favorite Female Gamer/Streamer" nominee. In 2020, Virgil was one of Vice's Humans of the Year.

== Early life ==
Born and raised in Brooklyn, New York, United States, Virgil started gaming when she was four years old. She began playing The Sims 2 when she was in middle school, enjoying the "digital dollhouse."

== Career ==
Virgil began creating The Sims content 2015. She streamed Let's Play videos on YouTube for about a year, and then also started streaming on Twitch. She ultimately became a Twitch Partner and Ambassador. Her critiques of racial inequities, as well of her sense of humor, drew an audience. Eventually, her audience became large enough that she quit her job at Walmart and became a full-time content-creator.

In 2016, Virgil released the Melanin Pack, a mod that allowed players to access fifty realistic skin tones that were not available within The Sims. As of 2020, the Melanin Pack had been downloaded over a million times.

Virgil also founded networks for Black users and creators: The Black Simmer and The Noir Network. The Black Simmer forum has almost 180,000 members, as of early 2024. The Noir Network, a collective created in 2021, brings exposure, networking, and education for Black femme/female creators and influencers. It connects them to paid opportunities as it strives to bridge the opportunity and pay gaps that Black, female influencers and creators face. It has worked with companies such as Xbox, The CW, Wizards of the Coast, NZXT. Virgil was also one of the founders of the "gaming lifestyle" company Queens Gaming Collective.

=== Electronic Arts ===
In 2017 an interview she gave about the lack of representation in The Sims went viral on Twitter. In 2020, Virgil was one of the leaders of a community of Simmers who ran a campaign on Twitter and Change.org to get Electronic Arts, maker of The Sims, to build in more realistic options for Sim creation, instead of consistiently depending on developers like herself to do it for them. She became a consultant for EA, helping them improve the options available within the product, including joining their Game Changers program. Her experiences with personal attacks on her various platforms was also a driver behind EA's Building Healthy Communities Summit in 2019.

EA invited Virgil to compete on a four-episode TBS competition with eleven other Simmers, called Spark'd. She was part of the winning group, Team Llama, along with two other celebrity Simmers: DrGluon and Simlicy. Virgil particularly contributed a range of body-positive, gender-non-conforming options throughout the competition. The prize was $100,000.
