= Amiri-ye Olya =

Amiri-ye Olya اميري عليا
- Village
- Location within Iran
- Coordinates: 31°24′35″N 51°00′23″E
- Country: Iran
- Province: Chaharmahal and Bakhtiari
- County: Lordegan
- Bakhsh: Central
- Rural District: Rig

Population (2006)
  - Total: 146
- Time zone: UTC+3:30 (IRST)
  - Summer (DST): UTC+4:30 (IRDT)

Amiri-ye Olya (Persian: اميري عليا, also Romanized as Amīrī-ye ‘Olyā and Amīrī ‘Olyā; also known as Amīrī-ye Bālā and Amīrī Bālā) is a village in Rig Rural District, in the Central District of Lordegan County, Chaharmahal and Bakhtiari Province, Iran. At the 2006 census, its population was 146, in 24 families.
