= Amira Griselda Gómez =

Mexican politician

- Born: 21 August 1954 (age 71); Monterrey, Nuevo León, Mexico
- Education: University of Monterrey
- Occupation: Deputy
- Political party: PRI

Amira Griselda Gómez Tueme (born 21 August 1954) is a Mexican politician affiliated with the PRI. She currently serves as Deputy of the LXII Legislature of the Mexican Congress representing Monterrey. She also served as Senator during the LX and LXI Legislatures.
