= Emir Işılay =

Turkish composer (born 1978)

Emir Işılay (born 23 August 1978, in Istanbul, Turkey) is a Turkish jazz and film composer and pianist/keyboardist. He is a graduate of Berklee College of Music and has worked as a music arranger/orchestrator/engineer on projects including TV series Boomtown (NBC) and Eyes (ABC), as well as the feature film Soul Plane (MGM). He also wrote additional music for the WB TV series Aaron Spelling production Summerland for the 1st and 2nd seasons (26 episodes) and Lifetime Television feature production "Murder on Pleasant Drive". He has played performed or worked with artists such as David Foster, Russell Ferrante, Heitor Pereira, Marco Mendoza, Michael Landau, Simon Phillips, and Jon Finn. He currently resides in Los Angeles, California.

== See also ==
- List of Turkish musicians
