= Admire, Pennsylvania =

Unincorporated community in Pennsylvania, US

Coordinates: 39°57′43″N 76°52′14″W

Admire is an unincorporated community in York County, Pennsylvania, United States.
