= Saheb al-Amiri =

Saheb al-Amiri (died 27 December 2006) was an Iraqi militant and insurgent, a high-ranking member of the Shia Islamist Mahdi Army and senior aide to Muqtada al-Sadr. He was killed in a U.S. raid in late 2006. Al-Amiri's death prompted al-Sadr to prolong his then boycott of the government by Sadrist members of parliament and ministers, which Prime Minister Nouri al-Maliki hoped he would end soon thereafter.

The US Army confirmed that Iraqi forces, co-operating with American advisors, took part in the action against al-Amiri, who "was involved in a bomb attack targeting a police chief in October."
