= Najiha Al-Amiri =

Iraqi politician

Najiha Al-Amiri (born 1956) is an Iraqi politician and a member of the Council of Representatives of Iraq.

== Early life ==
A Shiite Muslim, Najiha Al-Amiri was born in 1956 in Baghdad and attended the Al-Mustansiriya University.

== Career ==
At a young age, Al-Amiri joined the Shiite Islamic Dawa Party and, before she could finish college, was arrested by the Ba'athist regime of Iraqi dictator Saddam Hussein in 1979. She was kept in captivity and subjected to torture. She fled Iraq with her child in 1983 and continued her opposition of Hussein's regime, for which several of her family members were murdered.

Only after the 2003 invasion of Iraq succeeded did Al-Amiri return to Iraq. She helped establish a women's wing of the Dawa Party and founded the Islamic Women's Association. The following year, she completed her B.S. in Mathematics. She was elected to the Iraqi Transitional Assembly in 2005 and was a member of the constitutional drafting committee. In 2010, she joined the Council of Representatives of Iraq and serves on its Constitutional Review Committee and Committee on Martyrs and Political Prisoners.

== Personal life ==
Al-Amiri's husband was also a member of the Islamic Dawa Party and was killed in 1980.
