= Amira de la Rosa =

Colombian playwright, poet, journalist, and writer

- Born: Amira Hortensia Arrieta MacGregor; 7 January 1895; Barranquilla, Colombia
- Died: 1 September 1974 (aged 79); Barranquilla, Colombia
- Occupations: playwright, poet, journalist, and writer

Amira de la Rosa (born Amira Hortensia Arrieta MacGregor; 7 January 1895–1 September 1974) was a Colombian playwright, poet, journalist, and writer. She wrote the lyrics of the anthem of Barranquilla, Colombia.

== Life and career ==
=== Early life and education ===
De la Rosa was born Amira Hortensia Arrieta MacGregor in Barranquilla, Colombia, on 7 January 1895. She was the daughter of Rafael A. Arrieta and Enriqueta MacGregor (of Irish ancestry) and the oldest of nine siblings. She was also a granddaughter of poet and politician Diógenes Arrieta. Her interest in writing and teaching began while receiving her primary and secondary education at La Presentación de Barranquilla. At eighteen years old, she married the lawyer Reginaldo de la Rosa Ortega. They had a son named Ramiro. De la Rosa later traveled to Barcelona to study in an international course for training teachers managed by Maria Montessori. She then studied at the journalism school opened by the Spanish Catholic newspaper El Debate.

=== Career ===
After De la Rosa returned from a trip to Spain, she settled in Barranquilla. In 1926, she founded a school named after the Chilean poet Gabriela Mistral, whom she befriended while in Spain. Mistral later named a school in her hometown in Chile after De la Rosa on the 30th anniversary of her death.

De la Rosa wrote several plays including Madre Borrada (Erased Mother), Piltrafa, Las Viudas de Zacarías (The Widows of Zacarías). The subject of her most well known story, Marsolaire (1941), is the sexual abuse of a girl by her godfather. De la Rosa also contributed to the newspapers ABC (Madrid), El Tiempo (Bogotá), and El Heraldo (Barranquilla).

==== Barranquilla anthem ====
De la Rosa is most known for writing the lyrics to the Barranquilla anthem. The hymn was chosen as the winning entry during a competition in 1942, which she submitted under the pseudonym Pirausta. She is a recipient of the award Cruz de Boyacá, which was presented to her by Colombian president Guillermo Valencia. She was also awarded the first Public Improvements Society medal. On several occasions, she served as a consular representative of Colombia in Spain.

=== Death ===
De la Rosa died on 1 September 1974 in Barranquilla.

== Legacy ==
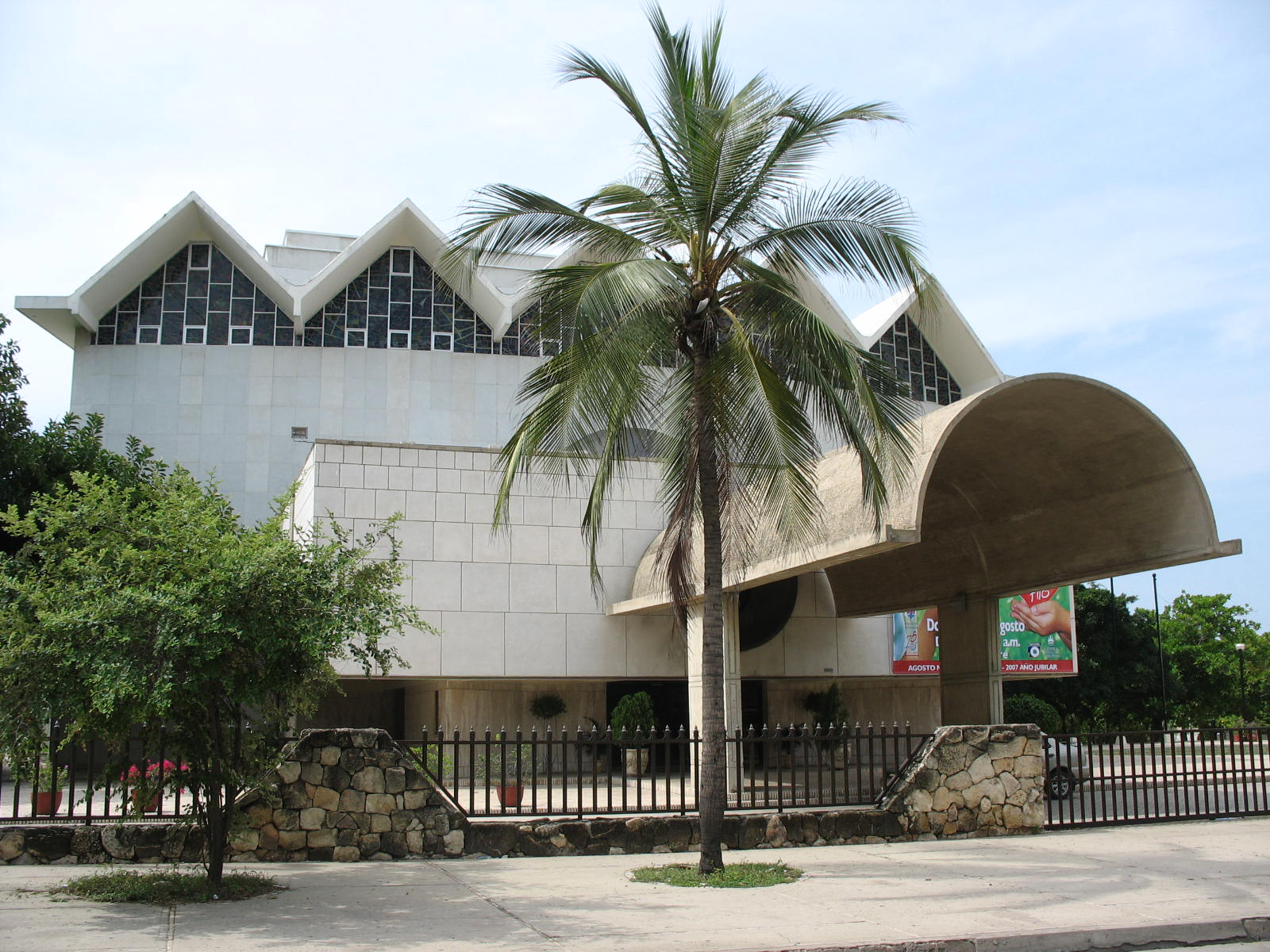
Teatro Amira de la Rosa, Barranquilla

In 1982, the Municipal Theater of Barranquilla was named in De la Rosa's honour. On the eve of her 126th birthday, in 2021, the Ministry of Culture, Heritage and Tourism of Barranquilla announced its plans to "exalt" De la Rosa's forgotten creative contributions to the city.
