= Amir, Sistan and Baluchestan =

Amir امير
- Village
- Location within Iran
- Coordinates: 31°07′16″N 61°47′02″E
- Country: Iran
- Province: Sistan and Baluchestan
- County: Hirmand
- Bakhsh: Central
- Rural District: Dust Mohammad

Population (2006)
  - Total: 21
- Time zone: UTC+3:30 (IRST)
  - Summer (DST): UTC+4:30 (IRDT)

Amir (Persian: امير, also Romanized as Amīr; also known as Deh-e Amīr) is a village in Dust Mohammad Rural District, in the Central District of Hirmand County, Sistan and Baluchestan Province, Iran. At the 2006 census, its population was 21, in 5 families.
