= Zainab Abdul Amir =

Bahraini politician and journalist

- زينب عبد الأمير

Member of the Council of Representatives (Bahrain)
- In office 2018–2022
- Monarch: Hamad bin Isa Al Khalifa
- Prime Minister: Khalifa bin Salman Al Khalifa
- Preceded by: Osama Al-Khaja
- Constituency: 7th District, Capital Governorate

Personal details
- Born: Zainab Abdul Amir Khalil Ibrahim
- Party: Independent
- Occupation: Journalist

Zainab Abdul Amir Khalil Ibrahim (Arabic: زينب عبد الأمير) is a Bahraini politician and journalist. On December 12, 2018, she was sworn in as a member of the Council of Representatives for the seventh district of the Capital Governorate.

== Education ==
She holds a Master of Arts from Ahlia University, earned with a thesis on assessing press freedom after the National Action Charter of Bahrain.

== Career ==
Abdul Amir worked as a Senior Media Specialist in the Public Relations Department of the Ministry of Works. She also worked as a journalist for the newspaper, Al Ayam.

== House of Representatives ==
She entered politics in the 2014 Bahraini general election, running for the seventh district seat in the Capital Governorate and receiving 1092 votes for 16.97% in the first round. She lost the second round to Osama Al-Khaja, getting 1373 votes for 39.60%.

She ran again in the same constituency in the 2018 Bahraini general election, followed by international media. Representatives of Agence France-Presse, Deutsche Presse-Agentur, and Alhurra attended the opening of her election headquarters. In the first round, on November 24, 2018, she won 2,945 votes, enough for 49.20%, just barely requiring a second round on December 1. She defeated Afaf al-Mousawi by winning 3,092 votes for 65.29% in the runoff, the first time in Bahrain that two women competed in a final contest.
