= Hacıalılar, Gadabay =

Village in Azerbaijan

Hacıalılar (also Hacallar) is a village in the municipality of Poladlı in the Gadabay Rayon of Azerbaijan.
