= Elmir =

Male given name

- Gender: Male

Other gender
- Feminine: Elmira

Origin
- Meaning: Prince, Ruler, Commander, Chief'

Other names
- Variant form: Almir

Elmir is a Bosnian masculine given name.

In the Balkans, Elmir is popular among Bosniaks in the former Yugoslav nations. The name is a modification to the name Emir, and it holds the same meanings of prince, ruler, commander, and chief.

== Given name ==
- Elmir Alimzhanov (born 1986), Kazakhstani fencer
- Elmir Asani (born 1995), Serbian footballer
- Elmir Jukić (born 1971), Bosnian film director
- Elmir Kuduzović (born 1985), Bosnian footballer
- Elmir Nabiullin (born 1995), Russian footballer

== See also ==
- Almir (given name)
- Elmar (given name)
- Elmer
- Elmira, a female given name
