= Mahmud al-Kashgari =

11th-century Turkic scholar and lexicographer

Maḥmūd al-Kashgari
- محمود الكاشغري
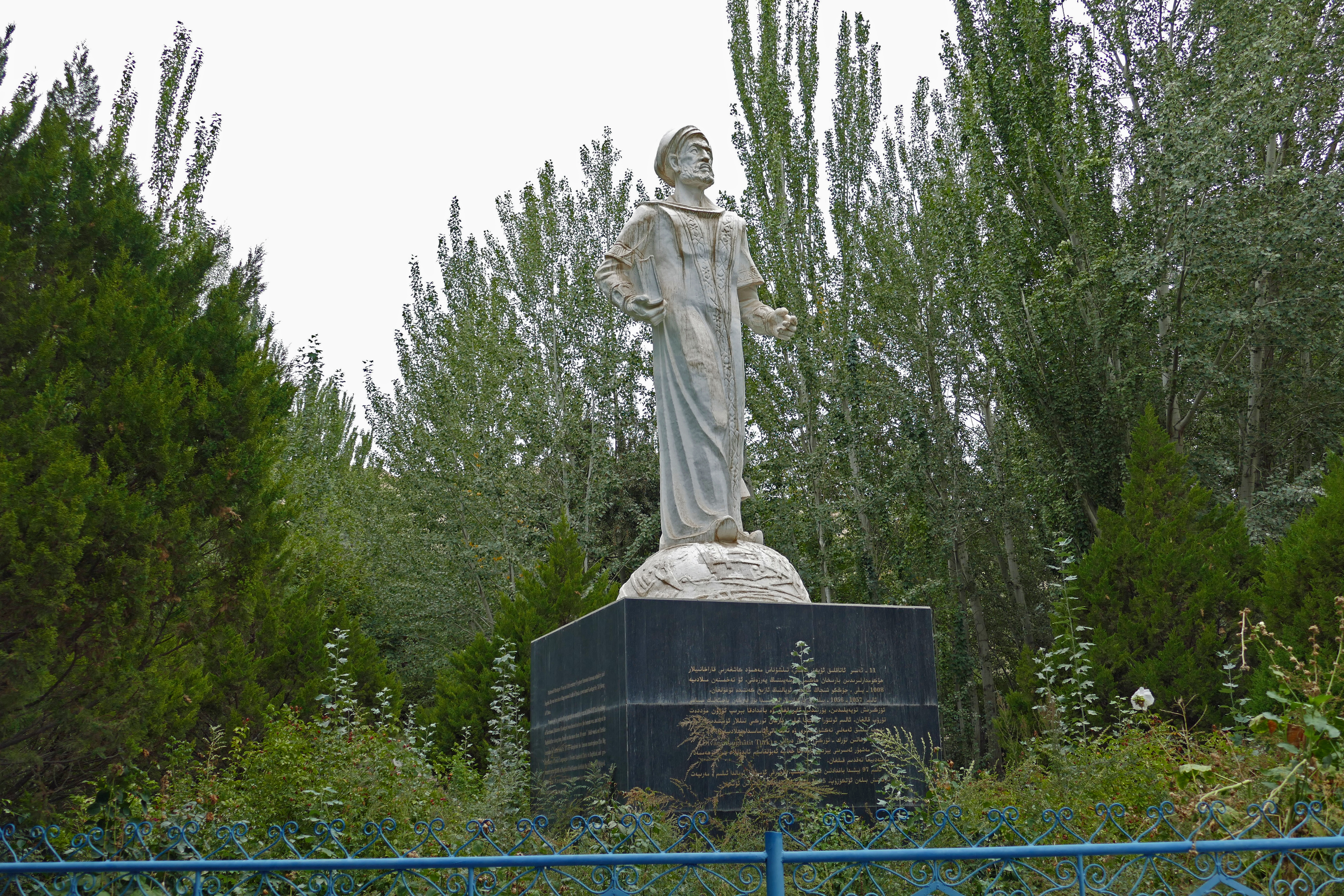
- Upal, Mausoleum of Mahmud al-Kashgari
- Born: 1005; Barsgan (now Kyrgyzstan), Kara-Khanid Khanate
- Died: 1102 (aged 97); Upal, Kara-Khanid Khanate
- Resting place: Upal, China
- Scientific career
- Fields: Linguistics, Lexicography, Turkology

Mahmud ibn Husayn ibn Muhammad al-Kashgari (Note: Arabic: محمود بن الحسين بن محمد الكاشغري, romanized: Maḥmūd ibnu 'l-Ḥusayn ibn Muḥammad al-Kāšġarī; Chinese: 麻赫穆德·喀什噶里; Turkish: Kaşgarlı Mahmûd; Uyghur: مەھمۇد قەشقىرى, romanized: Mehmud Qeshqiri, Мәһмуд Қәшқири; Uzbek: Mahmud Qashg'ariy, Махмуд Қашғарий) was an 11th-century Kara-Khanid scholar and lexicographer of the Turkic languages from Kashgar.

His father, Husayn, was the mayor of Barsgan, a town in the southeastern part of the lake of Issyk-Kul (nowadays village of Barskoon in Northern Kyrgyzstan's Issyk-Kul Region) and related to the ruling dynasty of Kara-Khanid Khanate. Around 1057 C.E., Mahmud al-Kashgari became a political refugee, before settling down in Baghdad.

== Work ==
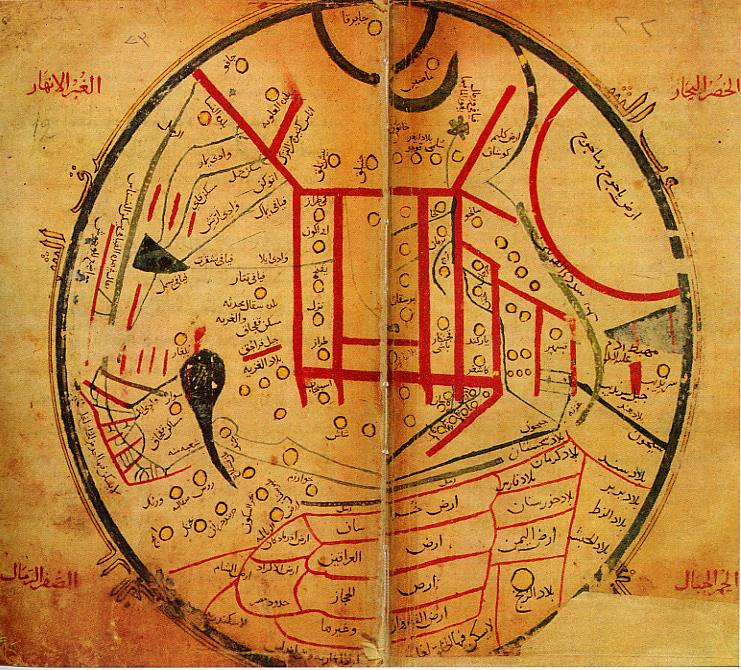
Map from Mahmud al-Kashgari's Diwan (11th century)

Al-Kashgari studied the Turkic languages of his time and in Baghdad, he compiled the first comprehensive dictionary of Turkic languages, the Dīwān Lughāt al-Turk (English: "Compendium of the languages of the Turks") in 1072–74. It was intended for use by the Abbasid Caliphate, the new Arab allies of the Turks. Mahmud Kashgari's comprehensive dictionary, later edited by the Turkish historian, Ali Amiri, contains specimens of old Turkic poetry in the typical form of quatrains (Persio-Arabic رباعیات, rubā'iyāt; Turkish: dörtlük), representing all the principal genres: epic, pastoral, didactic, lyric and elegiac. His book also included the first known map of the areas inhabited by Turkic peoples. This map is housed at the National Library in Istanbul.

Dīwān Lughāt al-Turk also contains linguistic data about multiple Turkic dialects that may have been gathered from merchants and others involved in trade along routes that travelled through Transoxiana. The origin of the compiled information is not known. Scholars believe it is likely that Kashgari would have gathered most of the content about Oguz-Turkmen from Oguz tribes in Khorasan since he himself was a student in Seljuk Baghdad, but it is possible that some of this material could have come from early Turkmen. Other scholars believe that the compendium was based on the Turkiyya language of the Chigil tribe in the Kara-Khanid confederation. However, scholars have not yet come to a settled conclusion.

Al-Kashgari advocated monolingualism and the linguistic purism of the Turkic languages and held a belief in the superiority of nomadic people (the Turkic tribes had traditionally been nomads) over urban populations. Most of his Turkic-speaking contemporaries were bilingual in New Persian, which was then the urban and literary language of Central Asia.

The most elegant of the dialects belongs to those who know only one language, who do not mix with Persians and who do not customarily settle in other lands. Those who have two languages and who mix with the populace of the cities have a certain slurring in their utterances.

Even so, Kashgari praised the dialect spoken by the bilingual Uyghurs as "pure" and "most correct" on par with those of Turkic monolinguals.

Al-Kashgari cautioned against the assimilation of the nomadic way of life into a sedentary culture. He recorded a Turkic proverb that warned, “Just as the effectiveness of a warrior is diminished when his sword begins to rust, so too does the flesh of a Turk begin to rot when he assumes the lifestyle of an Iranian.”

== Death ==
Some researchers think that Mahmud al-Kashgari died in 1102 at the age of 97 in Upal, a small city southwest of Kashgar and was buried there. There is now a mausoleum erected on his gravesite. But some modern authors reject this assertion, saying that the date of his death is just unknown.

== Legacy ==
He is claimed by Uyghur, Kyrgyz and Uzbek nationalists as part of their respective ethnic groups.

An oriental study university, situated in the capital city of Bishkek in post-Soviet Kyrgyzstan, was named after Makhmud Kashghari, in the 1990s.

UNESCO declared 2008 the Year of Mahmud al-Kashgari.

== See also ==
- Yusuf Khass Hajib
