= Pakistan Engineering Company =

Pakistani engineering company

- Type: Public
- Traded as: PSX: PECO
- Industry: Engineering
- Founded: 1932
- Founder: CM Latif
- Headquarters: Lahore, Pakistan
- Revenue: ▲ Rs. 1.424 billion (US$5.1 million) (2018)
- Operating income: ▼ Rs. −81.414 million (US$−290,000) (2018)
- Net income: ▼ Rs. −69.956 million (US$−250,000) (2018)
- Total assets: ▼ Rs. 15.968 billion (US$57 million) (2018)
- Total equity: ▼ Rs. 13.667 billion (US$49 million) (2018)
- Owner: State Engineering Company (24.88%); Rotocast Engineering Company (24.50%)
- Number of employees: 395 (2018)
- Website: peco.com.pk
- Footnotes; Financials as of 30 June 2018

Pakistan Engineering Company (PECO), formerly known as Batala Engineering Company (BECO) is a Pakistani engineering company based in Lahore. It was established by Chaudhry Mohammad Latif Arain in Batala, East Punjab, British India in 1932 and moved to Lahore, Pakistan after partition. The company was named as Batala Engineering Company Ltd after the name of Latif’s hometown.

== History ==
=== 1932 to 1936 ===
Muslims at the time had no share in any business in India. They started thinking along the lines of uniting and starting something to help their less fortunate brothers. A meeting was held in Islamia School, Batala in which 100 Muslims showed up and it was decided a wholesale business would be started under the company. Latif bought the first 300 shares while the rest were sold to outsiders. In March 1933, the company was registered with Rs. 6024 and in July it received the Commencement Certificate. By the end of 1934, the company had already started manufacturing chaff-cutters.

=== 1937 to 1939 ===
Mr. Latif Arain decided to establish a foundry and machine shop to start manufacturing agricultural implements in a proper way. For this purpose land was taken at the back of the rolling mill and both the shops were established. In early 1939, Mr. Latif entered a partnership with Dulat Ram to overcome the matter of shortage of capital. They went to Calcutta to buy scrap and then to Bombay to buy more material. In September of that year, 2nd World War broke out and prices of raw material shot up. This made the business very profitable. The Company purchased two additional Japanese lathes driven by a pulley and installed them in the agriculture shop, where chaff-cutters were made. The Company also did not possess any milling or planing machines, so a 6-feet long planing machine was purchased along with a milling machine.

=== 1940 to 1944 ===
The government of India made a scheme to help industries by giving leases. Because of this, the company extended its works and planned to build a new machine and foundry shop to cater for the casting of the machine tools. A branch office was opened at Lahore, the purpose of which was to represent the company in Lahore and also to introduce the chaff-cutter machines in the area. At the factory, an assembly shop was constructed and a multistory office was raised in front of the old office.

=== 1945 to 1947 ===
BECO was selected to have one-half of the Wagner. Arrangements were made to ship it to Batala but meanwhile independence was announced. Hence the plant was shipped to Badami Bagh, Lahore, where it got installed later at the factory allotted in lieu of BECO's property in Batala. Establishment of Pakistan resulted in migration of the share-holders and directors along with the Company’s records. However, all of its assets were left behind.

== Post Partition ==
After partition, the second phase of BECO development began. It was a beginning from scratch all over again. In December 1947, BECO was allotted Mukand Iron & Steel Works Ltd., an abandoned factory that required reconditioning on a large scale. About 120 machines of the Wagner Plant, obtained from Germany, were installed in the premises of the allotted factory. Huge constructions had to be undertaken to accommodate these machines. It took 3 years for the old Mukand Factory to grow into modern BECO Works. Beco now consisted of eight departments; Steel works, steel foundry, steel rolling mills, iron and nonferrous foundry, machine tool shop, diesel engine shop, structural shop, and general engineering shop.

In 1955, BECO was listed on the Karachi Stock Exchange.

== Nationalization ==
Zulfikar Ali Bhutto took over on December 21, 1971 and on January 1, 1972 his government promulgated the Nationalization and Economic Reforms Order nationalizing 31 key industrial units, completely wiping out BECO. The company's name was changed to PECO (Pakistan Engineering Company). Like other nationalized companies, PECO struggled to succeed, and by 1998, it had accumulated an acknowledged loss of Rs. 761.58 billion. In October 1977, General Zia-ul-Haq offered to return control of the company to Mr. Latif and his management, but Mr. Latif refused the offer unless it was extended to the owners of all nationalized industries. After the amendments to the Economic Reforms Order, Latif had a brief meeting with the President, during which he raised the issue of BECO's return to its original management. The President acknowledged the concern and promised to expedite the matter for an early resolution; however, before he could fulfill his promise, he was assassinated. Subsequently, the incoming government amended the Transfer of Management Order 12 of 1978, adopting a new procedure to sell these units through open bidding to the highest bidder.

== Privatization ==
In 1995, the privatization commission advised the company to close down Badami Bagh Works. When this didn’t work, the Government abandoned the factory and sold out tons and tons of steel in the building infrastructure. In 1999, the Privatization Commission got active again and placed an advertisement of PECO on sale one more time. Latif went to the courts and filed a case in the Lahore High Court against the Privatization method which was declined. In June, 2003 it came to be known that the Government was negotiating privately to sell PECO's assets and again going back on its mandate to privatize the Company as a whole identity.

The government restructured the company with having all the machines, equipment, steel sheds moved from Badami Bagh to Kot Lakhpat. Decision to close down unprofitable segments of the company was taken which included shutting low technology products such as machine tools or power looms. The corporate structure of the company was altered with private shareholding increased to 67% and government shareholding reduced. As a result of this decision, recovery of loans worth Rs3.314 billion which PECO owed to the government became doubtful.

In an investigative report compiled by Javed Hasnain Rashid & Company, a chartered accounting firm retained by PECO management in 2018, it is alleged that the ultimate buyers of the shares from NIT were veteran investment banker Arif Habib, through Rotocast Engineering (Pvt) Ltd, and Masood Ahmad Khan Soodi, through Maha Securities. The central allegation in the report was that NIT acted on behalf of Arif Habib and his associates and improperly sold its shares, an action that, if true, would constitute not just insider trading, but several other counts of securities fraud. The government only retained a one-third share in the company until private shareholders, led by Arif Habib, flipped the board of directors. The government now only had three seats while private shareholders controlled six.

== The Private Control Era ==
In the six years ending June 30, 2004, even as PECO accumulated net losses, its revenue grew in extraordinary numbers, so much so that it nearly quadrupled. Despite this unauthorized sale of NIT shares being reported almost immediately, no real action was taken during the Musharraf Administration. However, when President Asif Ali Zardari was sworn in, there was a renewed interest in the legislature to examine the record of the military government. The Public Accounts Committee (PAC) of the National Assembly, led by Sardar Ayaz Sadiq, formed a committee to find out what happened and who was responsible. The committee ended up blaming officials, claiming that insider trading had taken place. The report’s specific language was highly debatable. It claimed that there was insider trading and that private shareholders were able to gain control of PECO as a result of that insider trading. It urged the government to buy back shares rather than demanding they simply be confiscated. The government then tried to enter into negotiations with Arif Habib in the hopes of getting him to sell his shares but he decided against it.

== PECO Now ==
The management of the Pakistan Engineering Company (PECO) is said to have virtually halted the working of the company since 2019 as the Board of Directors has been disbanded due to which no board meeting has been held for the past few years. Due to a dispute between the MD and the Board of Directors, it was decided that the reconstitution of the board and removal of the MD was the first step in proceeding further. The Privatization Division briefed the cabinet body about the case and submitted the following proposals for consideration and approval of the CCOP as recommended by the Privatization Commission board in its meeting held on June 3, 2021 and proposed that PECO be removed from the active privatization list. The company is at present non-functional.
