= Amira =

Amira, Ameerah, or Ameera may refer to:

== Arts and entertainment ==
- Amira (album), by Amira Willighagen, 2014
- Amira (film), a 2021 Jordanian film

== People ==
- Amira (name), an Arabic and Hebrew female given name
- Amira (British singer)
- Amira (Egyptian singer) (born 1974)
- Ameerah (singer) (born 1983), Belgian-Tunisian singer
- Ameera al-Taweel (born 1983), former Saudi princess
- Princess Ameerah of Brunei (born 2008), Bruneian princess

== Other ==
- Amira (software), a data analysis and visualization software
- USS Ameera, a U.S. Navy patrol vessel in commission 1917–1919
- Amira language or Jebel el Amira, a Niger–Congo language spoken in Kordofan, Sudan
- Amira Nature Foods, an Indian food company
- Amira (wasp), a wasp genus in the subfamily Encyrtinae
- Amira (Ottoman Empire), an elite Ottoman Armenian business class

== See also ==
- Amir (disambiguation)
- Procapperia amira, a moth of the family Pterophoridae
