= Ali Asan-e Amiri =

Ali Asan-e Amiri الياسان اميري
- Village
- Location within Iran
- Coordinates: 34°53′04″N 47°21′12″E
- Country: Iran
- Province: Kermanshah
- County: Sonqor
- Bakhsh: Kolyai
- Rural District: Agahan

Population (2006)
  - Total: 103
- Time zone: UTC+3:30 (IRST)
  - Summer (DST): UTC+4:30 (IRDT)

Ali Asan-e Amiri (Persian: الياسان اميري, also Romanized as ‘Ali Āsān-e Amīrī; also known as ‘Ali Āsān, ‘Alī Eḩsān, ‘Alī Eḩsān-e Ojāq, Amīrī, Elyāsān-e Amīrī, Elyasané Amjadi, and Elyāsān-e Soflá) is a village in Agahan Rural District, Kolyai District, Sonqor County, Kermanshah Province, Iran. At the 2006 census, its population was 103, in 22 families.
