= Amiri (surname) =

Amiri (Persian: امیری: Amīrī, Persian pronunciation: [æmiːˈɾiː], Hebrew: אמירי, Arabic: أميري) is a surname of Persian, Luri, Kurdish, Hebrew and Arabic origins. It is primarily an Iranian surname that means "of Amir" or "of house of Amir" in the Persian language.

== Meaning ==
In Persian, Amir has a different meaning with other languages, it consists of two parts; "A" which means "Un" and "mir" which is the root of the verb "Mordan" (to die), so Amir in Persian means "the one who [his spirit and his memory] will never die". The surname Amiri receiving the Persian suffix -i (ی) meaning "of", was derived from the same root (Amir) to be selected by the people (mostly Iranian and of Persian descent) as a surname for their family. So the surname literally means "of Amir" or "of house of Amir".

Notable people with the name or surname include:

- Ali Amiri (historian) (1857–1923), Ottoman historian
- Ali Amiri (Afghan footballer) (born 1985), German-Afghan footballer
- Ali Amiri (Iranian footballer) (born 1988), Iranian footballer for Rah Ahan
- Mike Amiri, Iranian-American fashion designer and founder of the brand Amiri
- Nadiem Amiri, German footballer of Afghan descent
- Ramona Amiri (born 1980), Iranian-Canadian Miss World Canada 2005
- Rich Amiri, American rapper
- Shahram Amiri (1977–2016), Iranian nuclear scientist
- Shamsuddin Amiri (born 1985), Afghan football player
- Vahid Amiri, Iranian international footballer
- Zubayr Amiri, Afghan footballer
