= Amir Amini (academic) =

Professor and Endowed

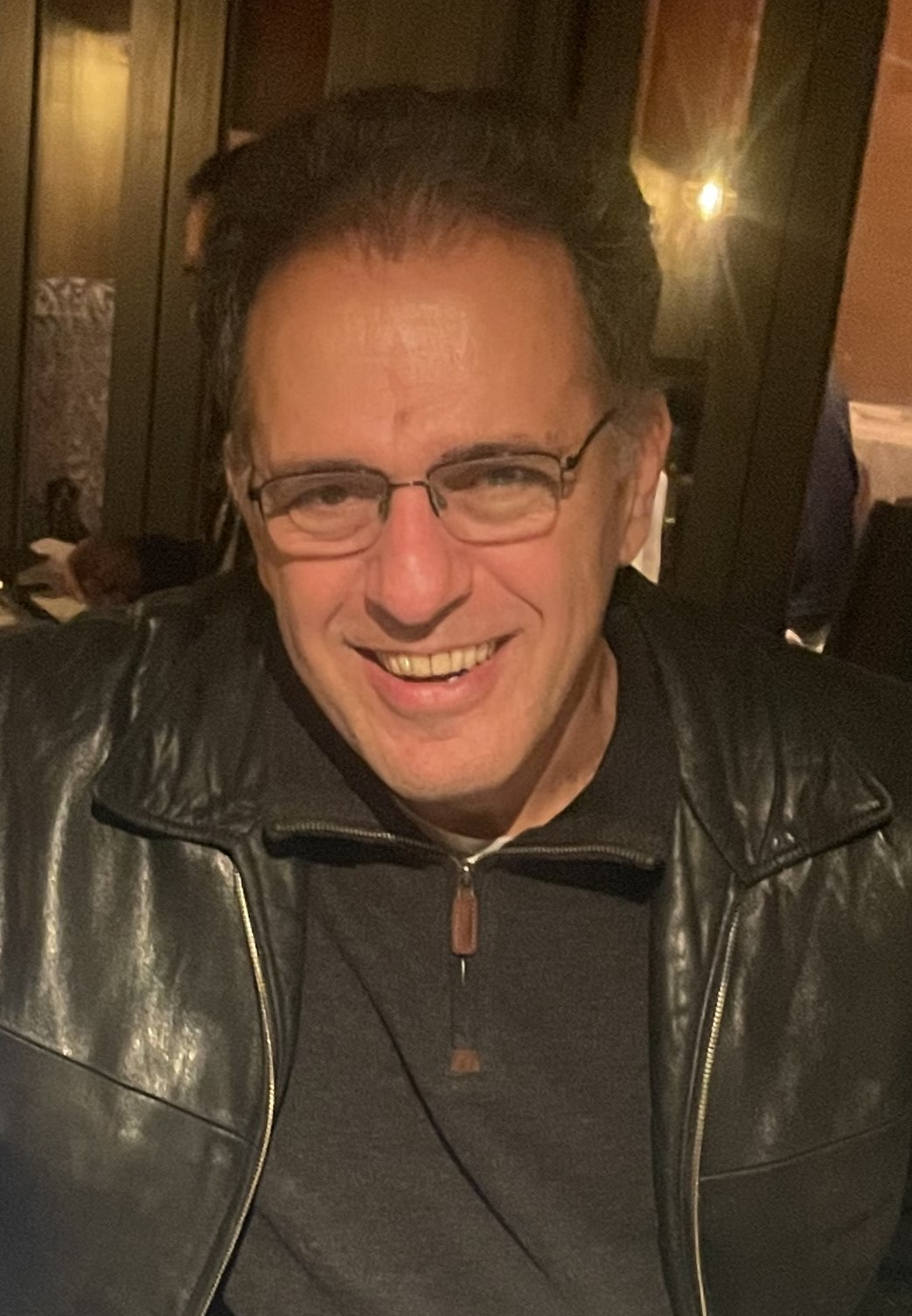
- Education: University of Massachusetts, Amherst; The University of Michigan, Ann Arbor
- Occupations: Engineer; Professor
- Scientific career
- Fields: Medical Imaging, Artificial Intelligence
- Workplaces: Yale University; Washington University in St. Louis; University of Louisville

Amir Amini is the professor and endowed chair in bioimaging at the University of Louisville. Prior to this, he was the founder of the Cardiovascular Image Analysis Laboratory and associate professor at the Washington University in St. Louis. He was elected a fellow of the IEEE (Engineering in Medicine and Biology Society) in 2007, the College of Fellows of the American Institute of Medical and Biological Engineering in 2017, the International Society for Optics, Photonics, and Imaging in 2019, the Asia-Pacific Artificial Intelligence Association in 2021, and the International Academy of Medical and Biological Engineering in 2024.

== Early life and education ==
Amir Amini attended Center Grove High School in Greenwood, Indiana. He graduated with the B.S. in Electrical Engineering with high honors from the University of Massachusetts at Amherst in 1983, where he was the youngest member of his graduating class at the age of 18. In 1984 he received an MSE degree from University of Michigan, Ann Arbor, where he also earned his PhD from the Artificial Intelligence Lab in 1990.

== Career ==
=== Teaching ===
Following two years of postdoctoral work at Yale University, Amini served as an assistant professor from 1992 to 1996. He was then on the faculty at Washington University in St. Louis from 1996 to 2006, where he became an associate professor with tenure and founded the Cardiovascular Image Analysis Laboratory. He is now the professor and endowed chair in bioimaging at the University of Louisville, where he has taught since 2006 and directs the Medical Imaging Laboratory. In 2009 and 2011 he was the recipient of the University of Louisville Faculty Favorite Award for teaching excellence He serves on the executive committee of the Center for AI in Radiological Sciences at the University of Louisville.

=== Professional activities ===
Amini was the chair of SPIE Medical Imaging Conference on Physiology, Function, and Structure from Medical Images from 2002 to 2006, and in 2007 he co-chaired the SPIE Medical Imaging Symposium. That year he was also elected a fellow of the IEEE (Engineering in Medicine and Biology Society) with the citation “for contributions to cardiovascular imaging and medical image analysis”.

He joined the editorial board of the journal IEEE Transactions on Medical Imaging in 1999 and the editorial board of the journal Computerized Medical Imaging and Graphics in 2012. After receiving the Distinguished Lecturer Award from the IEEE EMBS in 2013, he served on the IEEE EMBS Technical Committee on Biomedical Imaging and Image Processing. Between 2016 and 2018, he served on the IEEE EMBS Administrative Committee. He Chaired the IEEE International Symposium on Biomedical Imaging in Washington, D.C. in 2018.

In 2017 he was elected a fellow of the College of Fellows of the American Institute of Medical and Biological Engineering “for outstanding contributions to cardiovascular imaging, medical image analysis, and magnetic resonance imaging of flow and motion”. He was next elected a fellow of the International Society for Optics, Photonics, and Imaging in 2019. Additionally, he is a fellow of the Asia-Pacific Artificial Intelligence Association. From 2020 to 2021, he served as the Vice President for Publications for the IEEE Engineering in Medicine and Biology Society for the term 2020-2021. Amini has been on the editorial board of IEEE Transactions on Biomedical Engineering (2014-2024), IEEE Journal of Biomedical Health Informatics between (2016-2019), the IEEE Open Journal of Engineering in Medicine and Biology since 2019, and the IEEE Reviews in Biomedical Engineering since 2020. He became Editor-in-Chief of IEEE Transactions in Biomedical Engineering in 2025.

== Research ==
Amini has made contributions in development and application of AI methods to medical imaging as well as development and application of MRI methods for determining flow and motion, including research supported by National Institute of Health and National Science Foundation grants. An area of significant focus for Amini’s laboratory is vascular and valvular flow imaging with MRI. Under NIH funding, his laboratory has developed scan efficient 4D Flow MRI Methods with non-Cartesian trajectories and deep Convolutional Neural Network models for efficient reconstruction of 4D flow MR images. His laboratory has also developed computational, AI methods for Velocity to Pressure mapping for estimation of intravascular and transvalvular pressure gradients.

Amini has worked on the development of computational methods for analysis of biomedical images, as well as the development of AI and Deep Learning methods for segmentation, disease classification, and analysis of medical images. Another area of research has been imaging motion with tagged MRI for determination of left-ventricular function and myocardial strain. Other research activities have included development of methods for image segmentation, determination of motion and tissue strain from US echocardiography, and lung 4D X-ray CT. In 2020, he received the University of Massachusetts at Amherst College of Engineering Distinguished Alumni Award.
