= Amir Slama =

Brazilian fashion designer

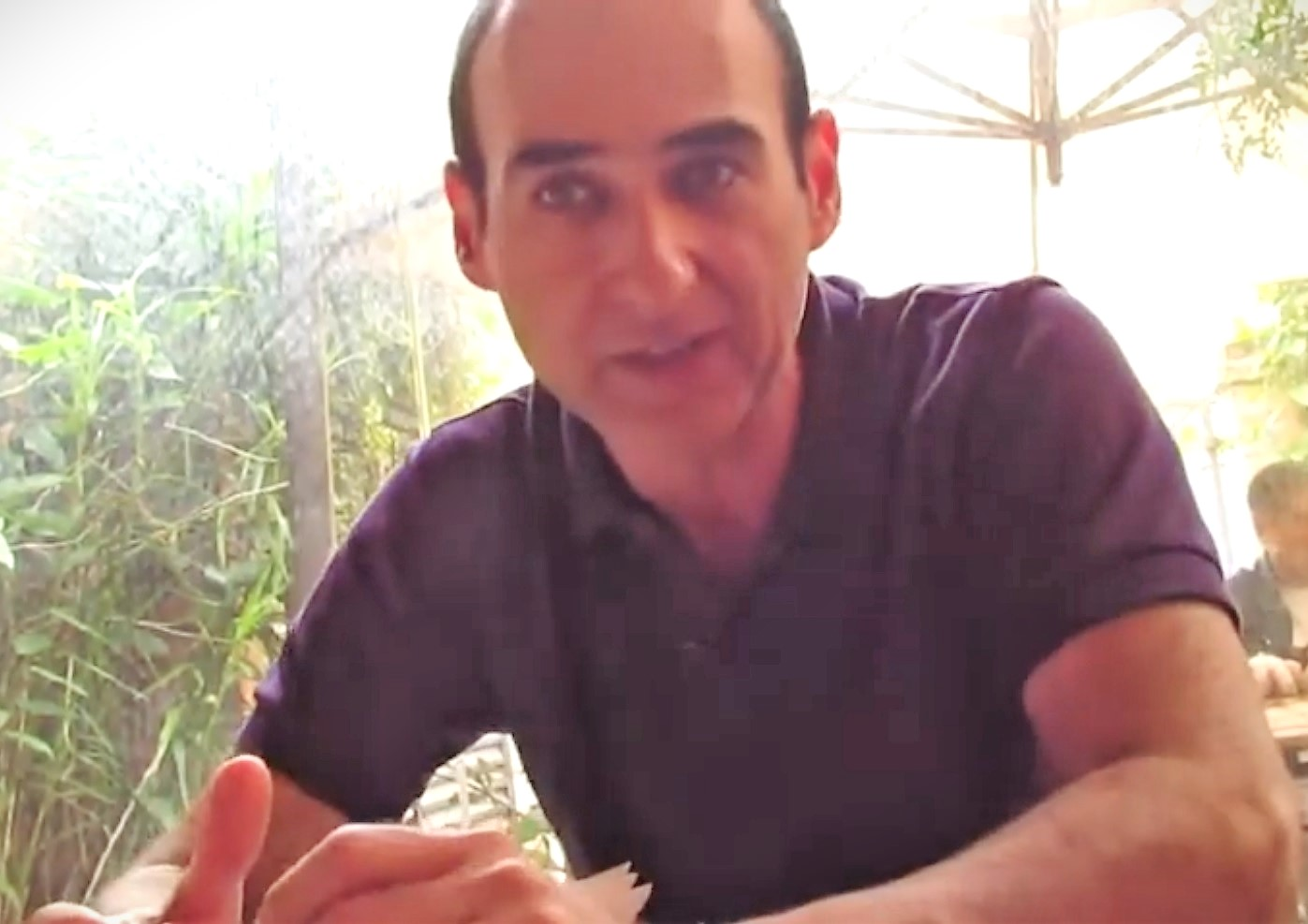
- Slama interviewed in 2020
- Born: 1965 (age 60–61); Brazil
- Labels: Rosa Chá; Amir Slama
- Awards: Brazil's Best Designer of the Year award in 2002 and 2003

Amir Slama (born 1965) is a Brazilian fashion designer. He was the designer, stylist and owner of the Brazilian beach fashion brand Rosa Chá. He now runs a brand under his name, Amir Slama, with stores in São Paulo and Rio de Janeiro.

== Early life ==
Amir's father came to Brazil when he was a little over 20 years old to work in the textile business as a trade representative on the 25 de Março street (in the Bom Retiro neighborhood); he later set up his own factory. Before coming to Brazil, his father lived for a few years in Israel, where he met his wife. Amir recalls that his parents spoke in Hebrew between themselves.

Amir was a history professor before establishing his career in the fashion industry; with the help of his wife, he started Rosa Cha. His talent has become known throughout the fashion community with Rosa Cha constantly being editorialized by Vogue, Harper's Bazaar, Elle, W Magazine, Sports Illustrated, Cosmopolitan, and many more.

He became friends with supermodel Naomi Campbell after she visited his shop in São Paulo; Campbell has modeled his collections on the runway ever since.

== Awards ==
- Brazil's Best Designer of the Year award in 2002 and 2003
