= Amiri-ye Sofla =

Village in Chaharmahal and Bakhtiari, Iran

Amiri-ye Sofla اميري سفلي
- Village
- Location within Iran
- Coordinates: 31°25′00″N 51°00′33″E
- Country: Iran
- Province: Chaharmahal and Bakhtiari
- County: Lordegan
- Bakhsh: Central
- Rural District: Rig

Population (2006)
  - Total: 480
- Time zone: UTC+3:30 (IRST)
  - Summer (DST): UTC+4:30 (IRDT)

Amiri-ye Sofla (Persian: اميري سفلي, also Romanized as Amīrī-ye Soflá; also known as Amīrī-ye Pā‘īn) is a village in Rig Rural District, in the Central District of Lordegan County, Chaharmahal and Bakhtiari Province, Iran. At the 2006 census, its population was 480, in 88 families.
