= USS Ameera =

Patrol vessel of the United States Navy

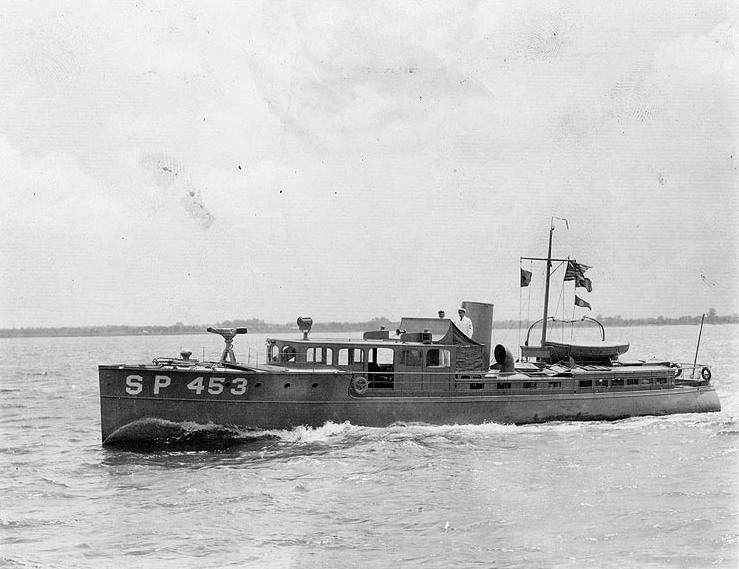
- USS Ameera (SP-453) during World War I.

History

United States
- Name: USS Ameera
- Namesake: Previous name retained
- Builder: Mathis Yacht Building Company, Camden, New Jersey
- Completed: 1917
- Acquired: 23 July 1917
- Commissioned: 11 August 1917
- Decommissioned: September 1919
- Fate: Destroyed by fire 28 May 1920

General characteristics
- Type: Section patrol vessel
- Tonnage: 28 GRT
- Displacement: 13.4 tons
- Length: 71 ft 3 in (21.72 m)
- Beam: 10 ft 8 in (3.25 m)
- Draft: 3 ft 6 in (1.07 m)
- Speed: 25 knots (29 mph; 46 km/h)
- Complement: 8
- Armament: 1 × 1-pounder gun; 1 × machine gun

USS Ameera (SP-453) was a United States Navy Section patrol vessel in commission from 1917 to 1919.

Ameera was built as an express cruiser in 1917 by the Mathis Yacht Building Company at Camden, New Jersey from Bowes and Mower designs for Alexander Sellers of Ardmore, Pennsylvania. The cruiser was Mathis hull number 63 and, upon registration, was assigned official number 214866 and signal letters LGTM.

Contemporary Navy data shows the vessel had a 1,000 gallon fuel capacity for a cruising range of 400 nautical miles at a cruising speed of 25 knots (29 mph; 46 km/h) powered by two Dusenberg six cylinder engines driving two propellers.

On 23 July 1917, the U.S. Navy purchased Ameera for $31,000 for use as a section patrol vessel during World War I. She was commissioned as USS Ameera (SP-453) on 11 August 1917 (Note: Ships' Data U.S. Naval Vessels has 13 August.)

Assigned to the 4th Naval District, Ameera carried out patrol duties there for the remainder of World War I. After the war ended on 11 November 1918, she performed dispatch boat and port duties at Philadelphia, Pennsylvania, until she was placed in reduced commission at the Philadelphia Navy Yard in June 1919. On 24 July 1919, Ameera was ordered to be sold. She was decommissioned in September 1919 and sold at auction on 27 April 1920 to Mr. T. E. Mitten.

On the night of 28 May 1920 a major fire at the Essington Shipbuilding Company lying just south of Philadelphia destroyed buildings and numerous boats, including almost total destruction of Ameera.
