= Bahramabad =

Bahramabad or Bahram Abad (Persian: بهرام اباد), also rendered as Baramabad, may refer to:

== Ardabil Province ==
- Bahramabad, Parsabad, a village in Parsabad County

== Chaharmahal and Bakhtiari Province ==
- Bahramabad, Chaharmahal and Bakhtiari, a village in Shahrekord County

== East Azerbaijan Province ==
- Bahramabad, East Azerbaijan, a village in Osku County

== Fars Province ==
- Bahramabad, Kazerun, a village in Kazerun County
- Bahramabad, Mohr, a village in Mohr County
- Bahramabad, Pasargad, a village in Pasargad County

== Golestan Province ==
- Bahramabad, Golestan, a village in Gonbad-e Qabus County, Golestan Province, Iran

== Hamadan Province ==
- Bahramabad, Hamadan, a village in Hamadan County

== Isfahan Province ==
- Bahramabad, Isfahan, a village in Fereydunshahr County

== Kerman Province ==
- Bahramabad, former name of Rafsanjan, a city in Kerman Province, Iran
- Bahramabad, Anbarabad, a village in Anbarabad County
- Bahramabad, Rigan, a village in Rigan County
- Bahramabad, Eslamiyeh, a village in Rafsanjan County

== Kermanshah Province ==
- Bahramabad, Kermanshah, a village in Kermanshah County

== Khuzestan Province ==
- Bahramabad, Andika, a village in Andika County
- Bahramabad, Abezhdan, a village in Andika County
- Bahramabad, Masjed Soleyman, a village in Masjed Soleyman County
- Bahramabad, Shushtar, a village in Shushtar County

== Kurdistan Province ==
- Bahramabad, Kurdistan, a village in Kurdistan Province, Iran
- Bahram Abad, Bijar, a village in Bijar County

== Lorestan Province ==
- Bahramabad, Lorestan, a village in Lorestan Province, Iran
- Bahramabad-e Olya, a village in Lorestan Province, Iran
- Bahramabad-e Sofla, a village in Lorestan Province, Iran

== Markazi Province ==
- Bahramabad, Markazi, a village in Markazi Province, Iran

== Qazvin Province ==
- Bahramabad, Abyek, a village in Abyek County, Qazvin Province, Iran
- Bahramabad, Qazvin, a village in Qazvin County, Qazvin Province, Iran
- Bahramabad-e Qaqazan, a village in Qazvin County, Qazvin Province, Iran

== Razavi Khorasan Province ==
- Bahramabad, Razavi Khorasan, a village in Mashhad County, Razavi Khroasan Province, Iran

== Sistan and Baluchestan Province ==
- Bahramabad, Sistan and Baluchestan, a village in Sistan and Baluchestan Province, Iran

== Tehran Province ==
- Bahramabad, Tehran, a village in Tehran Province, Iran

== West Azerbaijan Province ==
- Bahramabad, West Azerbaijan, a village in Naqadeh County

== See also ==
- Beyramabad (disambiguation)
