= Baharabad =

Baharabad (Persian: بهاراباد) may refer to:

- Baharabad, Azerbaijan
- Baharabad, Lorestan, Iran
- Baharabad, Mazandaran, Iran
- Baharabad, alternate name of Bahaabad, Semnan, Iran
- Chaqa Bahram, Iran
- Baharabad, West Azerbaijan
