= Heshmatabad =

Heshmatabad or Hashmatabad (Persian: حشمت‌ آباد) may refer to:

- Heshmatabad, Fars
- Heshmatabad, Gilan
- Heshmatabad, Kerman
- Heshmatabad, Dorud, Lorestan Province
- Heshmatabad, Silakhor, Dorud County, Lorestan Province
- Heshmatabad, Torbat-e Heydarieh, Razavi Khorasan Province
- Heshmatabad, Zaveh, Razavi Khorasan Province
- Heshmatabad, Yazd
- Heshmatabad Rural District
- Heshmatabad, alternate name of Seyyed Heshmat
