= Silakhor =

Silakhor (Persian: سيلاخور) may also refer to:

- Silakhor-e Olya, a village
- Silakhor-e Sofla, a village
- Silakhor District
- Silakhor Plain
- Silakhor Rural District
- Silakhor-e Sharqi Rural District
