= Sirinjeh =

Sirinjeh or Soranjeh or Serenjeh or Sarenjeh or Saranjeh or Sarinjeh (Persian: سرنجه) may refer to:

- Saranjeh, Kerman, a village in Ravar County, Kerman Province, Iran
- Sirinjeh, Borujerd, a village in Borujerd County, Lorestan Province, Iran
- Soranjeh, Dorud, a village in Dorud County, Lorestan Province, Iran
- Soranjeh, Khorramabad, a village in Khorramabad County, Lorestan Province, Iran
- Sarenjeh-ye Zivdar, a village in Pol-e Dokhtar County, Lorestan Province, Iran
- Soranjeh, Selseleh, a village in Selseleh County, Lorestan Province, Iran
- Saranjeh-e Qolayi, a village in Selseleh County, Lorestan Province, Iran
