= Zargaran =

Zargaran (Persian: زرگران) may refer to:

- Zərgəran, a village in Azerbaijan
- Zargaran (Afghanistan), a village in Nangarhar Province, Afghanistan
- Zargaran, Ghazni, Afghanistan
- Zargaran, Marvdasht, Fars Province, Iran
- Zargaran, Lorestan, Iran
- Zargaran-e Olya, Iran
- Zargaran-e Sofla, Iran
