= Yengeh Hoseyn =

Yengeh Hoseyn ينگه حسين
- Village
- Location within Iran
- Coordinates: 33°35′28″N 49°10′22″E
- Country: Iran
- Province: Lorestan
- County: Dorud
- Bakhsh: Central
- Rural District: Zhan

Population (2006)
  - Total: 51
- Time zone: UTC+3:30 (IRST)
  - Summer (DST): UTC+4:30 (IRDT)

Yengeh Hoseyn (Persian: ينگه حسين, also Romanized as Yengeh Ḩoseyn, Yeng Ḩoseyn; also known as Leyg Ḩoseyn and Qal‘eh-ye Yengeh Ḩoseyn) is a village in Zhan Rural District, in the Central District of Dorud County, Lorestan Province, Iran. At the 2006 census, its population was 51, in 11 families.
