= Cheshmeh Sarnajeh =

Cheshmeh Sarnajeh چشمه سرنجه
- Village
- Location within Iran
- Coordinates: 33°27′30″N 49°04′00″E
- Country: Iran
- Province: Lorestan
- County: Dorud
- Bakhsh: Central
- Rural District: Dorud

Population (2006)
  - Total: 479
- Time zone: UTC+3:30 (IRST)
  - Summer (DST): UTC+4:30 (IRDT)

Cheshmeh Sarnajeh (Persian: چشمه سرنجه, also Romanized as Cheshmeh Serenjeh) is a village in Dorud Rural District, in the Central District of Dorud County, Lorestan Province, Iran. At the 2006 census, its population was 479, in 102 families.
