= Qaleh-ye Baha ol Din =

Qaleh-ye Baha ol Din قلعه بهاالدين
- Village
- Location within Iran
- Coordinates: 33°41′48″N 48°52′44″E
- Country: Iran
- Province: Lorestan
- County: Dorud
- Bakhsh: Silakhor
- Rural District: Chalanchulan

Population (2006)
  - Total: 226
- Time zone: UTC+3:30 (IRST)
  - Summer (DST): UTC+4:30 (IRDT)

Qaleh-ye Baha ol Din (Persian: قلعه بهاالدين, also Romanized as Qal‘eh-ye Bahā’ ol Dīn and Qal‘eh-ye Bahā’ od Dīn; also known as Qal‘eh Bādī, Qal‘eh Bāi, and Qal‘eh-ye Bāy) is a village in Chalanchulan Rural District, Silakhor District, Dorud County, Lorestan Province, Iran. At the 2006 census, its population was 226, in 57 families.
