= Davarijan =

Davarijan دواريجان
- Village
- Location within Iran
- Coordinates: 33°40′44″N 49°07′42″E
- Country: Iran
- Province: Lorestan
- County: Dorud
- Bakhsh: Silakhor
- Rural District: Silakhor

Population (2006)
  - Total: 192
- Time zone: UTC+3:30 (IRST)
  - Summer (DST): UTC+4:30 (IRDT)

Davarijan (Persian: دواريجان, also Romanized as Davārījān; also known as Bāmsar, Bāmsar-e Pā’īn, and Ḩedārījān) is a village in Silakhor Rural District, Silakhor District, Dorud County, Lorestan Province, Iran. At the 2006 census, its population was 192, in 45 families.
