= Bagh-e Jamal =

Bagh-e Jamal باغ جمال
- Village
- Location within Iran
- Coordinates: 33°37′52″N 49°10′36″E
- Country: Iran
- Province: Lorestan
- County: Dorud
- Bakhsh: Central
- Rural District: Zhan

Population (2006)
  - Total: 57
- Time zone: UTC+3:30 (IRST)
  - Summer (DST): UTC+4:30 (IRDT)

Bagh-e Jamal (Persian: باغ جمال, also Romanized as Bāgh-e Jamāl, Bāgh Jamāl, and Bāgh-i-Jamāl) is a village in Zhan Rural District, in the Central District of Dorud County, Lorestan Province, Iran. At the 2006 census, its population was 57, in 18 families.
