= Saravand =

Saravand سراوند
- Village
- Location within Iran
- Coordinates: 33°22′24″N 49°10′02″E
- Country: Iran
- Province: Lorestan
- County: Dorud
- Bakhsh: Central
- Rural District: Heshmatabad

Population (2006)
  - Total: 295
- Time zone: UTC+3:30 (IRST)
  - Summer (DST): UTC+4:30 (IRDT)

Saravand (Persian: سراوند, also Romanized as Sarāvand and Sarāwand) is a village in Heshmatabad Rural District, in the Central District of Dorud County, Lorestan Province, Iran. At the 2006 census, its population was 295, in 67 families.
