= Darreh Esbar =

Darreh Esbar دره اسبر
- Village
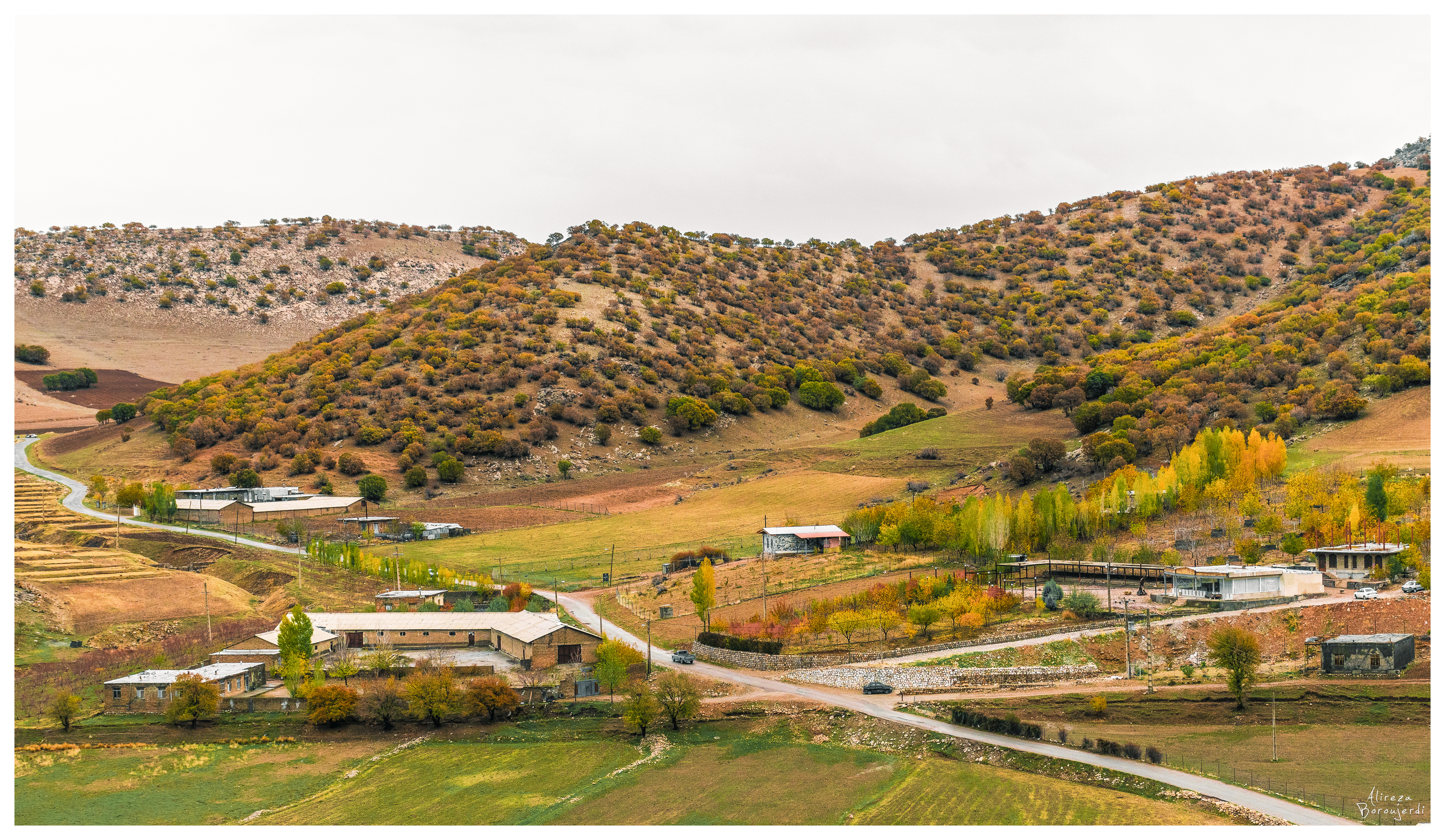
- Darreh Esbar

- Location within Iran
- Coordinates: 33°25′18″N 49°06′29″E
- Country: Iran
- Province: Lorestan
- County: Dorud
- Bakhsh: Central
- Rural District: Heshmatabad

Population (2006)
  - Total: 271
- Time zone: UTC+3:30 (IRST)
  - Summer (DST): UTC+4:30 (IRDT)

Darreh Esbar (Persian: دره اسبر, also Romanized as Darreh Esbar, Dar Āspar, Darreh Espar, and Darreh-ye Aspar) is a village in Heshmatabad Rural District, in the Central District of Dorud County, Lorestan Province, Iran. At the 2006 census, its population was 271, in 53 families.
