= Baba Khani =

Baba Khani (Persian: باباخاني) may refer to:

- Baba Khani, Fars
- Baba Khani, Dorud, Lorestan Province
- Baba Khani, Selseleh, Lorestan Province
