= Zarrin Khani =

Zarrin Khani زرين خاني
- Village
- Location within Iran
- Coordinates: 33°39′35″N 48°50′36″E
- Country: Iran
- Province: Lorestan
- County: Dorud
- Bakhsh: Silakhor
- Rural District: Chalanchulan

Population (2006)
  - Total: 50
- Time zone: UTC+3:30 (IRST)
  - Summer (DST): UTC+4:30 (IRDT)

Zarrin Khani (Persian: زرين خاني, also Romanized as Zarrīn Khānī and Zarrīn Khāneh) is a village in Chalanchulan Rural District, Silakhor District, Dorud County, Lorestan Province, Iran. At the 2006 census, its population was 50, in 15 families.
