= Khan Verdi =

Khan Verdi خانوردي
- Village
- Location within Iran
- Coordinates: 33°33′47″N 49°10′35″E
- Country: Iran
- Province: Lorestan
- County: Dorud
- Bakhsh: Central
- Rural District: Zhan

Population (2006)
  - Total: 127
- Time zone: UTC+3:30 (IRST)
  - Summer (DST): UTC+4:30 (IRDT)

Khan Verdi (Persian: خانوردي, also Romanized as Khān Verdī) is a village in Zhan Rural District, in the Central District of Dorud County, Lorestan Province, Iran. At the 2006 census, its population was 127, in 23 families.
