= Sabandan =

Sabandan سابندان
- Village
- Location within Iran
- Coordinates: 33°31′30″N 49°07′48″E
- Country: Iran
- Province: Lorestan
- County: Dorud
- Bakhsh: Central
- Rural District: Zhan

Population (2006)
  - Total: 350
- Time zone: UTC+3:30 (IRST)
  - Summer (DST): UTC+4:30 (IRDT)

Sabandan (Persian: سابندان, also Romanized as Sānbadān; also known as Sūneh Verdī) is a village in Zhan Rural District, in the Central District of Dorud County, Lorestan Province, Iran. At the 2006 census, its population was 350, in 76 families.
