= Naser ol Din =

Naser ol Din ناصرالدين
- Village
- Location within Iran
- Coordinates: 33°30′10″N 49°05′02″E
- Country: Iran
- Province: Lorestan
- County: Dorud
- Bakhsh: Central
- Rural District: Zhan

Population (2006)
  - Total: 9,148
- Time zone: UTC+3:30 (IRST)
  - Summer (DST): UTC+4:30 (IRDT)

Naser ol Din (Persian: ناصرالدين, also Romanized as Nāşer ol Dīn; also known as Nāşer od Dīn and Nāsirdīn) is a village in Zhan Rural District, in the Central District of Dorud County, Lorestan Province, Iran. At the 2006 census, its population was 9,148, in 1,942 families.
