= Baba Mohammad =

Baba Mohammad بابامحمد
- Village
- Location within Iran
- Coordinates: 33°35′20″N 49°06′06″E
- Country: Iran
- Province: Lorestan
- County: Dorud
- Bakhsh: Central
- Rural District: Zhan

Population (2006)
  - Total: 88
- Time zone: UTC+3:30 (IRST)
  - Summer (DST): UTC+4:30 (IRDT)

Baba Mohammad (Persian: بابامحمد, also Romanized as Bābā Moḩammad) is a village in Zhan Rural District, in the Central District of Dorud County, Lorestan Province, Iran. At the 2006 census, its population was 88, in 19 families.
