= Torshab =

Torshab or Torsh Ab may refer to:

- Torshab-e Bala, Kerman province
- Torshab, Lorestan
- Torshab Lake, lake in Kerman province of Iran
- Torshab, Sistan and Baluchestan
- Torsh Ab, alternate name of Toros Ab, South Khorasan province
- Torshab-e Olya, South Khorasan province
