= Khargush Khani =

Khargush Khani خرگوش خاني
- Village
- Location within Iran
- Coordinates: 33°29′55″N 49°13′28″E
- Country: Iran
- Province: Lorestan
- County: Dorud
- Bakhsh: Central
- Rural District: Heshmatabad

Population (2006)
  - Total: 44
- Time zone: UTC+3:30 (IRST)
  - Summer (DST): UTC+4:30 (IRDT)

Khargush Khani (Persian: خرگوش خاني, also Romanized as Khargūsh Khānī and Khargūsh Khūnī) is a village in Heshmatabad Rural District, in the Central District of Dorud County, Lorestan Province, Iran. At the 2006 census, its population was 44, in 11 families.
