= Hamyaneh =

Hamyaneh هميانه
- Village
- Location within Iran
- Coordinates: 33°40′20″N 48°59′01″E
- Country: Iran
- Province: Lorestan
- County: Dorud
- Bakhsh: Silakhor
- Rural District: Silakhor

Population (2006)
  - Total: 119
- Time zone: UTC+3:30 (IRST)
  - Summer (DST): UTC+4:30 (IRDT)

Hamyaneh (Persian: هميانه, also Romanized as Hamyāneh and Hamiyāna; also known as Hambāneh) is a village in Silakhor Rural District, Silakhor District, Dorud County, Lorestan Province, Iran. At the 2006 census, its population was 119, in 32 families.
