= Seyavel =

Seyavel سياول
- Village
- Location within Iran
- Coordinates: 33°30′44″N 49°04′16″E
- Country: Iran
- Province: Lorestan
- County: Dorud
- Bakhsh: Central
- Rural District: Zhan

Population (2006)
  - Total: 266
- Time zone: UTC+3:30 (IRST)
  - Summer (DST): UTC+4:30 (IRDT)

Seyavel (Persian: سياول, also Romanized as Seyāvel, Sīāval, Siyāwal, and Sīāh Val) is a village in Zhan Rural District, in the Central District of Dorud County, Lorestan Province, Iran. At the 2006 census, its population was 266, in 52 families.
