= Afravandeh =

Afravandeh افراونده
- Village
- Location within Iran
- Coordinates: 33°41′55″N 48°57′47″E
- Country: Iran
- Province: Lorestan
- County: Dorud
- Bakhsh: Silakhor
- Rural District: Chalanchulan

Population (2006)
  - Total: 567
- Time zone: UTC+3:30 (IRST)
  - Summer (DST): UTC+4:30 (IRDT)

Afravandeh (Persian: افراونده, also Romanized as Afrāvandeh; also known as Afrāneh and Farāvandeh) is a village in Chalanchulan Rural District, Silakhor District, Dorud County, Lorestan Province, Iran. At the 2006 census, its population was 567, in 142 families.
