= Qaleh-ye Kamohammad Reza =

Qaleh-ye Kamohammad Reza قلعه كامحمدرضا
- Village
- Location within Iran
- Coordinates: 33°31′30″N 49°03′45″E
- Country: Iran
- Province: Lorestan
- County: Dorud
- Bakhsh: Central
- Rural District: Zhan

Population (2006)
  - Total: 187
- Time zone: UTC+3:30 (IRST)
  - Summer (DST): UTC+4:30 (IRDT)

Qaleh-ye Kamohammad Reza (Persian: قلعه كامحمدرضا, also Romanized as Qal‘eh-ye Kāmoḩammad Reẕā; also known as Qal‘eh-ye Kāmoḩammad Ẕīā) is a village in Zhan Rural District, in the Central District of Dorud County, Lorestan Province, Iran. At the 2006 census, its population was 187, in 39 families.
