= Qaleh-ye Jahangir =

Qaleh-ye Jahangir قلعه جهانگير
- Village
- Location within Iran
- Coordinates: 33°37′05″N 49°05′47″E
- Country: Iran
- Province: Lorestan
- County: Dorud
- Bakhsh: Central
- Rural District: Zhan

Population (2006)
  - Total: 84
- Time zone: UTC+3:30 (IRST)
  - Summer (DST): UTC+4:30 (IRDT)

Qaleh-ye Jahangir (Persian: قلعه جهانگير, also Romanized as Qal‘eh-ye Jahāngīr; also known as Qal‘eh Jangi and Qal‘eh-ye Jangī) is a village in Zhan Rural District, in the Central District of Dorud County, Lorestan Province, Iran. At the 2006 census, its population was 84, in 20 families.
