= Ziveh Dar =

Ziveh Dar زيوه دار
- Village
- Location within Iran
- Coordinates: 33°38′31″N 48°51′58″E
- Country: Iran
- Province: Lorestan
- County: Dorud
- Bakhsh: Silakhor
- Rural District: Chalanchulan

Population (2006)
  - Total: 50
- Time zone: UTC+3:30 (IRST)
  - Summer (DST): UTC+4:30 (IRDT)

Ziveh Dar (Persian: زيوه دار, also Romanized as Zīveh Dār; also known as Sīveh Dar, Siwadar, Zīvar Dār, and Zobeydār) is a village in Chalanchulan Rural District, Silakhor District, Dorud County, Lorestan Province, Iran. At the 2006 census, its population was 50, in 11 families.
