= Yek Dang =

Yek Dang يكدانگ
- Village
- Location within Iran
- Coordinates: 33°42′01″N 48°52′24″E
- Country: Iran
- Province: Lorestan
- County: Dorud
- Bakhsh: Silakhor
- Rural District: Chalanchulan

Population (2006)
  - Total: 406
- Time zone: UTC+3:30 (IRST)
  - Summer (DST): UTC+4:30 (IRDT)

Yek Dang (Persian: يكدانگ, also Romanized as Yek Dāng and Yeg Dāng) is a village in Chalanchulan Rural District, Silakhor District, Dorud County, Lorestan Province, Iran. At the 2006 census, its population was 406, in 99 families.
