= Bamsar-e Bala =

Bamsar-e Bala بام سربالا
- Village
- Location within Iran
- Coordinates: 33°41′01″N 49°09′42″E
- Country: Iran
- Province: Lorestan
- County: Dorud
- Bakhsh: Central
- Rural District: Zhan

Population (2006)
  - Total: 50
- Time zone: UTC+3:30 (IRST)
  - Summer (DST): UTC+4:30 (IRDT)

Bamsar-e Bala (Persian: بام سربالا, also Romanized as Bāmsar-e Bālā; also known as Bām Sar and Bāmbar) is a village in Zhan Rural District, in the Central District of Dorud County, Lorestan Province, Iran. At the 2006 census, its population was 50, in 14 families.
