= Hamzeh Ali =

Hamzeh Ali حمزه علي
- Village
- Location within Iran
- Coordinates: 33°30′35″N 49°00′06″E
- Country: Iran
- Province: Lorestan
- County: Dorud
- Bakhsh: Central
- Rural District: Dorud

Population (2006)
  - Total: 24
- Time zone: UTC+3:30 (IRST)
  - Summer (DST): UTC+4:30 (IRDT)

Hamzeh Ali (Persian: حمزه علي, also Romanized as Hamzeh ʿAlī) is a village in Dorud Rural District, in the Central District of Dorud County, Lorestan Province, Iran. At the 2006 census, its population was 24, in 7 families.
