= Sarab bisheh =

Sarabisheh سراب بيشه
- Village
- Location within Iran
- Coordinates: 33°27′31″N 49°02′42″E
- Country: Iran
- Province: Lorestan
- County: Dorud
- Bakhsh: Central
- Rural District: Dorud

Population (2006)
  - Total: 55
- Time zone: UTC+3:30 (IRST)
  - Summer (DST): UTC+4:30 (IRDT)

Sarabisheh (Persian: سراب بيشه, also Romanized as Sarābīsheh, Sarāb Bījeh, Sarāb Bīsheh, (J)Oseph (C)Ohencheh, and Sarābīcheh) is a village in Dorud Rural District, in the Central District of Dorud County, Lorestan Province, Iran. At the 2006 census, its population was 55, in 9 families.
