= Daryab =

Daryab (Persian: دارياب) may refer to:

- Daryab, Hamadan
- Daryab, Kohgiluyeh and Boyer-Ahmad
- Daryab, Lorestan
