= Khosrowabad, Dorud =

Village in Lorestan province, Iran

Khosrowabad Persian: خسرو آباد
- Village
- Location within Iran
- Coordinates: 33°35′05″N 48°59′37″E
- Country: Iran
- Province: Lorestan
- County: Dorud
- District: Central
- Rural District: Dorud

Population (2016)
  - Total: 558
- Time zone: UTC+3:30 (IRST)

Khosrowabad (Persian: خسرو آباد) (Note: Also romanized as Khosrowābād) is a village in Dorud Rural District of the Central District in Dorud County, Lorestan province, Iran.

== Demographics ==
=== Population ===
At the time of the 2006 National Census, the village's population was 543 in 110 households. The following census in 2011 counted 567 people in 145 households. The 2016 census measured the population of the village as 558 people in 164 households.
