= Siah Kalleh =

Siah Kalleh or Siah Koleh (Persian: سياه كله) may refer to:

- Siah Koleh, Gilan
- Siah Kalleh, Lorestan
