= Chubdar-e Olya =

Chubdar-e Olya چوبدرعليا
- Village
- Location within Iran
- Coordinates: 33°37′27″N 49°08′09″E
- Country: Iran
- Province: Lorestan
- County: Dorud
- Bakhsh: Central
- Rural District: Zhan

Population (2006)
  - Total: 135
- Time zone: UTC+3:30 (IRST)
  - Summer (DST): UTC+4:30 (IRDT)

Chubdar-e Olya (Persian: چوبدرعليا, also Romanized as Chūbdar-e 'Olyā; also known as Chūbdār Bālā and Chūbdār-e Bālā) is a village in Zhan Rural District, in the Central District of Dorud County, Lorestan province, Iran. At the 2006 census, its population was 135, in 29 families.
