= Deh-e Hajji, Dorud =

Village in Lorestan province, Iran

Deh-e Hajji Persian: ده حاجي
- Village
- Location within Iran
- Coordinates: 33°41′11″N 48°52′59″E
- Country: Iran
- Province: Lorestan
- County: Dorud
- District: Silakhor
- Rural District: Chalanchulan

Population (2016)
  - Total: 403
- Time zone: UTC+3:30 (IRST)

Deh-e Hajji (Persian: ده حاجي) (Note: Also romanized as Deh Hājī and Deh-e Ḩājjī) is a village in Chalanchulan Rural District of Silakhor District in Dorud County, Lorestan province, Iran.

== Demographics ==
=== Population ===
At the time of the 2006 National Census, the village's population was 385 in 95 households. The following census in 2011 counted 298 people in 84 households. The 2016 census measured the population of the village as 403 people in 124 households.
