= Bagh Ali-ye Sofla =

Bagh Ali-ye Sofla باغ علي سفلي
- Village
- Location within Iran
- Coordinates: 33°35′48″N 49°07′40″E
- Country: Iran
- Province: Lorestan
- County: Dorud
- Bakhsh: Central
- Rural District: Zhan

Population (2006)
  - Total: 25
- Time zone: UTC+3:30 (IRST)
  - Summer (DST): UTC+4:30 (IRDT)

Bagh Ali-ye Sofla (Persian: باغ علي سفلي, also Romanized as Bāgh ‘Alī-ye Soflá and Bāgh-e ‘Alī-ye Soflá; also known as Bāgh ‘Alī-ye Pā’ īn) is a village in Zhan Rural District, in the Central District of Dorud County, Lorestan Province, Iran. At the 2006 census, its population was 25, in 6 families.
