= Laban-e Pain =

Village in Lorestan province, Iran

Laban-e Pain لبان پايين
- Village
- Location within Iran
- Coordinates: 33°35′07″N 48°58′03″E
- Country: Iran
- Province: Lorestan
- County: Dorud
- District: Silakhor
- Rural District: Silakhor

Population (2016)
  - Total: 176
- Time zone: UTC+3:30 (IRST)

Laban-e Pain (Persian: لبان سفلي) (Note: Also romanized as Labān-e Pā’īn; formerly known as Laban-e Sofla (لبان سفلي), also romanized as Labān-e Soflá; also known as Labān and Lavān-e Pā’īn) is a village in Silakhor Rural District of Silakhor District in Dorud County, Lorestan province, Iran.

== Demographics ==
=== Population ===
At the time of the 2006 National Census, the village's population, as Laban-e Sofla, was 176 in 43 households. The following census in 2011 counted 160 people in 47 households, by which time the village was listed as Laban-e Pain. The 2016 census measured the population of the village as 176 people in 53 households.
