= Suran, Lorestan =

Village in Lorestan province, Iran

Suran Persian: سوران
- Village
- Location within Iran
- Coordinates: 33°31′42″N 49°10′02″E
- Country: Iran
- Province: Lorestan
- County: Dorud
- District: Central
- Rural District: Zhan

Population (2016)
  - Total: 470
- Time zone: UTC+3:30 (IRST)

Suran (Persian: سوران) (Note: Also romanized as Sūrān; also known as Shūrān and Sūzān) is a village in Zhan Rural District of the Central District in Dorud County, Lorestan province, Iran.

== Demographics ==
=== Population ===
At the time of the 2006 National Census, the village's population was 515 in 107 households. The following census in 2011 counted 408 people in 103 households. The 2016 census measured the population of the village as 470 people in 124 households.
