= Sireh =

Sireh (Persian: سيره) may refer to:

- Sireh-ye Olya
- Sireh-ye Sofla
