= Darreh Zhan =

Darreh Zhan (Persian: دريژان) may refer to:

- Darreh Zhan-e Bala
- Darreh Zhan-e Pain
