= Chubdar-e Pain =

Chubdar-e Pain چوبدرپائين
- Village
- Location within Iran
- Coordinates: 33°38′56″N 49°09′12″E
- Country: Iran
- Province: Lorestan
- County: Dorud
- Bakhsh: Central
- Rural District: Zhan

Population (2006)
  - Total: 90
- Time zone: UTC+3:30 (IRST)
  - Summer (DST): UTC+4:30 (IRDT)

Chubdar-e Pain (Persian: چوبدرپائين, also Romanized as Chūbdār-e Pā’īn and Chūbdār Pā’īn; also known as Chūbdar-e Soflá) is a village in Zhan Rural District, in the Central District of Dorud County, Lorestan province, Iran. At the 2006 census, its population was 90, in 22 families.
