= Yazdgerd, Lorestan =

Yazdgerd يزدگرد
- Village
- Location within Iran
- Coordinates: 33°38′34″N 48°59′42″E
- Country: Iran
- Province: Lorestan
- County: Dorud
- Bakhsh: Silakhor
- Rural District: Silakhor

Population (2006)
  - Total: 62
- Time zone: UTC+3:30 (IRST)
  - Summer (DST): UTC+4:30 (IRDT)

Yazdgerd (Persian: يزدگرد, also Romanized as Yazdejerd, Yazdegerd, and Yazjerd) is a village in Silakhor Rural District, Silakhor District, Dorud County, Lorestan Province, Iran. At the 2006 census, its population was 62, in 16 families.
