= Deh Now, Dorud =

Village in Lorestan province, Iran

Deh Now Persian: ده نو
- Village
- Location within Iran
- Coordinates: 33°30′28″N 49°05′30″E
- Country: Iran
- Province: Lorestan
- County: Dorud
- District: Central
- Rural District: Zhan

Population (2016)
  - Total: 2,649
- Time zone: UTC+3:30 (IRST)

Deh Now (Persian: ده نو) (Note: Also romanized as Deh Nau) is a village in Zhan Rural District of the Central District in Dorud County, Lorestan province, Iran.

== Demographics ==
=== Population ===
At the time of the 2006 National Census, the village's population was 1,521 in 341 households. The following census in 2011 counted 2,435 people in 588 households. The 2016 census measured the population of the village as 2,649 people in 676 households, the most populous in its rural district.
