= Andikan =

Andikan انديكان
- Village
- Location within Iran
- Coordinates: 33°27′06″N 49°00′35″E
- Country: Iran
- Province: Lorestan
- County: Dorud
- Bakhsh: Central
- Rural District: Dorud

Population (2006)
  - Total: 50
- Time zone: UTC+3:30 (IRST)
  - Summer (DST): UTC+4:30 (IRDT)

Andikan (Persian: انديكان, also Romanized as Andīkān) is a village in Dorud Rural District, in the Central District of Dorud County, Lorestan Province, Iran. At the 2006 census, its population was 50, in 10 families.
