= Sireh-ye Sofla =

Sireh-ye Sofla سيره سفلي
- Village
- Location within Iran
- Coordinates: 33°25′07″N 49°09′45″E
- Country: Iran
- Province: Lorestan
- County: Dorud
- Bakhsh: Central
- Rural District: Heshmatabad

Population (2006)
  - Total: 92
- Time zone: UTC+3:30 (IRST)
  - Summer (DST): UTC+4:30 (IRDT)

Sireh-ye Sofla (Persian: سيره سفلي, also Romanized as Sīreh-ye Soflá; also known as Sīreh-ye Pā’īn) is a village in Heshmatabad Rural District, in the Central District of Dorud County, Lorestan Province, Iran. At the 2006 census, its population was 92, in 13 families.
