= Maruk =

Maruk may refer to:

- Dennis Maruk, Canadian former ice hockey player
- Maruk, Isfahan, a village in Iran
- Maruk, Lorestan, a village in Iran
- Maruk, South Khorasan, a village in Iran
