= Kagheh =

Village in Lorestan province, Iran

Kagheh کاغه
- Village
- Location within Iran
- Coordinates: 33°37′12″N 48°57′22″E
- Country: Iran
- Province: Lorestan
- County: Dorud
- District: Silakhor
- Rural District: Silakhor

Population (2016)
  - Total: 953
- Time zone: UTC+3:30 (IRST)

Kagheh (Persian: کاغه) (Note: Also romanized as Kāgheh) is a village in, and the capital of, Silakhor Rural District in Silakhor District of Dorud County, Lorestan province, Iran.

== Demographics ==
=== Population ===
At the time of the 2006 National Census, the village's population was 859 in 203 households. The following census in 2011 counted 953 people in 263 households. The 2016 census measured the population of the village as 953 people in 271 households, the most populous in its rural district.
