= Raken =

Raken may refer to:

- creatures in Wheel of Time; see Seanchan
- Raken-e Olya, village in Iran
- Raken-e Sofla, village in Iran
