= Choghadun =

Village in Lorestan province, Iran

Choghadun Persian: چغادون
- Village
- Location within Iran
- Coordinates: 33°29′15″N 49°09′58″E
- Country: Iran
- Province: Lorestan
- County: Dorud
- District: Central
- Rural District: Heshmatabad

Population (2016)
  - Total: 872
- Time zone: UTC+3:30 (IRST)

Choghadun (Persian: چغادون) (Note: Also romanized as Choghādūn; also known as Chaqādūn, Chughadun, Chūghādūn, and Chūqādūn) is a village in Heshmatabad Rural District of the Central District in Dorud County, Lorestan province, Iran.

== Demographics ==
=== Population ===
At the time of the 2006 National Census, the village's population was 355 in 85 households. The following census in 2011 counted 336 people in 101 households. The 2016 census measured the population of the village as 872 people in 111 households.
