= Pahlavan Kal =

Village in Lorestan province, Iran

Pahlavan Kal Persian: پهلوان كل
- Village
- Location within Iran
- Coordinates: 33°39′01″N 48°52′46″E
- Country: Iran
- Province: Lorestan
- County: Dorud
- District: Silakhor
- Rural District: Chalanchulan

Population (2016)
  - Total: 565
- Time zone: UTC+3:30 (IRST)

Pahlavan Kal (Persian: پهلوان كل) (Note: Also romanized as Pahlavān Kal and Pahlwan Kal) is a village in Chalanchulan Rural District of Silakhor District in Dorud County, Lorestan province, Iran.

== Demographics ==
=== Population ===
At the time of the 2006 National Census, the village's population was 551 in 144 households. The following census in 2011 counted 570 people in 170 households. The 2016 census measured the population of the village as 565 people in 170 households.
