= Sandarkan =

Village in Lorestan province, Iran

Sandarkan Persian: سندركان
- Village
- Location within Iran
- Coordinates: 33°32′52″N 48°59′41″E
- Country: Iran
- Province: Lorestan
- County: Dorud
- District: Central
- Rural District: Dorud

Population (2016)
  - Total: 538
- Time zone: UTC+3:30 (IRST)

Sandarkan (Persian: سندركان) (Note: Also romanized as Sandarkān, Sanderkān, Sendarkān, and Senderkān; also known as Sand Zakān) is a village in Dorud Rural District of the Central District in Dorud County, Lorestan province, Iran.

== Demographics ==
=== Population ===
At the time of the 2006 National Census, the village's population was 412 in 85 households. The following census in 2011 counted 537 people in 142 households. The 2016 census measured the population of the village as 538 people in 145 households.
