= Bagh Ali-ye Olya =

Bagh Ali-ye Olya باغ علي عليا
- Village
- Location within Iran
- Coordinates: 33°36′24″N 49°06′45″E
- Country: Iran
- Province: Lorestan
- County: Dorud
- Bakhsh: Central
- Rural District: Zhan

Population (2006)
  - Total: 52
- Time zone: UTC+3:30 (IRST)
  - Summer (DST): UTC+4:30 (IRDT)

Bagh Ali-ye Olya (Persian: باغ علي عليا, also Romanized as Bāgh ‘Alī-ye ‘Olyā and Bāgh-e ‘Alī-ye ‘Olyā; also known as Bāgh ‘Alī-ye Bālā) is a village in Zhan Rural District, in the Central District of Dorud County, Lorestan Province, Iran. At the 2006 census, its population was 52, in 11 families.
