= Garazh, Dorud =

Garazh گاراژ
- Village
- Location within Iran
- Coordinates: 33°38′32″N 48°54′04″E
- Country: Iran
- Province: Lorestan
- County: Dorud
- Bakhsh: Silakhor
- Rural District: Chalanchulan

Population (2006)
  - Total: 375
- Time zone: UTC+3:30 (IRST)
  - Summer (DST): UTC+4:30 (IRDT)

Garazh (Persian: گاراژ, also Romanized as Gārāzh; also known as Gārāzh-e Pol and Gārāzhīl) is a village in Chalanchulan Rural District, Silakhor District, Dorud County, Lorestan Province, Iran. According to the 2006 census, its population was 375, in 98 families.
