= Raken-e Olya =

Raken-e Olya راكن عليا
- Village
- Location within Iran
- Coordinates: 33°25′52″N 49°01′13″E
- Country: Iran
- Province: Lorestan
- County: Dorud
- Bakhsh: Central
- Rural District: Dorud

Population (2006)
  - Total: 43
- Time zone: UTC+3:30 (IRST)
  - Summer (DST): UTC+4:30 (IRDT)

Raken-e Olya (Persian: راكن عليا, also Romanized as Rāken-e ‘Olyā; also known as Rāken-e Bālā) is a village in Dorud Rural District, in the Central District of Dorud County, Lorestan Province, Iran. At the 2006 census, its population was 43, in 7 families.
