= Darreh Zhan-e Bala =

Darreh Zhan-e Bala دريژان بالا
- Village
- Location within Iran
- Coordinates: 33°35′14″N 49°15′15″E
- Country: Iran
- Province: Lorestan
- County: Dorud
- Bakhsh: Central
- Rural District: Zhan

Population (2006)
  - Total: 295
- Time zone: UTC+3:30 (IRST)
  - Summer (DST): UTC+4:30 (IRDT)

Darreh Zhan-e Bala (Persian: دريژان بالا, also Romanized as Darreh Zhān-e Bālā and Darreh Zhān Bālā; also known as Darīzhān 'Olyā, Darreh Zhān, Darreh Zhan 'Olyā and Dīzhān-e 'Olyā) is a village in Zhan Rural District, in the Central District of Dorud County, Lorestan province, Iran. At the 2006 census, its population was 295, in 72 families.
