= Baba Khani, Dorud =

Baba Khani باباخاني
- village
- Location within Iran
- Coordinates: 33°32′28″N 49°00′21″E
- Country: Iran
- Province: Lorestan
- County: Dorud
- Bakhsh: Central
- Rural District: Dorud

Population (2006)
  - Total: 280
- Time zone: UTC+3:30 (IRST)
  - Summer (DST): UTC+4:30 (IRDT)

Baba Khani (Persian: باباخاني, also Romanized as Bābā Khānī and Bāba Khūni) is a village in Dorud Rural District, in the Central District of Dorud County, Lorestan Province, Iran. At the 2006 census, its population was 280, in 66 families.
