= Kalanganeh =

Village in Lorestan province, Iran

Kalanganeh كلنگانه
- Village
- Location within Iran
- Coordinates: 33°37′20″N 48°54′51″E
- Country: Iran
- Province: Lorestan
- County: Dorud
- District: Silakhor
- Rural District: Silakhor

Population (2016)
  - Total: 594
- Time zone: UTC+3:30 (IRST)

Kalanganeh (Persian: كلنگانه) (Note: Also romanized as Kalangāneh and Kolangāneh; also known as Galangāneh, Gīlangān, and Kalangona) is a village in Silakhor Rural District of Silakhor District in Dorud County, Lorestan province, Iran.

== Demographics ==
=== Population ===
At the time of the 2006 National Census, the village's population was 606 in 157 households. The following census in 2011 counted 616 people in 170 households. The 2016 census measured the population of the village as 594 people in 178 households.
