= Garazh =

Garazh may refer to:

- The Garage (1979 film), a Soviet film
- Garazh, Dorud, a village in Iran
- Garazh, Khorramabad, a village in Iran
