= Push Kashan =

Village in Lorestan province, Iran

Push Kashan پوش كشان
- Village
- Location within Iran
- Coordinates: 33°35′53″N 48°58′09″E
- Country: Iran
- Province: Lorestan
- County: Dorud
- District: Silakhor
- Rural District: Silakhor

Population (2016)
  - Total: 420
- Time zone: UTC+3:30 (IRST)

Push Kashan (Persian: پوش كشان) (Note: Also romanized as Pūsh Kashān; also known as Pesh Kashun, Pīshkashān, and Pīshkoshūn) is a village in Silakhor Rural District of Silakhor District in Dorud County, Lorestan province, Iran.

== Demographics ==
=== Population ===
At the time of the 2006 National Census, the village's population was 424 in 91 households. The following census in 2011 counted 443 people in 122 households. The 2016 census measured the population of the village as 420 people in 131 households.
