= Raken-e Sofla =

Raken-e Sofla راكن سفلي
- Village
- Location within Iran
- Coordinates: 33°25′31″N 49°00′31″E
- Country: Iran
- Province: Lorestan
- County: Dorud
- Bakhsh: Central
- Rural District: Dorud

Population (2006)
  - Total: 101
- Time zone: UTC+3:30 (IRST)
  - Summer (DST): UTC+4:30 (IRDT)

Raken-e Sofla (Persian: راكن سفلي, also Romanized as Rāken-e Soflá; also known as Rāken-e Pā’īn) is a village in Dorud Rural District, in the Central District of Dorud County, Lorestan Province, Iran. At the 2006 census, its population was 101, in 19 families.
