= Laban-e Bala =

Village in Lorestan province, Iran

Laban-e Bala لبان بالا
- Village
- Location within Iran
- Coordinates: 33°35′11″N 48°57′28″E
- Country: Iran
- Province: Lorestan
- County: Dorud
- District: Silakhor
- Rural District: Silakhor

Population (2016)
  - Total: 363
- Time zone: UTC+3:30 (IRST)

Laban-e Bala (Persian: لبان بالا) (Note: Also romanized as Labān-e Bālā; formerly known as Laban-e Olya (لبان عليا), also romanized as Labān-e ‘Olyā) is a village in Silakhor Rural District of Silakhor District in Dorud County, Lorestan province, Iran.

== Demographics ==
=== Population ===
At the time of the 2006 National Census, the village's population, as Laban-e Olya, was 308 in 73 households. The following census in 2011 counted 281 people in 81 households, by which time the village was listed as Laban-e Bala. The 2016 census measured the population of the village as 363 people in 110 households.
