= Chaqa Bahram =

Chaqa Bahram چقابهرام
- Village
- Location within Iran
- Coordinates: 33°32′19″N 49°05′12″E
- Country: Iran
- Province: Lorestan
- County: Dorud
- Bakhsh: Central
- Rural District: Zhan

Population (2006)
  - Total: 319
- Time zone: UTC+3:30 (IRST)
  - Summer (DST): UTC+4:30 (IRDT)

Chaqa Bahram (Persian: چقابهرام, also Romanized as Chaqā Bahrām, Cheqā bahrām, Choghā Bahrām, Choghā Bahrām, and Choqā Bahrām; also known as Bahārābād) is a village in Zhan Rural District, in the Central District of Dorud County, Lorestan Province, Iran. At the 2006 census, its population was 319, in 75 families.
