= Baba Pashman =

Baba Pashman باباپشمان
- Village
- Location within Iran
- Coordinates: 33°40′13″N 48°51′45″E
- Country: Iran
- Province: Lorestan
- County: Dorud
- Bakhsh: Silakhor
- Rural District: Chalanchulan

Population (2006)
  - Total: 228
- Time zone: UTC+3:30 (IRST)
  - Summer (DST): UTC+4:30 (IRDT)

Baba Pashman (Persian: باباپشمان, also Romanized as Bābā Pashmān, Bābā Pashīmān, and Bāba Poshmān) is a village in Chalanchulan Rural District, Silakhor District, Dorud County, Lorestan Province, Iran. At the 2006 census, its population was 228, in 61 families.
