= Beyramabad =

Beyramabad or Bayramabad (Persian: بيرم اباد) may refer to:

- Beyramabad, North Khorasan
- Beyramabad, Firuzeh, in Razavi Khorasan Province
- Beyramabad, Mashhad, in Razavi Khorasan Province

== See also ==
- Bahramabad (disambiguation)
