= Emarat, Lorestan =

Village in Lorestan province, Iran

Emarat Persian: عمارت
- Village
- Location within Iran
- Coordinates: 33°20′43″N 49°02′14″E
- Country: Iran
- Province: Lorestan
- County: Dorud
- District: Central
- Rural District: Dorud

Population (2016)
  - Total: 612
- Time zone: UTC+3:30 (IRST)

Emarat (Persian: عمارت) (Note: Also romanized as ‘Amārat and ‘Emārat) is a village in Dorud Rural District of the Central District in Dorud County, Lorestan province, Iran.

== Demographics ==
=== Population ===
At the time of the 2006 National Census, the village's population was 352 in 77 households. The following census in 2011 counted 600 people in 130 households. The 2016 census measured the population of the village as 612 people in 153 households.
