= Zhan, Lorestan =

Village in Lorestan province, Iran

Zhan Persian: ژان
- Village
- Location within Iran
- Coordinates: 33°32′55″N 49°07′52″E
- Country: Iran
- Province: Lorestan
- County: Dorud
- District: Central
- Rural District: Zhan

Population (2016)
  - Total: 1,945
- Time zone: UTC+3:30 (IRST)

Zhan (Persian: ژان; pronounced [ʒɒːn]) (Note: Also romanized as Žān and Zhān) is a village in, and the capital of, Zhan Rural District in the Central District of Dorud County, Lorestan province, Iran.

== Demographics ==
=== Population ===
At the time of the 2006 National Census, the village's population was 1,524 in 334 households. The following census in 2011 counted 1,535 people in 388 households. The 2016 census measured the population of the village as 1,945 people in 534 households.
