= Amirabad, Dorud (northern) =

Village in Lorestan province, Iran

Amirabad Persian: اميرآباد
- Village
- Location within Iran
- Coordinates: 33°34′17″N 49°00′20″E
- Country: Iran
- Province: Lorestan
- County: Dorud
- District: Central
- Rural District: Dorud

Population (2016)
  - Total: 537
- Time zone: UTC+3:30 (IRST)

Amirabad (Persian: اميرآباد) (Note: Also romanized as Amīrābād; also known as Mīrābād) is a village in Dorud Rural District of the Central District in Dorud County, Lorestan province, Iran.

== Demographics ==
=== Population ===
At the time of the 2006 National Census, the village's population was 477 in 83 households. The following census in 2011 counted 498 people in 123 households. The 2016 census measured the population of the village as 537 people in 141 households.
