= Razvar =

Village in Lorestan province, Iran

Razvar Persian: رضور
- Village
- Location within Iran
- Coordinates: 33°26′22″N 49°13′00″E
- Country: Iran
- Province: Lorestan
- County: Dorud
- District: Central
- Rural District: Heshmatabad

Population (2016)
  - Total: 434
- Time zone: UTC+3:30 (IRST)

Razvar (Persian: رضور) (Note: Also known as Razdar and Zarūr) is a village in Heshmatabad Rural District of the Central District in Dorud County, Lorestan province, Iran.

== Demographics ==
=== Population ===
At the time of the 2006 National Census, the village's population was 368 in 85 households. The following census in 2011 counted 439 people in 98 households. The 2016 census measured the population of the village as 434 people in 116 households.
