= Sireh-ye Olya =

Sireh-ye Olya سيره عليا
- Village
- Location within Iran
- Coordinates: 33°24′41″N 49°09′49″E
- Country: Iran
- Province: Lorestan
- County: Dorud
- Bakhsh: Central
- Rural District: Heshmatabad

Population (2006)
  - Total: 25
- Time zone: UTC+3:30 (IRST)
  - Summer (DST): UTC+4:30 (IRDT)

Sireh-ye Olya (Persian: سيره عليا, also Romanized as Sīreh-ye ‘Olyā; also known as Lāsūreh-ye ‘Olyā and Sīreh-ye Bālā) is a village in Heshmatabad Rural District, in the Central District of Dorud County, Lorestan Province, Iran. At the 2006 census, its population was 25, in 5 families.
