= Hajjiabad-e Yarahmadi =

Village in Lorestan province, Iran

Hajjiabad-e Yarahmadi Persian: حاجي آباد ياراحمدي
- Village
- Location within Iran
- Coordinates: 33°43′34″N 48°52′17″E
- Country: Iran
- Province: Lorestan
- County: Dorud
- District: Silakhor
- Rural District: Chalanchulan

Population (2016)
  - Total: 407
- Time zone: UTC+3:30 (IRST)

Hajjiabad-e Yarahmadi (Persian: حاجي آباد ياراحمدي) (Note: Also romanized as Ḩājjīābād-e Yāraḩmadī; also known as Ḩājīābād and Hājjīābād) is a village in Chalanchulan Rural District of Silakhor District in Dorud County, Lorestan province, Iran.

== Demographics ==
=== Population ===
At the time of the 2006 National Census, the village's population was 476 in 122 households. The following census in 2011 counted 621 people in 168 households. The 2016 census measured the population of the village as 407 people in 121 households.
