= Andika =

Andika may refer to:

- Andika County, a county in the province of Khuzestan, Iran
- Andika (typeface), a typeface developed for Latin, Greek, and Cyrillic scripts

Andika or Andhika may also refer to:

== People ==
=== Given name ===
- Andhika Ramadhani (born 1999), Indonesian footballer
- Andika Eka Putra (died 2016), Indonesian militant
- Andika Hazrumy (born 1985), Indonesian politician; 4th Vice Governor of Banten (2017–2022)
- Andika Kurniawan (born 1995), Indonesian footballer
- Andika Naliputra (born 1980), Indonesian musician
- Andika Perkasa (born 1964), Indonesian military general; 21st Commander of the Indonesian National Armed Forces (2021–2022); 32nd Chief of Staff of the Indonesian Army (2018–2021); 39th Commander of Army Strategic Reserve Command (2018)
- Andika Ramadiansyah (born 1998), Indonesian badminton player
- I Made Andhika Wijaya (born 1996), Indonesian footballer

=== Surname ===
- Firza Andika (born 1999), Indonesian footballer
- Roby Andika (born 1999), Indonesian footballer

== Other uses ==
- Andika, a supporting character from television series The East
- The Andika, a refugee ship arrived in New Zealand

== See also ==
- Andikalamos, a village in the region of Peloponnese, Greece
- Andikan, a village in the province of Lorestan, Iran
- Andikayi, a village in the province of Khuzestan, Iran
- Andhaka, a Hindu demigod
