= Silabkhor =

Silabkhor (Persian: سيلابخور), also rendered as Seilabkhor or Seylabkhvor, may refer to:

- Silabkhor-e Bala
- Silabkhor-e Pain
