= Beyatan, Dorud =

Village in Lorestan province, Iran

Beyatan Persian: بياتان
- Village
- Location within Iran
- Coordinates: 33°42′24″N 48°58′49″E
- Country: Iran
- Province: Lorestan
- County: Dorud
- District: Silakhor
- Rural District: Chalanchulan

Population (2016)
  - Total: 538
- Time zone: UTC+3:30 (IRST)

Beyatan (Persian: بياتان) (Note: Also romanized as Beyātān; also known as Bayatan, Bayātān, Bayātūn, and Beyātūn) is a village in Chalanchulan Rural District of Silakhor District in Dorud County, Lorestan province, Iran.

== Demographics ==
=== Population ===
At the time of the 2006 National Census, the village's population was 801 in 188 households. The following census in 2011 counted 679 people in 186 households. The 2016 census measured the population of the village as 538 people in 168 households.
