= Azna, Dorud =

Village in Lorestan province, Iran

Azna ازنا
- Village
- Location within Iran
- Coordinates: 33°36′32″N 48°55′44″E
- Country: Iran
- Province: Lorestan
- County: Dorud
- District: Silakhor
- Rural District: Silakhor

Population (2016)
  - Total: 502
- Time zone: UTC+3:30 (IRST)

Azna (Persian: ازنا) (Note: Also romanized as Aznā) is a village in Silakhor Rural District of Silakhor District in Dorud County, Lorestan province, Iran.

== Demographics ==
=== Population ===
At the time of the 2006 National Census, the village's population was 463 in 129 households. The following census in 2011 counted 455 people in 131 households. The 2016 census measured the population of the village as 502 people in 162 households.
