= Gol-e Gurchak =

Village in Lorestan province, Iran

Gol-e Gurchak Persian: گل گورچك
- Village
- Location within Iran
- Coordinates: 33°33′16″N 49°09′17″E
- Country: Iran
- Province: Lorestan
- County: Dorud
- District: Central
- Rural District: Zhan

Population (2016)
  - Total: 499
- Time zone: UTC+3:30 (IRST)

Gol-e Gurchak (Persian: گل گورچك) (Note: Also romanized as Gel-e Gurchak, Gel-e Gūrchak, and Gol-e Gūrchak; also known as Gol Gūrchak-e Bālā, Gūrchak, Qal‘eh Gīrshāh, and Qal‘eh-ye Gīr Shāh) is a village in Zhan Rural District of the Central District in Dorud County, Lorestan province, Iran.

== Demographics ==
=== Population ===
At the time of the 2006 National Census, the village's population was 469 in 91 households. The following census in 2011 counted 508 people in 138 households. The 2016 census measured the population of the village as 499 people in 140 households.
