= Zirtang =

Zirtang (Persian: زيرتنگ) may refer to:

- Zirtang Rural District
- Zirtang-e Chameshk
- Zir Tang, Ilam
- Zir Tang, Lorestan
- Zir Tang-e Khayyat
