= Gav Koshteh =

Village in Lorestan province, Iran

Gav Koshteh Persian: گاوكشته
- Village
- Location within Iran
- Coordinates: 33°28′09″N 49°10′32″E
- Country: Iran
- Province: Lorestan
- County: Dorud
- District: Central
- Rural District: Heshmatabad

Population (2016)
  - Total: 388
- Time zone: UTC+3:30 (IRST)

Gav Koshteh (Persian: گاوكشته) (Note: Also romanized as Gāv Koshtéh and Gāv Koshteh; also known as Gāv Kosheh) is a village in Heshmatabad Rural District of the Central District in Dorud County, Lorestan province, Iran.

== Demographics ==
=== Population ===
At the time of the 2006 National Census, the village's population was 403 in 92 households. The following census in 2011 counted 402 people in 117 households. The 2016 census measured the population of the village as 388 people in 115 households.
