= Chubdar =

Chubdar may refer to:

- Chubdar-e Olya, a village in Iran
- Chubdar-e Pain, a village in Iran
