= Darreh Zhan-e Pain =

Village in Lorestan, Iran

Darreh Zhan-e Pain دريژان پائين
- Village
- Location within Iran
- Coordinates: 33°34′20″N 49°13′37″E
- Country: Iran
- Province: Lorestan
- County: Dorud
- Bakhsh: Central
- Rural District: Zhan

Population (2006)
  - Total: 362
- Time zone: UTC+3:30 (IRST)
  - Summer (DST): UTC+4:30 (IRDT)

Darreh Zhan-e Pain (Persian: دريژان پائين, also Romanized as Darreh Zhān-e Pā’īn and Darreh Zhān Pā’īn; also known as Darīzhān-e Pā’īn, Darīzhān-e Soflá, and Darreh Zhān Soflá) is a village in Zhan Rural District, in the Central District of Dorud County, Lorestan province, Iran. At the 2006 census, its population was 362, in 87 families.
