= Karkhaneh Sefid Kan =

Village in Lorestan province, Iran

Karkhaneh Sefid Kan Persian: كارخانه سفيدكن
- Village
- Location within Iran
- Coordinates: 33°43′14″N 48°50′46″E
- Country: Iran
- Province: Lorestan
- County: Dorud
- District: Silakhor
- Rural District: Chalanchulan

Population (2016)
  - Total: 578
- Time zone: UTC+3:30 (IRST)

Karkhaneh Sefid Kan (Persian: كارخانه سفيدكن) (Note: Also romanized as Kārkhāneh Sefīd Kan, Kārkhāneh-ye Sefīd Kan, and Kārkhāneh-ye Sefīd Kon; also known as Kārkhāneh, Kārkhāneh-ye Sālār, and Khārkhāneh) is a village in Chalanchulan Rural District of Silakhor District in Dorud County, Lorestan province, Iran.

== Demographics ==
=== Population ===
At the time of the 2006 National Census, the village's population was 639 in 155 households. The following census in 2011 counted 572 people in 156 households. The 2016 census measured the population of the village as 578 people in 168 households.
