= Choqabdar =

Village in Lorestan province, Iran

Choqabdar Persian: چقابدار
- Village
- Location within Iran
- Coordinates: 33°31′13″N 49°01′29″E
- Country: Iran
- Province: Lorestan
- County: Dorud
- District: Central
- Rural District: Dorud

Population (2016)
  - Total: 4,441
- Time zone: UTC+3:30 (IRST)

Choqabdar (Persian: چقابدار) (Note: Also romanized as Choqābdār; also known as Cheghābdār) is a village in Dorud Rural District of the Central District in Dorud County, Lorestan province, Iran.

== Demographics ==
=== Population ===
At the time of the 2006 National Census, the village's population was 3,403 in 734 households. The following census in 2011 counted 5,513 people in 1,141 households. The 2016 census measured the population of the village as 4,441 people in 1,301 households. It was the most populous village in its rural district.
