= Bonakabad =

Village in Lorestan province, Iran

Bonakabad Persian: بنک آباد
- Village
- Location within Iran
- Coordinates: 33°29′20″N 49°06′20″E
- Country: Iran
- Province: Lorestan
- County: Dorud
- District: Central
- Rural District: Heshmatabad

Population (2016)
  - Total: 1,103
- Time zone: UTC+3:30 (IRST)

Bonakabad (Persian: بنک آباد0 (Note: Also romanized as Bonakābād and Bonkābād) is a village in Heshmatabad Rural District of the Central District in Dorud County, Lorestan province, Iran.

== Demographics ==
=== Population ===
At the time of the 2006 National Census, the village's population was 999 in 217 households. The following census in 2011 counted 1,175 people in 278 households. The 2016 census measured the population of the village as 1,103 people in 270 households.
