= Tanur Dar =

Village in Lorestan province, Iran

Tanur Dar Persian: تنوردر
- Village
- Location within Iran
- Coordinates: 33°34′28″N 49°02′57″E
- Country: Iran
- Province: Lorestan
- County: Dorud
- District: Central
- Rural District: Zhan

Population (2016)
  - Total: 637
- Time zone: UTC+3:30 (IRST)

Tanur Dar (Persian: تنوردر) (Note: Also romanized as Tanūr Dar; also known as Shūr Dar and Tanidar) is a village in Zhan Rural District of the Central District in Dorud County, Lorestan province, Iran.

== Demographics ==
=== Population ===
At the time of the 2006 National Census, the village's population was 564 in 99 households. The following census in 2011 counted 396 people in 87 households. The 2016 census measured the population of the village as 637 people in 163 households.
