= Gusheh-ye Pol =

Village in Lorestan province, Iran

Gusheh-ye Pol Persian: گوشه پل
- Village
- Location within Iran
- Coordinates: 33°33′33″N 48°58′58″E
- Country: Iran
- Province: Lorestan
- County: Dorud
- District: Central
- Rural District: Dorud

Population (2016)
  - Total: 550
- Time zone: UTC+3:30 (IRST)

Gusheh-ye Pol (Persian: گوشه پل) (Note: Also romanized as Gūsheh Pol, Gūshehpal, and Gūsheh-ye Pol) is a village in Dorud Rural District of the Central District in Dorud County, Lorestan province, Iran.

== Demographics ==
=== Population ===
At the time of the 2006 National Census, the village's population was 397 in 90 households. The following census in 2011 counted 522 people in 136 households. The 2016 census measured the population of the village as 550 people in 155 households.
