= Bagh Ali =

Bagh Ali (Persian: باغ علي) may refer to:

- Bagh Ali-ye Olya
- Bagh Ali-ye Sofla
