= Chamnar =

Village in Lorestan province, Iran

Chamnar Persian: چمنار
- Village
- Location within Iran
- Coordinates: 33°25′54″N 49°11′33″E
- Country: Iran
- Province: Lorestan
- County: Dorud
- District: Central
- Rural District: Heshmatabad

Population (2016)
  - Total: 488
- Time zone: UTC+3:30 (IRST)

Chamnar (Persian: چمنار) (Note: Also romanized as Chamanār and Chamnār) is a village in Heshmatabad Rural District of the Central District in Dorud County, Lorestan province, Iran.

== Demographics ==
=== Population ===
At the time of the 2006 National Census, the village's population was 514 in 106 households. The following census in 2011 counted 563 people in 130 households. The 2016 census measured the population of the village as 488 people in 129 households.
