= Havilan =

Havilan هاويلان
- Village
- Location within Iran
- Coordinates: 33°36′50″N 49°06′03″E
- Country: Iran
- Province: Lorestan
- County: Dorud
- Bakhsh: Central
- Rural District: Zhan

Population (2006)
  - Total: 63
- Time zone: UTC+3:30 (IRST)
  - Summer (DST): UTC+4:30 (IRDT)

Havilan (Persian: هاويلان, also Romanized as Ḩāvīlān; also known as Hāvīlā) is a village in Zhan Rural District, in the Central District of Dorud County, Lorestan Province, Iran. At the 2006 census, its population was 63, in 12 families.
