= Defense Industries Houses =

Village in Lorestan province, Iran

Defense Industries Houses Persian: خانه هاي صنايع دفاع
- Village
- Location within Iran
- Coordinates: 33°27′50″N 49°09′02″E
- Country: Iran
- Province: Lorestan
- County: Dorud
- District: Central
- Rural District: Heshmatabad

Population (2016)
  - Total: 1,308
- Time zone: UTC+3:30 (IRST)

Defense Industries Houses (Persian: خانه هاي صنايع دفاع) (Note: Also known as Bani Hashem Armor Industries (صنايع زرهي بني هاشم), Defense Industries Organizational Houses (خانه هاي سازماني صنايع دفاع), Shahrak-e Emam (شهرک امام), and Shahrak-e Emām) is a village in Heshmatabad Rural District of the Central District in Dorud County, Lorestan province, Iran.

== Demographics ==
=== Population ===
At the time of the 2006 National Census, the village's population, as Defense Industries Organizational Houses, was 2,369 in 647 households. The following census in 2011 counted 1,762 people in 466 households, by which time the village was listed as Defense Industries Houses. The 2016 census measured the population of the village as 1,308 people in 348 households. It was the most populous village in its rural district.
