= Azizabad, Dorud =

Village in Lorestan province, Iran

Azizabad عزيزآباد
- Village
- Location within Iran
- Coordinates: 33°36′03″N 48°54′24″E
- Country: Iran
- Province: Lorestan
- County: Dorud
- District: Silakhor
- Rural District: Silakhor

Population (2016)
  - Total: 341
- Time zone: UTC+3:30 (IRST)

Azizabad (Persian: عزيزآباد) (Note: Also romanized as ‘Azīzābād) is a village in Silakhor Rural District of Silakhor District in Dorud County, Lorestan province, Iran.

== Demographics ==
=== Population ===
At the time of the 2006 National Census, the village's population was 325 in 72 households. The following census in 2011 counted 310 people in 83 households. The 2016 census measured the population of the village as 341 people in 92 households.
