= Heshmatabad, Silakhor =

Heshmatabad حشمت اباد
- Village
- Location within Iran
- Coordinates: 33°41′05″N 48°57′14″E
- Country: Iran
- Province: Lorestan
- County: Dorud
- Bakhsh: Silakhor
- Rural District: Chalanchulan

Population (2006)
  - Total: 120
- Time zone: UTC+3:30 (IRST)
  - Summer (DST): UTC+4:30 (IRDT)

Heshmatabad (Persian: حشمت اباد, also Romanized as Ḩeshmatābād and Hashmatābād) is a village in Chalanchulan Rural District, Silakhor District, Dorud County, Lorestan Province, Iran. At the 2006 census, its population was 120, in 26 families.
