= Pirabad =

Village in Lorestan province, Iran

Pirabad Persian: پيرآباد
- Village
- Location within Iran
- Coordinates: 33°31′11″N 49°06′04″E
- Country: Iran
- Province: Lorestan
- County: Dorud
- District: Central
- Rural District: Zhan

Population (2016)
  - Total: 1,334
- Time zone: UTC+3:30 (IRST)

Pirabad (Persian: پيرآباد) (Note: Also romanized as Pīrābād) is a village in Zhan Rural District of the Central District in Dorud County, Lorestan province, Iran.

== Demographics ==
=== Population ===
At the time of the 2006 National Census, the village's population was 1,004 in 214 households. The following census in 2011 counted 1,267 people in 304 households. The 2016 census measured the population of the village as 1,334 people in 361 households.
