= Marvak =

Marvak (Persian: مروك) may refer to:

- Marvak, Lorestan
- Marvak, South Khorasan
