= Farmanabad =

Farmanabad (Persian: فرمان آباد) may refer to:

- Farmanabad, Lorestan
- Farmanabad, Razavi Khorasan
