= Zargaran-e Bala =

Village in Lorestan province, Iran

Zargaran-e Bala Persian: زرگران بالا
- Village
- Location within Iran
- Coordinates: 33°38′40″N 48°55′25″E
- Country: Iran
- Province: Lorestan
- County: Dorud
- District: Silakhor
- Rural District: Chalanchulan

Population (2016)
  - Total: 776
- Time zone: UTC+3:30 (IRST)

Zargaran-e Bala (Persian: زرگران بالا) (Note: Also romanized as Zargarān-e Bālā; formerly known as Zargaran-e Olya (زرگران عليا), also romanized as Zargarān-e ‘Olyā; also known as Zargīna, Zargina Buzurg, and Zargirān Buzurg) is a village in Chalanchulan Rural District of Silakhor District in Dorud County, Lorestan province, Iran.

== Demographics ==
=== Population ===
At the time of the 2006 National Census, the village's population, as Zargaran-e Olya, was 740 in 190 households. The following census in 2011 counted 761 people in 224 households, by which time the village was listed as Zargaran-e Bala. The 2016 census measured the population of the village as 776 people in 239 households, the most populous in its rural district.
