= Bahaabad =

Bahaabad (Persian: بهاآباد or بهااباد) may refer to:

- Bahaabad, Razavi Khorasan
- Bahaabad, Semnan
- Bahaabad, Kerman
