= Pashman =

Pashman is a surname. Notable people with the surname include:

- Dan Pashman (fl. 1999), American podcaster
- Morris Pashman (1912–1999), American judge

== See also ==
- Baba Pashman, a village in Lorestan, Iran
