= Zargaran-e Pain =

Village in Lorestan province, Iran

Zargaran-e Pain Persian: زرگران پايين
- Village
- Location within Iran
- Coordinates: 33°38′25″N 48°56′13″E
- Country: Iran
- Province: Lorestan
- County: Dorud
- District: Silakhor
- Rural District: Chalanchulan

Population (2016)
  - Total: 274
- Time zone: UTC+3:30 (IRST)

Zargaran-e Pain (Persian: زرگران پايين) (Note: Also romanized as Zargarān-e Pā’īn; formerly known as Zargaran-e Sofla (زرگران سفلي), also romanized as Zargarān-e Soflá) is a village in Chalanchulan Rural District of Silakhor District in Dorud County, Lorestan province, Iran.

== Demographics ==
=== Population ===
At the time of the 2006 National Census, the village's population, as Zargaran-e Sofla, was 249 in 58 households. The following census in 2011 counted 246 people in 69 households, by which time the village was listed as Zargaran-e Pain. The 2016 census measured the population of the village as 274 people in 77 households.
