= Bahramabad-e Bala =

Village in Lorestan province, Iran

Bahramabad-e Bala Persian: بهرام آبادبالا
- Village
- Location within Iran
- Coordinates: 33°33′26″N 49°05′38″E
- Country: Iran
- Province: Lorestan
- County: Dorud
- District: Central
- Rural District: Zhan

Population (2016)
  - Total: 982
- Time zone: UTC+3:30 (IRST)

Bahramabad-e Bala (Persian: بهرام آبادبالا) (Note: Also romanized as Bahrāmābād-e Bālā; formerly known as Bahramabad-e Olya (بهرام آباد عليا), also romanized as Bahrāmābād-e ‘Olyā) is a village in Zhan Rural District of the Central District in Dorud County, Lorestan province, Iran.

== Demographics ==
=== Population ===
At the time of the 2006 National Census, the village's population, as Bahramabad-e Olya, was 926 in 187 households. The following census in 2011 counted 1,088 people in 264 households, by which time the village was listed as Bahramabad-e Bala. The 2016 census measured the population of the village as 982 people in 270 households.
