= Daryab, Lorestan =

Village in Lorestan province, Iran

Daryab Persian: دارياب
- Village
- Location within Iran
- Coordinates: 33°32′09″N 48°59′22″E
- Country: Iran
- Province: Lorestan
- County: Dorud
- District: Central
- Rural District: Dorud

Population (2016)
  - Total: 2,361
- Time zone: UTC+3:30 (IRST)

Daryab (Persian: دارياب) (Note: Also romanized as Dār-i-Āb and Dāryāb) is a village in Dorud Rural District of the Central District in Dorud County, Lorestan province, Iran.

== Demographics ==
=== Population ===
At the time of the 2006 National Census, the village's population was 1,993 in 408 households. The following census in 2011 counted 2,300 people in 571 households. The 2016 census measured the population of the village as 2,361 people in 657 households.
