= Heshmatabad, Dorud =

Village in Lorestan province, Iran

Heshmatabad Persian: حشمت آباد
- Village
- Location within Iran
- Coordinates: 33°27′59″N 49°11′03″E
- Country: Iran
- Province: Lorestan
- County: Dorud
- District: Central
- Rural District: Heshmatabad

Population (2016)
  - Total: 710
- Time zone: UTC+3:30 (IRST)

Heshmatabad (Persian: حشمت آباد) (Note: Also romanized as Hashmatābād and Ḩeshmatābād) is a village in, and the capital of, Heshmatabad Rural District in the Central District of Dorud County, Lorestan province, Iran.

== Demographics ==
=== Population ===
At the time of the 2006 National Census, the village's population was 732 in 168 households. The following census in 2011 counted 662 people in 177 households. The 2016 census measured the population of the village as 710 people in 214 households.
