= Marvak, Lorestan =

Maruak مروك
- Village
- Location within Iran
- Coordinates: 33°39′59″N 49°03′23″E
- Country: Iran
- Province: Lorestan
- County: Dorud
- Bakhsh: Silakhor
- Rural District: Silakhor

Population (2006)
  - Total: 203
- Time zone: UTC+3:30 (IRST)
  - Summer (DST): UTC+4:30 (IRDT)

Maruak (Persian: مروك, also Romanized as Marūk and Morvak) is a village in Silakhor Rural District, Silakhor District, Dorud County, Lorestan Province, Iran. At the 2006 census, its population was 203, in 53 families.
