= Darmian, Lorestan =

Village in Lorestan province, Iran

Darmian Persian: درميان
- Village
- Location within Iran
- Coordinates: 33°30′37″N 49°07′06″E
- Country: Iran
- Province: Lorestan
- County: Dorud
- District: Central
- Rural District: Zhan

Population (2016)
  - Total: 548
- Time zone: UTC+3:30 (IRST)

Darmian (Persian: درميان) (Note: Also romanized as Darmeyān and Darmīān) is a village in Zhan Rural District of the Central District in Dorud County, Lorestan province, Iran.

== Demographics ==
=== Population ===
At the time of the 2006 National Census, the village's population was 505 in 95 households. The following census in 2011 counted 587 people in 120 households. The 2016 census measured the population of the village as 548 people in 138 households.
