= Bahramabad-e Pain =

Village in Lorestan province, Iran

Bahramabad-e Pain Persian: بهرام آباد پايين
- Village
- Location within Iran
- Coordinates: 33°33′21″N 49°04′55″E
- Country: Iran
- Province: Lorestan
- County: Dorud
- District: Central
- Rural District: Zhan

Population (2016)
  - Total: 312
- Time zone: UTC+3:30 (IRST)

Bahramabad-e Pain (Persian: بهرام آباد پايين) (Note: Also romanized as Bahrāmābād-e Pā’īn; formerly known as Bahramabad-e Sofla (بهرام آباد سفلي), also romanized as Bahrāmābād-e Soflá; also known as Bahrāmābād and Behrāmābād) is a village in Zhan Rural District of the Central District in Dorud County, Lorestan province, Iran.

== Demographics ==
=== Population ===
At the time of the 2006 National Census, the village's population, as Bahramabad-e Sofla, was 324 in 63 households. The following census in 2011 counted 254 people in 67 households, by which time the village was listed as Bahramabad-e Pain. The 2016 census measured the population of the village as 312 people in 88 households.
