= Araban, Dorud =

Village in Lorestan province, Iran

Araban Persian: عربان
- Village
- Location within Iran
- Coordinates: 33°44′09″N 48°51′24″E
- Country: Iran
- Province: Lorestan
- County: Dorud
- District: Silakhor
- Rural District: Chalanchulan

Population (2016)
  - Total: 456
- Time zone: UTC+3:30 (IRST)

Araban (Persian: عربان) (Note: Also romanized as ‘Arabān; also known as Arāvūn and Arāwun) is a village in Chalanchulan Rural District of Silakhor District in Dorud County, Lorestan province, Iran.

== Demographics ==
=== Population ===
At the time of the 2006 National Census, the village's population was 448 in 109 households. The following census in 2011 counted 426 people in 114 households. The 2016 census measured the population of the village as 456 people in 127 households.
