= Havila =

Havila may refer to:

- Havilan, a village in Iran
- Havila Shipping
- Havila Kystruten (both these two are owned by the same holding company)
