= Siah Kalleh, Lorestan =

Village in Lorestan province, Iran

Siah Kalleh Persian: سياه كله
- Village
- Location within Iran
- Coordinates: 33°31′45″N 49°00′35″E
- Country: Iran
- Province: Lorestan
- County: Dorud
- District: Central
- Rural District: Dorud

Population (2016)
  - Total: 4,034
- Time zone: UTC+3:30 (IRST)

Siah Kalleh (Persian: سياه كله) (Note: Also romanized as Seyāh Koleh, Sīāh Kaleh, Sīāh Kalleh, Sīāh Kolah, and Sīyāh Kaleh; also known as Siāh Qal‘eh) is a village in, and the capital of, Dorud Rural District in the Central District of Dorud County, Lorestan province, Iran.

== Demographics ==
=== Population ===
At the time of the 2006 National Census, the village's population was 2,781 in 564 households. The following census in 2011 counted 3,373 people in 867 households. The 2016 census measured the population of the village as 4,034 people in 1,079 households.
