= Torshab, Lorestan =

Village in Lorestan province, Iran

Torshab Persian: ترشاب
- Village
- Location within Iran
- Coordinates: 33°28′24″N 49°11′34″E
- Country: Iran
- Province: Lorestan
- County: Dorud
- District: Central
- Rural District: Heshmatabad

Population (2016)
  - Total: 1,161
- Time zone: UTC+3:30 (IRST)

Torshab (Persian: ترشاب) (Note: Also romanized as Torshāb; also known as Torshāb-e ‘Olyā) is a village in Heshmatabad Rural District of the Central District in Dorud County, Lorestan province, Iran.

== Demographics ==
=== Population ===
At the time of the 2006 National Census, the village's population was 1,038 in 232 households. The following census in 2011 counted 1,099 people in 276 households. The 2016 census measured the population of the village as 1,161 people in 320 households.
