= Yazdegerd =

Yazdegerd, Yazdgerd, Yazdigird, or Yazdagird (Inscriptional Middle Persian: 𐭩𐭦𐭣𐭪𐭥𐭲𐭩 <yzdkrty> or 𐭩𐭦𐭣𐭪𐭫𐭲𐭩 <yzdklty> Yazdgird, Yazdkirt; Persian: یزدگرد Yazdgerd; Arabic: یزدجرد Yazdijird) may refer to:

- Yazdegerd I (r. 399–420), Sasanian King of Persia
- Yazdegerd II (r. 438–457), Sasanian King, son of Bahram V
- Yazdegerd III (r. 632–651), last king of the Sasanian Empire
- Yazdagird (Bavandid ruler) (r. 1271–1300), ruler in Mazandaran
- Yazdgerd, Lorestan, a village in Lorestan Province, Iran

== See also ==
- Yazata, also sometimes spelled Yazad
