= Darmian =

Darmian may refer to:

== Places ==
- Darmian, Lorestan, a village in Lorestan province, Iran
- Darmian, South Khorasan, a village in South Khorasan province, Iran
- Darmian County, an administrative division of South Khorasan province, Iran
- Darmian Rural District, an administrative division of Damian County, South Khorasan province, Iran

== People ==
- Matteo Darmian (born 1989), Italian footballer

== Other uses ==
- Darmiyaan: In Between, 1997 Indian drama film by Kalpana Lajmi
