= Araban, Iran =

Araban (Persian: عربان) in Iran may refer to:

- Araban, Gilan
- Araban, Dorud, Lorestan Province
- Araban, Khorramabad, Lorestan Province
