= Dorud =

City in Lorestan province, Iran

Dorud Persian: دورود
- City
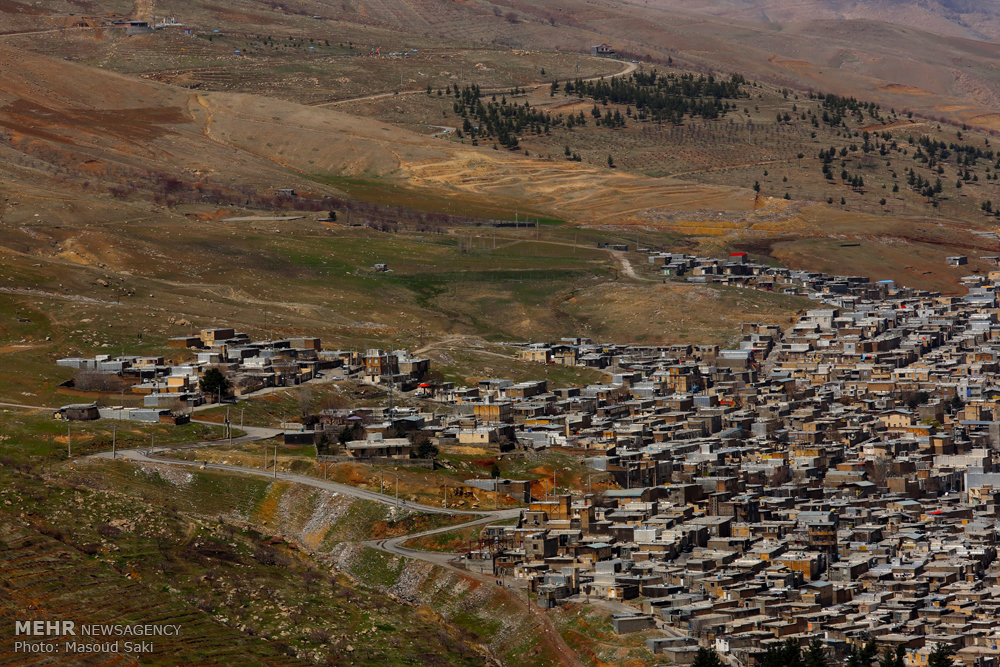
- Aerial view of the city of Dorud

- Location within Iran
- Coordinates: 33°29′58″N 49°03′11″E
- Country: Iran
- Province: Lorestan
- County: Dorud
- District: Central

Population (2016)
  - Total: 121,638
- Time zone: UTC+3:30 (IRST)

Dorud (Persian: دورود) (Note: Also romanized as Dorūd, Dow Rūd, and Dūrūd) is a city in the Central District of Dorud County, Lorestan province, Iran, serving as capital of both the county and the district.

== Demographics ==
=== Population ===
At the time of the 2006 National Census, the city's population was 100,528 in 23,596 households. The following census in 2011 counted 99,499 people in 26,883 households. The 2016 census measured the population of the city as 121,638 people in 35,529 households.

== Climate ==
Doroud's climate can be classified as mediterranean (Köppen:Csa, Trewartha: Cs) with dry and very hot summers that receive almost no rainfall. Precipitation mostly falls from November to April. Snow is possible in winter, and can sometimes be heavy. This was the case in January 2014, when snow height reached 25 cm (9.8 in) in the city and 50 cm (20 in) in the neighboring highlands.

Climate data for Dorud (2000–2005)
Month	Jan	Feb	Mar	Apr	May	Jun	Jul	Aug	Sep	Oct	Nov	Dec	Year
Mean daily maximum °C (°F)	6.9 (44.4)	9.9 (49.8)	15.9 (60.6)	20.5 (68.9)	26.1 (79.0)	33.1 (91.6)	36.6 (97.9)	36.6 (97.9)	32.3 (90.1)	25.3 (77.5)	15.4 (59.7)	9.7 (49.5)	22.4 (72.2)
Daily mean °C (°F)	2.6 (36.7)	5.1 (41.2)	10.3 (50.5)	14.9 (58.8)	19.3 (66.7)	25.0 (77.0)	28.7 (83.7)	28.5 (83.3)	24.0 (75.2)	18.8 (65.8)	10.4 (50.7)	5.7 (42.3)	16.1 (61.0)
Mean daily minimum °C (°F)	−1.7 (28.9)	0.2 (32.4)	4.8 (40.6)	9.4 (48.9)	12.5 (54.5)	17.0 (62.6)	20.9 (69.6)	20.5 (68.9)	15.7 (60.3)	12.2 (54.0)	5.3 (41.5)	1.6 (34.9)	9.9 (49.8)
Average precipitation mm (inches)	98.8 (3.89)	64.0 (2.52)	110.8 (4.36)	115.8 (4.56)	28.5 (1.12)	1.4 (0.06)	0.1 (0.00)	0.0 (0.0)	0.7 (0.03)	25.5 (1.00)	72.5 (2.85)	161.3 (6.35)	679.4 (26.74)
Average relative humidity (%)	63	53	42	44	32	20	18	17	18	29	53	62	38
Source: IRIMO (temperatures), (precipitation), (humidity)

== Protests in 2017 ==
At least five people were killed in Dorud on 30 December during the 2017 Iranian protests. The New York Times reported two people killed in Dorud on 20 December during 2017 Iranian protests. In an interview on state television, the Deputy Governor of Lorestan province blamed demonstration violence on "enemies of the revolution, Takfiri groups and foreign agents...No shots were fired by the police and security forces."
