= Chalanchulan =

City in Lorestan province, Iran

Chalanchulan Persian: چالانچولان
- City
- Location within Iran
- Coordinates: 33°39′54″N 48°54′24″E
- Country: Iran
- Province: Lorestan
- County: Dorud
- District: Silakhor
- Established as a city: 1998

Population (2016)
  - Total: 2,223
- Time zone: UTC+3:30 (IRST)

Chalanchulan (Persian: چالانچولان) (Note: Also romanized as Chālān Chūlān and Chālānchūlān) is a city in, and the capital of, Silakhor District in Dorud County, Lorestan province, Iran. It also serves as the administrative center for Chalanchulan Rural District. The village of Chalanchulan was converted to a city in 1998.

== Demographics ==
=== Population ===
At the time of the 2006 National Census, the city's population was 1,094 in 277 households. The following census in 2011 counted 1,478 people in 390 households. The 2016 census measured the population of the city as 2,223 people in 609 households.
