= Torshab Lake =

Lake in Iran

Torshab lake
- Location within Iran
- Interactive map of Torshab lake
- Coordinates: 29°52′09″N 56°29′50″E
- Type: lake
- Primary inflows: rain
- Primary outflows: none
- Max. depth: 50 cm (20 in)
- Settlements: Torshab, Kerman province, Iran

Torshab (Persian: دریاچه‌ ترشاب), also known as Tershab, is one of the salt lakes in the Kerman province of southeast Iran. It is a seasonal lake 13 kilometers south of Bardsir County, near the town of Torshab.

== Geography and climate ==
The lake is located in arid surroundings. It is characterized by fluctuating water levels due to rainfall and evaporation patterns.

== Hydrology ==
Seasonal watercourses replenish the lake, which boasts a mineral-rich saline environment.

== Ecological significance ==
Lake's environment varied aquatic ecosystems and provides a habitat for numerous bird species. The most common birds in the area surrounding this lake are mallards, white egrets, and gray herons. In this area, they primarily seek cover throughout the winter. Other animals present include wolves, foxes, and various mammals.
