= Bizlan =

- Municipality
- Location within Azerbaijan
- Coordinates: 40°43′28″N 48°23′35″E
- Country: Azerbaijan
- Rayon: Ismailli

Population
  - Total: 480
- Time zone: UTC+4 (AZT)
  - Summer (DST): UTC+5 (AZT)

Bizlan (also, Biznan) is a village and municipality in the Ismailli Rayon of Azerbaijan. It has a population of 480. The municipality consists of the villages of Bizlan and Zərgəran.
