= Siah Koleh, Gilan =

SiahKoleh سياهكُله
- Village
- Location within Iran
- Coordinates: 37°01′20″N 50°23′48″E
- Country: Iran
- Province: Gilan
- County: Rudsar
- Bakhsh: Kelachay
- Rural District: Bibalan

Population (2006)
  - Total: 145
- Time zone: UTC+3:30 (IRST)
  - Summer (DST): UTC+4:30 (IRDT)

Siah Koleh (Persian: سياهكُله, also Romanized as Sīāh Koleh) is a village in Bibalan Rural District, Kelachay District, Rudsar County, Gilan Province, Iran. At the 2006 census, its population was 145, in 39 families.
