= Sarangi, Iran =

Sarangi سرنگي
- Village
- Location within Iran
- Coordinates: 30°38′36″N 57°07′45″E
- Country: Iran
- Province: Kerman
- County: Ravar
- Bakhsh: Kuhsaran
- Rural District: Horjand

Population (2006)
  - Total: 38
- Time zone: UTC+3:30 (IRST)
  - Summer (DST): UTC+4:30 (IRDT)

Sarangi (Persian: سرنگي, also Romanized as Sarangī; also known as Sarangar, Sarangū, Sarānjeh, and Sarengīl) is a village in Horjand Rural District, Kuhsaran District, Ravar County, Kerman Province, Iran. At the 2006 census, its population was 38, in 10 families.
