= Andikayi =

Andikayi انديكايي
- Village
- Location within Iran
- Coordinates: 32°09′41″N 49°31′22″E
- Country: Iran
- Province: Khuzestan
- County: Andika
- Bakhsh: Abezhdan
- Rural District: Abezhdan

Population (2006)
  - Total: 92
- Time zone: UTC+3:30 (IRST)
  - Summer (DST): UTC+4:30 (IRDT)

Andikayi (Persian: انديكايي, also Romanized as Āndīḵāyī; also known as Āndīkāee) is a village in Abezhdan Rural District, Abezhdan District, Andika County, Khuzestan Province, Iran. At the 2006 census, its population was 92, in 19 families.
