= Soranjeh, Selseleh =

Soranjeh سرنجه
- Village
- Location within Iran
- Coordinates: 33°45′31″N 48°10′37″E
- Country: Iran
- Province: Lorestan
- County: Selseleh
- Bakhsh: Central
- Rural District: Doab

Population (2006)
  - Total: 64
- Time zone: UTC+3:30 (IRST)
  - Summer (DST): UTC+4:30 (IRDT)

Soranjeh (Persian: سرنجه, also Romanized as Sarenjeh, Serenjeh, and Sorenjeh; also known as Serenjeh-ye Do Āb and Serenjeh-ye Doāb) is a village in Doab Rural District, in the Central District of Selseleh County, Lorestan Province, Iran. At the 2006 census, its population was 64, in 12 families.
