= Saranjeh-e Qolayi =

Saranjeh-e Qolayi سرنجه قلايي
- Village
- Location within Iran
- Coordinates: 33°46′49″N 47°57′50″E
- Country: Iran
- Province: Lorestan
- County: Selseleh
- Bakhsh: Firuzabad
- Rural District: Qalayi

Population (2006)
  - Total: 161
- Time zone: UTC+3:30 (IRST)
  - Summer (DST): UTC+4:30 (IRDT)

Saranjeh-e Qolayi (Persian: سرنجه قلايي, also Romanized as Saranjeh-e Qolāyī; also known as Saranjeh, Sarenjeh, and Sarīnjeh) is a village in Qalayi Rural District, Firuzabad District, Selseleh County, Lorestan Province, Iran. At the 2006 census, its population was 161, in 34 families.
