= Bahramabad, Kermanshah =

Bahramabad بهرام آباد، بارام ئاوا
- Village
- Location within Iran
- Coordinates: 34°41′20″N 47°01′58″E
- Country: Iran
- Province: Kermanshah
- County: Kermanshah
- Bakhsh: Central
- Rural District: Razavar

Population (2006)
  - Total: 307
- Time zone: UTC+3:30 (IRST)
  - Summer (DST): UTC+4:30 (IRDT)

Bahramabad (Persian: بهرام آباد, Southern Kurdish: بارام ئاوا, also Romanized as Bahrāmābād) is a village in Razavar Rural District, in the Central District of Kermanshah County, Kermanshah Province, Iran. At the 2006 census, its population was 307, in 73 families.
