= Zir Tang-e Khayyat =

Zir Tang-e Khayyat زير تنگ خياط
- Village
- Location within Iran
- Coordinates: 33°55′00″N 48°03′00″E
- Country: Iran
- Province: Lorestan
- County: Selseleh
- Bakhsh: Firuzabad
- Rural District: Firuzabad

Population (2006)
  - Total: 245
- Time zone: UTC+3:30 (IRST)
  - Summer (DST): UTC+4:30 (IRDT)

Zir Tang-e Khayyat (Persian: زير تنگ خياط, also Romanized as Zīr Tang-e Khayyāṭ; also known as Zīr Tang) is a village in Firuzabad Rural District, Firuzabad District, Selseleh County, Lorestan Province, Iran. At the 2006 census, its population was 245, in 47 families.
