= Bahramabad, Abezhdan =

Village in Khuzestan, Iran

Bahramabad بهرام اباد
- Village
- Location within Iran
- Coordinates: 32°13′31″N 49°31′22″E
- Country: Iran
- Province: Khuzestan
- County: Andika
- Bakhsh: Abezhdan
- Rural District: Kushk

Population (2006)
  - Total: 62
- Time zone: UTC+3:30 (IRST)
  - Summer (DST): UTC+4:30 (IRDT)

Bahramabad (Persian: بهرام اباد, also Romanized as Bahrāmābād) is a village in Kushk Rural District, Abezhdan District, Andika County, Khuzestan Province, Iran. At the 2006 census, its population was 62, in 11 families.
