= Dowlatabad, Rafsanjan =

Dowlatabad دولت آباد
- Village
- Location within Iran
- Coordinates: 30°24′47″N 55°51′24″E
- Country: Iran
- Province: Kerman
- County: Rafsanjan
- Bakhsh: Central
- Rural District: Eslamiyeh

Population (2006)
  - Total: 377
- Time zone: UTC+3:30 (IRST)
  - Summer (DST): UTC+4:30 (IRDT)

Dowlatabad (Persian: دولت آباد, also Romanized as Dowlatābād; also known as Bahrāmābād and Dowlatābād-e Harandī) is a village in Eslamiyeh Rural District, in the Central District of Rafsanjan County, Kerman Province, Iran. At the 2006 census, its population was 377, in 83 families.
