= Bahramabad, Golestan =

Bahramabad بهرا م آباد
- Village
- Location within Iran
- Coordinates: 37°18′04″N 55°08′13″E
- Country: Iran
- Province: Golestan
- County: Gonbad-e Qabus
- Bakhsh: Central
- Rural District: Soltanali

Population (2006)
  - Total: 195
- Time zone: UTC+3:30 (IRST)
  - Summer (DST): UTC+4:30 (IRDT)

Bahramabad (Persian: بهرا م آباد, also Romanized as Bahrāmābād) is a village in Soltanali Rural District, in the Central District of Gonbad-e Qabus County, Golestan Province, Iran. At the 2006 census, its population was 195, in 50 families.
