= Baharabad, Mazandaran =

Baharabad بهارآباد
- Village
- Interactive map of Baharabad
- Coordinates: 36°42′03″N 53°06′34″E
- Country: Iran
- Province: Mazandaran
- County: Sari
- Bakhsh: Rudpey
- Rural District: Rudpey-ye Sharqi

Population (2016)
  - Total: 242
- Time zone: UTC+3:30 (IRST)

Baharabad (Persian: بهارآباد, also Romanized as Bahārābād) is a village in Rudpey-ye Sharqi Rural District, in the Rudpey District of Sari County, Mazandaran Province, Iran. At the 2016 census, its population was 242, in 73 families. Increased from 149 people in 2006.
