= Zargaran, Marvdasht =

Zargaran زرگران
- Village
- Location within Iran
- Coordinates: 30°01′58″N 52°37′49″E
- Country: Iran
- Province: Fars
- County: Marvdasht
- Bakhsh: Central
- Rural District: Ramjerd-e Yek

Population (2006)
  - Total: 1,747
- Time zone: UTC+3:30 (IRST)
  - Summer (DST): UTC+4:30 (IRDT)

Zargaran (Persian: زرگران, also Romanized as Zargarān) is a village in Ramjerd-e Yek Rural District, in the Central District of Marvdasht County, Fars province, Iran. At the 2006 census, its population was 1,747, in 379 families.
