= Baba Khani, Selseleh =

Baba Khani باباخاني
- Village
- Location within Iran
- Coordinates: 33°49′40″N 48°13′31″E
- Country: Iran
- Province: Lorestan Province
- County: Selseleh
- Bakhsh: Central
- Rural District: Doab

Population (2006)
  - Total: 69
- Time zone: UTC+3:30 (IRST)
  - Summer (DST): UTC+4:30 (IRDT)

Baba Khani (Persian: باباخاني, also Romanized as Bābā Khānī) is a village in Doab Rural District, in the Central District of Selseleh County, Lorestan Province, Iran. At the 2006 census, its population was 69, in 12 families.
