= Bahramabad, East Azerbaijan =

Bahramabad بهرام اباد
- Village
- Location within Iran
- Coordinates: 37°53′41″N 45°33′58″E
- Country: Iran
- Province: East Azerbaijan
- County: Osku
- Bakhsh: Ilkhchi
- Rural District: Jazireh

Population (2006)
  - Total: 75
- Time zone: UTC+3:30 (IRST)
  - Summer (DST): UTC+4:30 (IRDT)

Bahramabad (Persian: بهرام اباد, also Romanized as Bahrāmābād) is an Iranian village on Shahi Island. It is located in Jazireh Rural District, Ilkhchi District, Osku County, East Azerbaijan Province, Iran. At the 2006 census, its population was 75, in 21 families.
