= Bahramabad, Kurdistan =

Bahramabad بارام ئاوا
- Village
- Location within Iran
- Coordinates: 35°21′32″N 46°15′23″E
- Country: Iran
- Province: Kurdistan
- County: Sarvabad
- Bakhsh: Central
- Rural District: Kusalan

Government

Population (2020)
  - Total: 836
- Time zone: UTC+3:30 (IRST)
  - Summer (DST): UTC+4:30 (IRDT)

Bahramabad (Persian: بهرام آباد, also Romanized as Bahrāmābād and Behrāmābād) is a village in Kusalan Rural District, in the Central District of Sarvabad County, Kurdistan Province, Iran. At the 2006 census, its population was 664, in 152 families. The village is populated by Kurds.
