= Garazh, Khorramabad =

Garazh گاراژ
- Village
- Location within Iran
- Coordinates: 33°17′56″N 48°27′19″E
- Country: Iran
- Province: Lorestan
- County: Khorramabad
- Bakhsh: Central
- Rural District: Kakasharaf

Population (2006)
  - Total: 18
- Time zone: UTC+3:30 (IRST)
  - Summer (DST): UTC+4:30 (IRDT)

Garazh (Persian: گاراژ, also Romanized as Gārāzh) is a village in Kakasharaf Rural District, in the Central District of Khorramabad County, Lorestan Province, Iran. At the 2006 census, its population was 18, in 4 families.
