= Bahram Gonbad =

Bahram Gonbad بهرام گنبد
- Village
- Location within Iran
- Coordinates: 36°04′25″N 47°39′49″E
- Country: Iran
- Province: Kurdistan
- County: Bijar
- Bakhsh: Central
- Rural District: Seylatan

Population (2006)
  - Total: 108
- Time zone: UTC+3:30 (IRST)
  - Summer (DST): UTC+4:30 (IRDT)

Bahram Gonbad (Persian: بهرام گنبد, also Romanized as Bahrām Gonbad; also known as Bahrām Ābād) is a village in Seylatan Rural District, in the Central District of Bijar County, Kurdistan province, Iran. At the 2006 census, its population was 108, in 29 families. The village is populated by Azerbaijanis with a Kurdish minority.
