= Bahramabad, Andika =

Bahramabad بهرام اباد
- Village
- Location within Iran
- Coordinates: 32°06′12″N 49°13′54″E
- Country: Iran
- Province: Khuzestan
- County: Andika
- Bakhsh: Central
- Rural District: Qaleh-ye Khvajeh

Population (2006)
  - Total: 58
- Time zone: UTC+3:30 (IRST)
  - Summer (DST): UTC+4:30 (IRDT)

Bahramabad (Persian: بهرام اباد, also Romanized as Bahrāmābād) is a village in Qaleh-ye Khvajeh Rural District, in the Central District of Andika County, Khuzestan Province, Iran. At the 2006 census, its population was 58, in 8 families.
