= Bahramabad, Kazerun =

Bahramabad بهرام اباد
- Village
- Location within Iran
- Coordinates: 29°43′56″N 51°35′13″E
- Country: Iran
- Province: Fars
- County: Kazerun
- Bakhsh: Central
- Rural District: Deris

Population (2006)
  - Total: 572
- Time zone: UTC+3:30 (IRST)
  - Summer (DST): UTC+4:30 (IRDT)

Bahramabad (Persian: بهرام اباد, also Romanized as Bahrāmābād) is a village in Deris Rural District, in the Central District of Kazerun County, Fars province, Iran. At the 2006 census, its population was 572, in 125 families.
