= Heshmatabad, Zaveh =

Heshmatabad حشمت اباد
- Village
- Location within Iran
- Coordinates: 35°17′57″N 59°37′19″E
- Country: Iran
- Province: Razavi Khorasan
- County: Zaveh
- Bakhsh: Central
- Rural District: Safaiyeh

Population (2006)
  - Total: 394
- Time zone: UTC+3:30 (IRST)
  - Summer (DST): UTC+4:30 (IRDT)

Heshmatabad (Persian: حشمت اباد, also Romanized as Ḩeshmatābād) is a village in Safaiyeh Rural District, in the Central District of Zaveh County, Razavi Khorasan Province, Iran. At the 2006 census, its population was 394, in 94 families.
