= Baharabad, Azerbaijan =

Coordinates: 39°53′N 47°31′E

Baharabad is a village and municipality in the Beylagan Rayon of Azerbaijan. It has a population of 741.
