= Zərgəran =

- Location within Azerbaijan
- Coordinates: 40°44′16″N 48°19′45″E
- Country: Azerbaijan
- Rayon: Ismailli
- Municipality: Bizlan
- Time zone: UTC+4 (AZT)
  - Summer (DST): UTC+5 (AZT)

Zərgəran (also, Zargeran) is a village in the Ismailli Rayon of Azerbaijan. The village forms part of the municipality of Bizlan.
