= Bahramabad, Anbarabad =

Bahramabad بهرام اباد
- Village
- Location within Iran
- Coordinates: 28°18′59″N 57°36′52″E
- Country: Iran
- Province: Kerman
- County: Anbarabad
- Bakhsh: Esmaili
- Rural District: Ganjabad

Population (2006)
  - Total: 393
- Time zone: UTC+3:30 (IRST)
  - Summer (DST): UTC+4:30 (IRDT)

Bahramabad (Persian: بهرام اباد, also Romanized as Bahrāmābād) is a village in Ganjabad Rural District, Esmaili District, Anbarabad County, Kerman Province, Iran. As of the 2006 census, its population was 393 with there being 88 families.
