= Daryab, Hamadan =

Daryab دارياب
- Village
- Location within Iran
- Coordinates: 34°18′32″N 48°02′28″E
- Country: Iran
- Province: Hamadan
- County: Nahavand
- Bakhsh: Khezel
- Rural District: Khezel-e Sharqi

Population (2006)
  - Total: 164
- Time zone: UTC+3:30 (IRST)
  - Summer (DST): UTC+4:30 (IRDT)

Daryab (Persian: دارياب, also Romanized as Dāryāb) is a village in Khezel-e Sharqi Rural District, Khezel District, Nahavand County, Hamadan Province, Iran. At the 2006 census, its population was 164, in 35 families.
