= Baharabad, West Azerbaijan =

Baharabad بهاراباد
- Village
- Location within Iran
- Coordinates: 37°59′49″N 44°37′39″E
- Country: Iran
- Province: West Azerbaijan
- County: Salmas
- Bakhsh: Kuhsar
- Rural District: Chahriq

Population (2006)
  - Total: 80
- Time zone: UTC+3:30 (IRST)
  - Summer (DST): UTC+4:30 (IRDT)

Baharabad (Persian: بهاراباد, also Romanized as Bahārābād) is a village in Chahriq Rural District, Kuhsar District, Salmas County, West Azerbaijan Province, Iran. At the 2006 census, its population was 80, in 15 families.
