= Bahaabad, Semnan =

Bahaabad بهاآباد
- Village
- Location within Iran
- Coordinates: 36°04′30″N 54°23′27″E
- Country: Iran
- Province: Semnan
- County: Damghan
- Bakhsh: Central
- Rural District: Howmeh

Population (2006)
  - Total: 41
- Time zone: UTC+3:30 (IRST)
  - Summer (DST): UTC+4:30 (IRDT)

Bahaabad (Persian: بهاآباد, also Romanized as Bahāābād; also known as Bahārābād) is a village in Howmeh Rural District, in the Central District of Damghan County, Semnan Province, Iran. At the 2006 census, its population was 41, in 11 families.
