= Torshab-e Bala =

Torshab-e Bala ترشاب بالا
- Village
- Location within Iran
- Coordinates: 29°49′09″N 56°33′50″E
- Country: Iran
- Province: Kerman
- County: Bardsir
- Bakhsh: Central
- Rural District: Mashiz

Population (2006)
  - Total: 10
- Time zone: UTC+3:30 (IRST)
  - Summer (DST): UTC+4:30 (IRDT)

Torshab-e Bala (Persian: ترشاب بالا, also Romanized as Torshāb-e Bālā; also known as Torshābād-e Bālā, Torshāb Torc-ab, and Turshāb Bāla) is a village in Mashiz Rural District, in the Central District of Bardsir County, Kerman Province, Iran. At the 2006 census, its population was 10, in 9 families.
