= Silabkhor-e Pain =

Silabkhvor-e Pain سيلابخورپائين
- Village
- Location within Iran
- Coordinates: 30°51′44″N 56°54′00″E
- Country: Iran
- Province: Kerman
- County: Zarand
- Bakhsh: Central
- Rural District: Hotkan

Population (2006)
  - Total: 49
- Time zone: UTC+3:30 (IRST)
  - Summer (DST): UTC+4:30 (IRDT)

Silabkhvor-e Pain (Persian: سيلابخورپائين) (Note: also romanized as Sīlābkhvor-e Pā’īn; also known as Seilabkhor Sofla, Seylābkhvor-e Soflá, Sīlākhor-e Soflá, and Sīlākhor Soflá) is a village in Hotkan Rural District, in the Central District of Zarand County, Kerman Province, Iran. At the 2006 census, its population was 49, in 12 families.
