= Silabkhor-e Bala =

Silabkhvor-e Bala سيلابخوربالا
- Village
- Location within Iran
- Coordinates: 30°51′30″N 56°53′50″E
- Country: Iran
- Province: Kerman
- County: Zarand
- Bakhsh: Central
- Rural District: Hotkan

Population (2006)
  - Total: 93
- Time zone: UTC+3:30 (IRST)
  - Summer (DST): UTC+4:30 (IRDT)

Silabkhvor-e Bala (Persian: سيلابخوربالا, also Romanized as Sīlābkhvor-e Bālā; also known as Seilabkhor Olya, Seylābkhvor-e ‘Olyā, Sīlābkhor, and Sīlākhor-e ‘Olyā) is a village in Hotkan Rural District, in the Central District of Zarand County, Kerman Province, Iran. At the 2006 census, its population was 93, in 22 families.
