= Beyramabad, Mashhad =

Beyramabad بيرم اباد
- Village
- Location within Iran
- Coordinates: 35°56′48″N 59°27′26″E
- Country: Iran
- Province: Razavi Khorasan
- County: Mashhad
- Bakhsh: Ahmadabad
- Rural District: Piveh Zhan

Population (2006)
  - Total: 17
- Time zone: UTC+3:30 (IRST)
  - Summer (DST): UTC+4:30 (IRDT)

Beyramabad (Persian: بيرم اباد, also Romanized as Beyrāmābād; also known as Bahrāmābād) is a village in Piveh Zhan Rural District, Ahmadabad District, Mashhad County, Razavi Khorasan Province, Iran. At the 2006 census, its population was 17, in 5 families.

== See also ==
- List of cities, towns and villages in Razavi Khorasan Province
