= Silakhor Rural District =

Rural district in Lorestan province, Iran

Silakhor Rural District Persian: دهستان سیلاخور
- Rural District
- Location within Iran
- Coordinates: 33°38′N 49°01′E
- Country: Iran
- Province: Lorestan
- County: Dorud
- District: Silakhor
- Established: 1987
- Capital: Kagheh

Population (2016)
  - Total: 5,160
- Time zone: UTC+3:30 (IRST)

Silakhor Rural District (Persian: دهستان سیلاخور) is in Silakhor District of Dorud County, Lorestan province, Iran. Its capital is the village of Kagheh.

== Demographics ==
=== Population ===
At the time of the 2006 National Census, the rural district's population was 5,514 in 1,347 households. There were 5,494 inhabitants in 1,521 households at the following census of 2011. The 2016 census measured the population of the rural district as 5,160 in 1,535 households. The most populous of its 21 villages was Kagheh, with 953 people.

=== Other villages in the rural district ===
- Alamabad
- Azizabad
- Azna
- Kalanganeh
- Laban-e Bala
- Laban-e Pain
- Push Kashan
