= Chalanchulan Rural District =

Rural district in Lorestan province, Iran

Chalanchulan Rural District Persian: دهستان چالانچولان
- Rural District
- Location within Iran
- Coordinates: 33°40′N 48°54′E
- Country: Iran
- Province: Lorestan
- County: Dorud
- District: Silakhor
- Capital: Chalanchulan

Population (2016)
  - Total: 7,470
- Time zone: UTC+3:30 (IRST)

Chalanchulan Rural District (Persian: دهستان چالانچولان) is in Silakhor District of Dorud County, Lorestan province, Iran. It is administered from the city of Chalanchulan.

== Demographics ==
=== Population ===
At the time of the 2006 National Census, the rural district's population was 8,288 in 2,055 households. There were 7,728 inhabitants in 2,143 households at the following census of 2011. The 2016 census measured the population of the rural district as 7,470 in 2,233 households. The most populous of its 25 villages was Zargaran-e Olya, with 776 people.

=== Other villages in the rural district ===
- Araban
- Beyatan
- Deh-e Hajji
- Hajjiabad-e Yarahmadi
- Karkhaneh Sefid Kan
- Pahlavan Kal
- Zargaran-e Pain
