= Heshmatabad Rural District =

Rural district in Lorestan province, Iran

Heshmatabad Rural District Persian: دهستان حشمت آباد
- Rural District
- Location within Iran
- Coordinates: 33°26′N 49°10′E
- Country: Iran
- Province: Lorestan
- County: Dorud
- District: Central
- Established: 1987
- Capital: Heshmatabad

Population (2016)
  - Total: 8,933
- Time zone: UTC+3:30 (IRST)

Heshmatabad Rural District (Persian: دهستان حشمت آباد) is in the Central District of Dorud County, Lorestan province, Iran. Its capital is the village of Heshmatabad.

== Demographics ==
=== Population ===
At the time of the 2006 National Census, the rural district's population was 9,738 in 2,291 households. There were 8,874 inhabitants in 2,279 households at the following census of 2011. The 2016 census measured the population of the rural district as 8,933 in 2,341 households. The most populous of its 23 villages was Defense Industries Houses, with 1,308 people.

=== Other villages in the rural district ===
- Bonakabad
- Chamnar
- Choghadun
- Gav Koshteh
- Razvar
- Torshab
