= Dorud Rural District =

Rural district in Lorestan province, Iran

Dorud Rural District Persian: دهستان دورود
- Rural District
- Location within Iran
- Coordinates: 33°26′N 49°01′E
- Country: Iran
- Province: Lorestan
- County: Dorud
- District: Central
- Established: 1987
- Capital: Siah Kalleh

Population (2016)
  - Total: 16,712
- Time zone: UTC+3:30 (IRST)

Dorud Rural District (Persian: دهستان دورود) is in the Central District of Dorud County, Lorestan province, Iran. Its capital is the village of Siah Kalleh.

== Demographics ==
=== Population ===
At the time of the 2006 National Census, the rural district's population was 13,689 in 2,834 households. There were 17,251 inhabitants in 4,008 households at the following census of 2011. The 2016 census measured the population of the rural district as 16,712 in 4,595 households. The most populous of its 32 villages was Choqabdar, with 4,441 people.

=== Other villages in the rural district ===
- Amirabad (northern)
- Daryab
- Emarat
- Gusheh-ye Pol
- Khosrowabad
- Sandarkan
