= Zhan Rural District =

Rural district in Lorestan province, Iran

Zhan Rural District Persian: دهستان ژان
- Rural District
- Location within Iran
- Coordinates: 33°37′N 49°10′E
- Country: Iran
- Province: Lorestan
- County: Dorud
- District: Central
- Established: 1987
- Capital: Zhan

Population (2016)
  - Total: 12,372
- Time zone: UTC+3:30 (IRST)

Zhan Rural District (Persian: دهستان ژان) is in the Central District of Dorud County, Lorestan province, Iran. Its capital is the village of Zhan.

== Demographics ==
=== Population ===
At the time of the 2006 National Census, the rural district's population was 20,175 in 4,287 households. There were 22,476 inhabitants in 5,595 households at the following census of 2011. The 2016 census measured the population of the rural district as 12,372 in 3,298 households. The most populous of its 14 villages was Deh Now, with 2,649 people.

=== Other villages in the rural district ===
- Bahramabad-e Bala
- Bahramabad-e Pain
- Darmian
- Gol-e Gurchak
- Pirabad
- Suran
- Tanur Dar
