= Silakhor District =

District in Lorestan province, Iran

Silakhor District Persian: بخش سیلاخور
- District
- Location within Iran
- Coordinates: 33°39′N 48°58′E
- Country: Iran
- Province: Lorestan
- County: Dorud
- Established: 1989
- Capital: Chalanchulan

Population (2016)
  - Total: 14,853
- Time zone: UTC+3:30 (IRST)

Silakhor District (Persian: بخش سیلاخور) is in Dorud County, Lorestan province, Iran. Its capital is the city of Chalanchulan.

== Demographics ==
=== Population ===
At the time of the 2006 National Census, the district's population was 14,896 in 3,679 households. The following census in 2011 counted 14,700 people in 4,054 households. The 2016 census measured the population of the district as 14,853 inhabitants in 4,377 households.

=== Administrative divisions ===
Silakhor District Population
Administrative Divisions	2006	2011	2016
Chalanchulan RD	8,288	7,728	7,470
Silakhor RD	5,514	5,494	5,160
Chalanchulan (city)	1,094	1,478	2,223
Total	14,896	14,700	14,853
RD = Rural District
