= Central District (Dorud County) =

District in Lorestan province, Iran

Central District (Dorud County) Persian: بخش مرکزی شهرستان دورود
- District
- Location within Iran
- Coordinates: 33°30′N 49°06′E
- Country: Iran
- Province: Lorestan
- County: Dorud
- Established: 1989
- Capital: Dorud

Population (2016)
  - Total: 159,655
- Time zone: UTC+3:30 (IRST)

The Central District of Dorud County (Persian: بخش مرکزی شهرستان دورود) is in Lorestan province, Iran. Its capital is the city of Dorud.

== Demographics ==
=== Population ===
At the time of the 2006 National Census, the district's population was 144,130 in 33,008 households. The following census in 2011 counted 148,100 people in 38,765 households. The 2016 census measured the population of the district as 159,655 inhabitants in 45,763 households.

=== Administrative divisions ===
Central District (Dorud County) Population
Administrative Divisions	2006	2011	2016
Dorud RD	13,689	17,251	16,712
Heshmatabad RD	9,738	8,874	8,933
Zhan RD	20,175	22,476	12,372
Dorud (city)	100,528	99,499	121,638
Total	144,130	148,100	159,655
RD = Rural District
