= Dorud County =

County in Lorestan province, Iran

Dorud County Persian: شهرستان دورود
- County
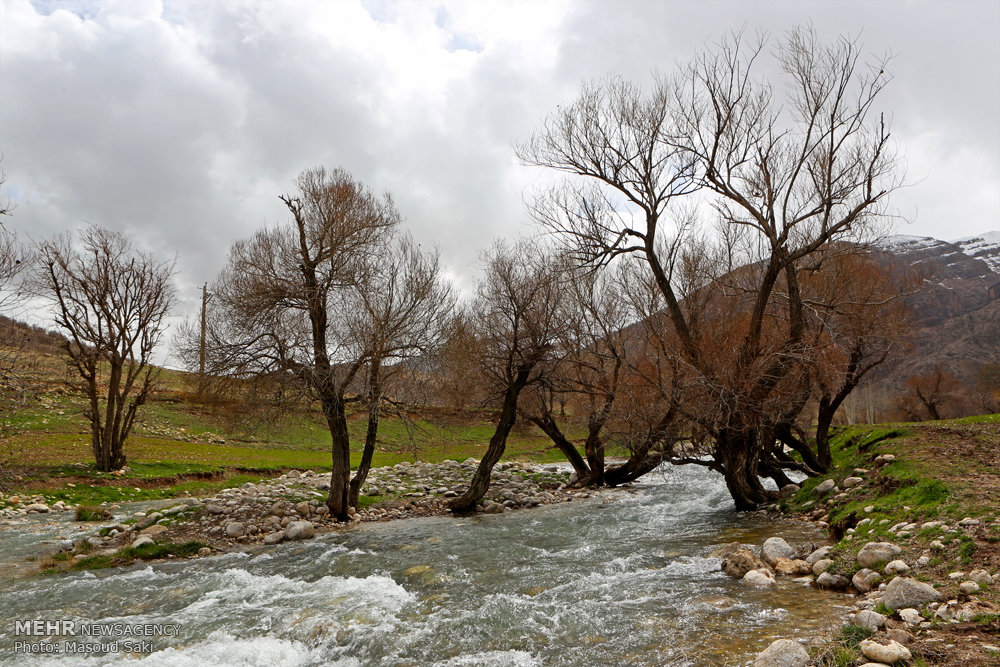
- Landscape in Dorud County

- Location of Dorud County in Lorestan province (right, yellow)

- Location of Lorestan province in Iran
- Coordinates: 33°31′N 49°05′E
- Country: Iran
- Province: Lorestan
- Established: 1989
- Capital: Dorud
- Districts: Central, Silakhor

Population (2016)
  - Total: 174,508
- Time zone: UTC+3:30 (IRST)

Dorud County (Persian: شهرستان دورود) is in Lorestan province, Iran. Its capital is the city of Dorud.

== Demographics ==
=== Population ===
At the time of the 2006 National Census, the county's population was 159,026 in 36,687 households. The following census in 2011 counted 162,800 people in 42,815 households. The 2016 census measured the population of the county as 174,508 in 50,140 households.

=== Administrative divisions ===
Dorud County's population history and administrative structure over three consecutive censuses are shown in the following table

Dorud County population
Administrative divisions	2006	2011	2016
Central District	144,130	148,100	159,655
Dorud RD	13,689	17,251	16,712
Heshmatabad RD	9,738	8,874	8,933
Zhan RD	20,175	22,476	12,372
Dorud (city)	100,528	99,499	121,638
Silakhor District	14,896	14,700	14,853
Chalanchulan RD	8,288	7,728	7,470
Silakhor RD	5,514	5,494	5,160
Chalanchulan (city)	1,094	1,478	2,223
Total	159,026	162,800	174,508
RD = Rural District

== See also ==
Media related to Dorud County at Wikimedia Commons
