= Jahadabad =

Jahadabad or Jehadabad (Persian: جهادآباد) may refer to:

- Jahadabad, Ardabil
- Jahadabad, Firuzabad, Fars Province
- Jahadabad, Larestan, Fars Province
- Jahadabad, Rostam, Fars Province
- Jahadabad, Golestan
- Jahadabad, Hamadan
- Jahadabad, Ilam
- Jahadabad, Isfahan
- Jahadabad, Kerman
- Jahadabad, Jiroft, Kerman Province
- Jahadabad, Manujan, Kerman Province
- Jehadabad, Qaleh Ganj, Kerman Province
- Jahadabad, Khuzestan
- Jahadabad, Boyer-Ahmad, Kohgiluyeh and Boyer-Ahmad Province
- Jahadabad-e Cheshmeh Tagi, Boyer-Ahmad County, Kohgiluyeh and Boyer-Ahmad Province
- Jahadabad, Gachsaran, Kohgiluyeh and Boyer-Ahmad Province
- Jahadabad, Lorestan
- Jahadabad Rural District, in Kerman Province
