= Nesah =

Nesah (Persian: نسه) may refer to:

- Nesah Kuh (disambiguation)
- Nesah Kuh Ali Chin
- Nesah Kuh Veysi Chin
- Nesah-ye Allahdad
- Nesah-ye Mazkur va Nasrollah
- Nesah-ye Mohammad Taher
- Nesah-ye Olya
- Nesah-ye Sofla
