= Sivaki-ye Jalil =

Village in Kohgiluyeh and Boyer-Ahmad province, Iran

Sivaki-ye Jalil Persian: سيوكي جليل
- Village
- Location within Iran
- Coordinates: 30°37′57″N 51°18′22″E
- Country: Iran
- Province: Kohgiluyeh and Boyer-Ahmad
- County: Boyer-Ahmad
- District: Sepidar
- Rural District: Sivaki

Population (2016)
  - Total: 676
- Time zone: UTC+3:30 (IRST)

Sivaki-ye Jalil (Persian: سيوكي جليل) (Note: Also romanized as Sīvakī-ye Jalīl; also known as Sīvakī) is a village in, and the capital of, Sivaki Rural District of Sepidar District, Boyer-Ahmad County, Kohgiluyeh and Boyer-Ahmad province, Iran.

== Demographics ==
=== Population ===
At the time of the 2006 National Census, the village's population was 646 in 125 households, when it was in Sepidar Rural District of the Central District. The following census in 2011 counted 654 people in 143 households. The 2016 census measured the population of the village as 676 people in 167 households.

After the census, the rural district was separated from the district in the formation of Sepidar District, and Sivaki-ye Jalil was transferred to Sivaki Rural District created in the new district.
