= Darreh Mari-ye Babakan =

Darreh Mari-ye Babakan دره ماري بابكان
- Village
- Location within Iran
- Coordinates: 30°40′34″N 51°14′13″E
- Country: Iran
- Province: Kohgiluyeh and Boyer-Ahmad
- County: Boyer-Ahmad
- Bakhsh: Central
- Rural District: Sepidar

Population (2006)
  - Total: 128
- Time zone: UTC+3:30 (IRST)
  - Summer (DST): UTC+4:30 (IRDT)

Darreh Mari-ye Babakan (Persian: دره ماري بابكان, also Romanized as Darreh Mārī-ye Bābakān; also known as Darreh Mārī) is a village in Sepidar Rural District, in the Central District of Boyer-Ahmad County, Kohgiluyeh and Boyer-Ahmad Province, Iran. At the 2006 census, its population was 128, in 22 families.
