= Chat Barik-e Jahanabad =

Chat Barik-e Jahanabad چات باريك جهان اباد
- Village
- Location within Iran
- Coordinates: 30°30′57″N 51°27′38″E
- Country: Iran
- Province: Kohgiluyeh and Boyer-Ahmad
- County: Boyer-Ahmad
- Bakhsh: Central
- Rural District: Dasht-e Rum

Population (2006)
  - Total: 298
- Time zone: UTC+3:30 (IRST)
  - Summer (DST): UTC+4:30 (IRDT)

Chat Barik-e Jahanabad (Persian: چات باريك جهان اباد, also Romanized as Chāt Bārīk-e Jahānābād; also known as Chāt Bārīk) is a village in Dasht-e Rum Rural District, in the Central District of Boyer-Ahmad County, Kohgiluyeh and Boyer-Ahmad Province, Iran. At the 2006 census, its population was 298, in 62 families.
