= Kal Qanat-e Jahanabad =

Kal Qanat-e Jahanabad كل قنات جهان اباد
- Village
- Location within Iran
- Coordinates: 30°33′02″N 51°33′12″E
- Country: Iran
- Province: Kohgiluyeh and Boyer-Ahmad
- County: Boyer-Ahmad
- Bakhsh: Central
- Rural District: Dasht-e Rum

Population (2006)
  - Total: 49
- Time zone: UTC+3:30 (IRST)
  - Summer (DST): UTC+4:30 (IRDT)

Kal Qanat-e Jahanabad (Persian: كل قنات جهان اباد, also Romanized as Kal Qanāt-e Jahānābād; also known as Kal Qanāt) is a village in Dasht-e Rum Rural District, in the Central District of Boyer-Ahmad County, Kohgiluyeh and Boyer-Ahmad Province, Iran. At the 2006 census, its population was 49, in 9 families.
