= Bard-e Khiari =

Neighborhood in Kohgiluyeh and Boyer-Ahmad province, Iran

Bard-e Khiari Persian: بردخياري
- Neighborhood
- Location within Iran
- Coordinates: 30°38′46″N 51°24′25″E
- Country: Iran
- Province: Kohgiluyeh and Boyer-Ahmad
- County: Boyer-Ahmad
- District: Central
- Rural District: Dasht-e Rum
- Village: Amirabad

Population (2016)
  - Total: 50
- Time zone: UTC+3:30 (IRST)

Bard-e Khiari (Persian: بردخياري) (Note: Also romanized as Bard-e Khīārī) is a neighborhood in the village of Amirabad in Dasht-e Rum Rural District of the Central District in Boyer-Ahmad County, Kohgiluyeh and Boyer-Ahmad province, Iran.

== Demographics ==
=== Population ===
At the time of the 2006 National Census, Bard-e Khiari's population was 80 in 15 households, when it was a village in Dasht-e Rum Rural District. The following census in 2011 counted 57 people in 13 households. The 2016 census measured the population of the village as 50 people in 14 households.

In 2021, Amirabad-e Sofla merged with the village of Bard-e Khiari to form the village of Amirabad.
