= Molehbarik-e Babakan =

Molehbarik-e Babakan مله باريك بابكان
- Village
- Location within Iran
- Coordinates: 30°41′16″N 51°15′31″E
- Country: Iran
- Province: Kohgiluyeh and Boyer-Ahmad
- County: Boyer-Ahmad
- Bakhsh: Central
- Rural District: Sepidar

Population (2006)
  - Total: 115
- Time zone: UTC+3:30 (IRST)
  - Summer (DST): UTC+4:30 (IRDT)

Molehbarik-e Babakan (Persian: مله باريك بابكان, also Romanized as Molehbārīk-e Bābakān) is a village in Sepidar Rural District, in the Central District of Boyer-Ahmad County, Kohgiluyeh and Boyer-Ahmad Province, Iran. At the 2006 census, its population was 115, in 26 families.
