= Ab Gerdu =

Ab Gerdu ابگردو
- Village
- Location within Iran
- Coordinates: 30°39′20″N 51°26′53″E
- Country: Iran
- Province: Kohgiluyeh and Boyer-Ahmad
- County: Boyer-Ahmad
- Bakhsh: Central
- Rural District: Dasht-e Rum

Population (2006)
  - Total: 212
- Time zone: UTC+3:30 (IRST)
  - Summer (DST): UTC+4:30 (IRDT)

Ab Gerdu (Persian: ابگردو, also Romanized as Āb Gerdū) is a village in Dasht-e Rum Rural District, in the Central District of Boyer-Ahmad County, Kohgiluyeh and Boyer-Ahmad Province, Iran. At the 2006 census, its population was 212, in 46 families.
