= Cheshmeh Tagi =

Cheshmeh Tagi چشمه تاگي
- Village
- Location within Iran
- Coordinates: 30°38′15″N 51°23′38″E
- Country: Iran
- Province: Kohgiluyeh and Boyer-Ahmad
- County: Boyer-Ahmad
- Bakhsh: Central
- Rural District: Dasht-e Rum

Population (2006)
  - Total: 50
- Time zone: UTC+3:30 (IRST)
  - Summer (DST): UTC+4:30 (IRDT)

Cheshmeh Tagi (Persian: چشمه تاگي, also Romanized as Cheshmeh Tāgī; also known as Cheshmeh Tākī) is a village in Dasht-e Rum Rural District, in the Central District of Boyer-Ahmad County, Kohgiluyeh and Boyer-Ahmad Province, Iran. At the 2006 census, its population was 50, in 9 families.
