= Tali Shahi-ye Olya =

Tali Shahi-ye Olya تاليشه عليا
- Village
- Location within Iran
- Coordinates: 30°30′09″N 51°26′35″E
- Country: Iran
- Province: Kohgiluyeh and Boyer-Ahmad
- County: Boyer-Ahmad
- Bakhsh: Central
- Rural District: Sepidar

Population (2006)
  - Total: 16
- Time zone: UTC+3:30 (IRST)
  - Summer (DST): UTC+4:30 (IRDT)

Tali Shahi-ye Olya (Persian: تاليشه عليا, also Romanized as Tālī Shāhī-ye ‘Olyā; also known as Tālī Shāhī) is a village in Sepidar Rural District, in the Central District of Boyer-Ahmad County, Kohgiluyeh and Boyer-Ahmad Province, Iran. At the 2006 census, its population was 16, in 6 families.
