= Rajuneh Kari =

Rajuneh Kari راجونه كاري
- Village
- Location within Iran
- Coordinates: 30°30′20″N 51°24′12″E
- Country: Iran
- Province: Kohgiluyeh and Boyer-Ahmad
- County: Boyer-Ahmad
- Bakhsh: Central
- Rural District: Sepidar

Population (2006)
  - Total: 142
- Time zone: UTC+3:30 (IRST)
  - Summer (DST): UTC+4:30 (IRDT)

Rajuneh Kari (Persian: راجونه كاري, also Romanized as Rājūneh Kārī and Rejūneh Kārī; also known as Rājū Nekārī and Rejūneh Dān) is a village in Sepidar Rural District, in the Central District of Boyer-Ahmad County, Kohgiluyeh and Boyer-Ahmad Province, Iran. At the 2006 census, its population was 142, in 26 families.
