= Chal Kub Pereshkaft =

Chal Kub Pereshkaft چال كوب پراشكفت
- Village
- Location within Iran
- Coordinates: 30°42′17″N 51°16′06″E
- Country: Iran
- Province: Kohgiluyeh and Boyer-Ahmad
- County: Boyer-Ahmad
- Bakhsh: Central
- Rural District: Dasht-e Rum

Population (2006)
  - Total: 34
- Time zone: UTC+3:30 (IRST)
  - Summer (DST): UTC+4:30 (IRDT)

Chal Kub Pereshkaft (Persian: چال كوب پراشكفت, also Romanized as Chāl Kūb Pereshkaft; also known as Chāl Kūb) is a village in Dasht-e Rum Rural District, in the Central District of Boyer-Ahmad County, Kohgiluyeh and Boyer-Ahmad Province, Iran. At the 2006 census, its population was 34, in 8 families.
