= Pazanan =

Village in Kohgiluyeh and Boyer-Ahmad province, Iran

Pazanan Persian: پازنان
- Village
- Location within Iran
- Coordinates: 30°35′22″N 51°22′43″E
- Country: Iran
- Province: Kohgiluyeh and Boyer-Ahmad
- County: Boyer-Ahmad
- District: Sepidar
- Rural District: Sepidar

Population (2016)
  - Total: 186
- Time zone: UTC+3:30 (IRST)

Pazanan (Persian: پازنان) (Note: Also romanized as Pāzanān) is a village in, and the capital of, Sepidar Rural District of Sepidar District, Boyer-Ahmad County, Kohgiluyeh and Boyer-Ahmad province, Iran. The previous capital of the rural district was the village of Sepidar, now a city.

== Demographics ==
=== Population ===
At the time of the 2006 National Census, the village's population was 201 in 37 households, when it was in the Central District. The following census in 2011 counted 167 people in 40 households. The 2016 census measured the population of the village as 186 people in 55 households.

After the census, the rural district was separated from the district in the establishment of Sepidar District.
