= Gholam Ali Pirvezg =

Gholam Ali Pirvezg غلامعلي پيروزگ
- Village
- Country: Iran
- Province: Kohgiluyeh and Boyer-Ahmad
- County: Boyer-Ahmad
- Bakhsh: Central
- Rural District: Dasht-e Rum

Population (2006)
  - Total: 28
- Time zone: UTC+3:30 (IRST)
  - Summer (DST): UTC+4:30 (IRDT)

Gholam Ali Pirvezg (Persian: غلامعلي پيروزگ, also Romanized as Gholām ʿAlī Pīrvezg) is a village in Dasht-e Rum Rural District, in the Central District of Boyer-Ahmad County, Kohgiluyeh and Boyer-Ahmad Province, Iran. At the 2006 census, its population was 28, in 5 families.
