= Cheshmeh Roqat =

Cheshmeh Roqat چشمه رقات
- Village
- Location within Iran
- Coordinates: 30°40′11″N 51°22′18″E
- Country: Iran
- Province: Kohgiluyeh and Boyer-Ahmad
- County: Boyer-Ahmad
- Bakhsh: Central
- Rural District: Dasht-e Rum

Population (2006)
  - Total: 46
- Time zone: UTC+3:30 (IRST)
  - Summer (DST): UTC+4:30 (IRDT)

Cheshmeh Roqat (Persian: چشمه رقات, also Romanized as Cheshmeh Roqāt; also known as Cheshmeh Roghāţ) is a village in Dasht-e Rum Rural District, in the Central District of Boyer-Ahmad County, Kohgiluyeh and Boyer-Ahmad Province, Iran. At the 2006 census, its population was 46, in 13 families.
