= Cheshmeh Balutak =

Cheshmeh Balutak چشمه بلوطك
- Village
- Location within Iran
- Coordinates: 30°37′26″N 51°24′21″E
- Country: Iran
- Province: Kohgiluyeh and Boyer-Ahmad
- County: Boyer-Ahmad
- Bakhsh: Central
- Rural District: Dasht-e Rum

Population (2006)
  - Total: 65
- Time zone: UTC+3:30 (IRST)
  - Summer (DST): UTC+4:30 (IRDT)

Cheshmeh Balutak (Persian: چشمه بلوطك, also Romanized as Cheshmeh Balūţak) is a village in Dasht-e Rum Rural District, in the Central District of Boyer-Ahmad County, Kohgiluyeh and Boyer-Ahmad Province, Iran. At the 2006 census, its population was 65, in 12 families.
