= Tall Seyyed Fakhr Ahmad =

Tall Seyyed Fakhr Ahmad تل سيدفخراحمد
- Village
- Location within Iran
- Coordinates: 30°35′42″N 51°22′37″E
- Country: Iran
- Province: Kohgiluyeh and Boyer-Ahmad
- County: Boyer-Ahmad
- Bakhsh: Central
- Rural District: Sepidar

Population (2006)
  - Total: 169
- Time zone: UTC+3:30 (IRST)
  - Summer (DST): UTC+4:30 (IRDT)

Tall Seyyed Fakhr Ahmad (Persian: تل سيدفخراحمد, also Romanized as Tall Seyyed Fakhr Aḩmad; also known as Seyyed Fakhr Aḩmad) is a village in Sepidar Rural District, in the Central District of Boyer-Ahmad County, Kohgiluyeh and Boyer-Ahmad Province, Iran. At the 2006 census, its population was 169, in 28 families.
