= Amirabad-e Sofla =

Neighborhood in Kohgiluyeh and Boyer-Ahmad province, Iran

Amirabad-e Sofla Persian: اميرابادسفلي
- Neighborhood
- Location within Iran
- Coordinates: 30°35′56″N 51°27′53″E
- Country: Iran
- Province: Kohgiluyeh and Boyer-Ahmad
- County: Boyer-Ahmad
- District: Central
- Rural District: Dasht-e Rum
- Village: Amirabad

Population (2016)
  - Total: 102
- Time zone: UTC+3:30 (IRST)

Amirabad-e Sofla (Persian: اميرابادسفلي) (Note: Also romanized as Amīrābād-e Soflá; also known as Amīrābād and Amīrābād-e Pā’īn) is a neighborhood in the village of Amirabad in Dasht-e Rum Rural District of the Central District in Boyer-Ahmad County, Kohgiluyeh and Boyer-Ahmad province, Iran.

== Demographics ==
=== Population ===
At the time of the 2006 National Census, Amirabad-e Sofla's population was 77 in 18 households, when it was a village in Dasht-e Rum Rural District. The following census in 2011 counted 99 people in 23 households. The 2016 census measured the population of the village as 102 people in 28 households.

In 2021, Amirabad-e Sofla merged with the village of Bard-e Khiari to form the village of Amirabad.
