= Naqareh Khaneh =

Naqareh Khaneh or Neqareh Khaneh (Persian: نقاره خانه), also rendered as Naghareh Khaneh, may refer to:

- Neqareh Khaneh, Fars
- Neqareh Khaneh, Kohgiluyeh and Boyer-Ahmad
- Naqareh Khaneh-ye Filgah, Kohgiluyeh and Boyer-Ahmad Province
- Naqareh Khaneh, Razavi Khorasan
