= Gowd-e Belhi =

Gowd-e Belhi گودبلهي
- Village
- Location within Iran
- Coordinates: 30°27′44″N 51°29′40″E
- Country: Iran
- Province: Kohgiluyeh and Boyer-Ahmad
- County: Boyer-Ahmad
- Bakhsh: Central
- Rural District: Dasht-e Rum

Population (2006)
  - Total: 20
- Time zone: UTC+3:30 (IRST)
  - Summer (DST): UTC+4:30 (IRDT)

Gowd-e Belhi (Persian: گودبلهي, also Romanized as Gowd-e Belhī; also known as Gowd-e Dūl) is a village in Dasht-e Rum Rural District, in the Central District of Boyer-Ahmad County, Kohgiluyeh and Boyer-Ahmad Province, Iran. At the 2006 census, its population was 20, in 5 families.
