= Deli Bejak-e Sefidar =

Deli Bejak-e Sefidar دلي بجك سفيدار
- Village
- Location within Iran
- Coordinates: 30°31′43″N 51°28′04″E
- Country: Iran
- Province: Kohgiluyeh and Boyer-Ahmad
- County: Boyer-Ahmad
- Bakhsh: Central
- Rural District: Sepidar

Population (2006)
  - Total: 50
- Time zone: UTC+3:30 (IRST)
  - Summer (DST): UTC+4:30 (IRDT)

Deli Bejak-e Sefidar (Persian: دلي بجك سفيدار, also Romanized as Delī Bejak-e Sefīdār; also known as Delī Bejak and Polī Bejak-e Sefīdār) is a village in Sepidar Rural District, in the Central District of Boyer-Ahmad County, Kohgiluyeh and Boyer-Ahmad Province, Iran. At the 2006 census, its population was 50, in 9 families.
