= Dam Sefidar =

Dam Sefidar دم سفيدار
- Village
- Location within Iran
- Coordinates: 30°39′28″N 51°20′24″E
- Country: Iran
- Province: Kohgiluyeh and Boyer-Ahmad
- County: Boyer-Ahmad
- Bakhsh: Central
- Rural District: Sepidar

Population (2006)
  - Total: 75
- Time zone: UTC+3:30 (IRST)
  - Summer (DST): UTC+4:30 (IRDT)

Dam Sefidar (Persian: دم سفيدار, also Romanized as Dam Sefīdār; also known as Dam Sepīdār) is a village in Sepidar Rural District, in the Central District of Boyer-Ahmad County, Kohgiluyeh and Boyer-Ahmad Province, Iran. At the 2006 census, its population was 75, in 17 families.
