= Dowruhan-e Jalil =

Dowruhan-e Jalil دروهان جليل
- Village
- Location within Iran
- Coordinates: 30°40′09″N 51°16′09″E
- Country: Iran
- Province: Kohgiluyeh and Boyer-Ahmad
- County: Boyer-Ahmad
- Bakhsh: Central
- Rural District: Sepidar

Population (2006)
  - Total: 140
- Time zone: UTC+3:30 (IRST)
  - Summer (DST): UTC+4:30 (IRDT)

Dowruhan-e Jalil (Persian: دروهان جليل, also Romanized as Dowrūhān-e Jalīl; also known as Dowrūhān) is a village in Sepidar Rural District, in the Central District of Boyer-Ahmad County, Kohgiluyeh and Boyer-Ahmad Province, Iran. At the 2006 census, its population was 140, in 25 families.
