= Cheshmeh Chenar-e Yasuj =

Village in Kohgiluyeh and Boyer-Ahmad, Iran

Cheshmeh Chenar-e Yasuj چشمه چنارياسوج
- Village
- Location within Iran
- Coordinates: 30°27′47″N 51°44′40″E
- Country: Iran
- Province: Kohgiluyeh and Boyer-Ahmad
- County: Boyer-Ahmad
- Bakhsh: Central
- Rural District: Kakan

Population (2006)
  - Total: 100
- Time zone: UTC+3:30 (IRST)
  - Summer (DST): UTC+4:30 (IRDT)

Cheshmeh Chenar-e Yasuj (Persian: چشمه چنارياسوج, also Romanized as Cheshmeh Chenār-e Yāsūj; also known as Cheshmeh Chenār) is a village in Kakan Rural District, in the Central District of Boyer-Ahmad County, Kohgiluyeh and Boyer-Ahmad Province, Iran. At the 2006 census, its population was 100, in 22 families.
