= Si Larestan-e Jowzar =

Si Larestan-e Jowzar سي لارستان جوزار
- Village
- Location within Iran
- Coordinates: 30°46′00″N 51°19′00″E
- Country: Iran
- Province: Kohgiluyeh and Boyer-Ahmad
- County: Dana
- Bakhsh: Kabgian
- Rural District: Kabgian

Population (2006)
  - Total: 71
- Time zone: UTC+3:30 (IRST)
  - Summer (DST): UTC+4:30 (IRDT)

Si Larestan-e Jowzar (Persian: سي لارستان جوزار, also Romanized as Sī Lārestān-e Jowzār; also known as Sī Lārestān) is a village in Kabgian Rural District, Kabgian District, Dana County, Kohgiluyeh and Boyer-Ahmad Province, Iran. At the 2006 census, its population was 71, in 13 families.
