= Muger, Boyer-Ahmad =

Village in Kohgiluyeh and Boyer-Ahmad province, Iran

Muger Persian: موگر
- Village
- Location within Iran
- Coordinates: 30°54′20″N 51°11′56″E
- Country: Iran
- Province: Kohgiluyeh and Boyer-Ahmad
- County: Boyer-Ahmad
- District: Kabgian
- Rural District: Chenar

Population (2016)
  - Total: 587
- Time zone: UTC+3:30 (IRST)

Muger (Persian: موگر) (Note: Also romanized as Mūger; also known as Mūger-e Pā’īn) is a village in Chenar Rural District of Kabgian District, Boyer-Ahmad County, Kohgiluyeh and Boyer-Ahmad province, Iran.

== Demographics ==
=== Population ===
At the time of the 2006 National Census, the village's population was 556 in 122 households, when it was in Dana County. The following census in 2011 counted 614 people in 166 households. The 2016 census measured the population of the village as 587 people in 150 households, by which time the district had been separated from the county to join Boyer-Ahmad County. It was the most populous village in its rural district.
