= Gerdaveh =

Gerdaveh گردوه
- Village
- Location within Iran
- Coordinates: 30°50′48″N 51°18′36″E
- Country: Iran
- Province: Kohgiluyeh and Boyer-Ahmad
- County: Dana
- Bakhsh: Kabgian
- Rural District: Kabgian

Population (2006)
  - Total: 604
- Time zone: UTC+3:30 (IRST)
  - Summer (DST): UTC+4:30 (IRDT)

Gerdaveh (Persian: گردوه, also Romanized as Gerdāveh; also known as Gerdeva) is a village in Kabgian Rural District, Kabgian District, Dana County, Kohgiluyeh and Boyer-Ahmad Province, Iran. At the 2006 census, its population was 604, in 119 families.
