= Nesah-ye Mazkur va Nasrollah =

Nesah-ye Mazkur va Nasrollah نسه مذكورونصراله
- Village
- Country: Iran
- Province: Kohgiluyeh and Boyer-Ahmad
- County: Boyer-Ahmad
- Bakhsh: Central
- Rural District: Sepidar

Population (2006)
  - Total: 24
- Time zone: UTC+3:30 (IRST)
  - Summer (DST): UTC+4:30 (IRDT)

Nesah-ye Mazkur va Nasrollah (Persian: نسه مذكورونصراله, also Romanized as Nesah-ye Maẕkūr va Naṣrollah) is a village in Sepidar Rural District, in the Central District of Boyer-Ahmad County, Kohgiluyeh and Boyer-Ahmad Province, Iran. At the 2006 census, its population was 24, with 4 families.
