= Nesah Kuh =

Nesah Kuh (Persian: نسه كوه), also rendered as Nesa Kuh, may refer to:

- Nesah Kuh Ali Chin
- Nesa Kuh-e Bard
- Nesah Kuh Veysi Chin
