= Cheshmeh Dozdak =

Cheshmeh Dozdak (Persian: چشمه دزدك) may refer to:

- Cheshmeh Dozdak-e Olya
- Cheshmeh Dozdak-e Sofla
