= Nesah-ye Sofla =

Nesah-ye Sofla نسه سفلي
- Village
- Location within Iran
- Coordinates: 30°29′05″N 51°25′03″E
- Country: Iran
- Province: Kohgiluyeh and Boyer-Ahmad
- County: Boyer-Ahmad
- Bakhsh: Central
- Rural District: Sepidar

Population (2006)
  - Total: 87
- Time zone: UTC+3:30 (IRST)
  - Summer (DST): UTC+4:30 (IRDT)

Nesah-ye Sofla (Persian: نسه سفلي, also Romanized as Nesah-ye Soflá; also known as Nesah-ye Mollā Ghaz̧anfar) is a village in Sepidar Rural District, in the Central District of Boyer-Ahmad County, Kohgiluyeh and Boyer-Ahmad Province, Iran. At the 2006 census, its population was 87, in 13 families.
