= Khahki-ye Chitab =

Khahki-ye Chitab خهكي چيتاب
- Village
- Country: Iran
- Province: Kohgiluyeh and Boyer-Ahmad
- County: Dana
- Bakhsh: Kabgian
- Rural District: Kabgian

Population (2006)
  - Total: 19
- Time zone: UTC+3:30 (IRST)
  - Summer (DST): UTC+4:30 (IRDT)

For the color, see Khaki

Khahki-ye Chitab (Persian: خهكي چيتاب, also Romanized as khahkī-ye Chītāb) is a village in Kabgian Rural District, Kabgian District, Dana County, Kohgiluyeh and Boyer-Ahmad Province, Iran. At the 2006 census, its population was 19, in 7 families.
