= Cheshmeh Bah Meleh Khomsir =

Cheshmeh Bah Meleh Khomsir چشمه به مله خمسير
- Village
- Country: Iran
- Province: Kohgiluyeh and Boyer-Ahmad
- County: Dana
- Bakhsh: Kabgian
- Rural District: Kabgian

Population (2006)
  - Total: 96
- Time zone: UTC+3:30 (IRST)
  - Summer (DST): UTC+4:30 (IRDT)

Cheshmeh Bah Meleh Khomsir (Persian: چشمه به مله خمسير, also romanized as Cheshmeh Bah Meleh Khomsīr) is a village in Kabgian Rural District, Kabgian District, Dana County, Kohgiluyeh and Boyer-Ahmad Province, Iran. At the 2006 census, its population was 96, in 23 families.
