= Darreh Gudarzi =

Darreh Gudarzi دره گودرزي
- Village
- Location within Iran
- Coordinates: 30°44′24″N 51°20′09″E
- Country: Iran
- Province: Kohgiluyeh and Boyer-Ahmad
- County: Dana
- Bakhsh: Kabgian
- Rural District: Kabgian

Population (2006)
  - Total: 42
- Time zone: UTC+3:30 (IRST)
  - Summer (DST): UTC+4:30 (IRDT)

Darreh Gudarzi (Persian: دره گودرزي, also Romanized as Darreh Gūdarzī) is a village in Kabgian Rural District, Kabgian District, Dana County, Kohgiluyeh and Boyer-Ahmad Province, Iran. At the 2006 census, its population was 42, in 9 families.
