= Hoseynabad-e Olya, Kohgiluyeh and Boyer-Ahmad =

Village in Kohgiluyeh and Boyer-Ahmad province, Iran

Hoseynabad-e Olya Persian: حسين اباد عليا
- Village
- Location within Iran
- Coordinates: 30°36′12″N 51°30′49″E
- Country: Iran
- Province: Kohgiluyeh and Boyer-Ahmad
- County: Boyer-Ahmad
- District: Central
- Rural District: Dasht-e Rum

Population (2016)
  - Total: 799
- Time zone: UTC+3:30 (IRST)

Hoseynabad-e Olya (Persian: حسين ابادعليا) (Note: Also romanized as Ḩoseynābād-e ‘Olyā; also known as Ḩoseynābād) is a village in, and the capital of, Dasht-e Rum Rural District of the Central District of Boyer-Ahmad County, Kohgiluyeh and Boyer-Ahmad province, Iran.

== Demographics ==
=== Population ===
At the time of the 2006 National Census, the village's population was 782 in 163 households. The following census in 2011 counted 957 people in 241 households. The 2016 census measured the population of the village as 799 people in 222 households.
