= Abbas Ali Khani =

Village in Kohgiluyeh and Boyer-Ahmad province, Iran

Abbas Ali Khani Persian: عباسعلي خاني
- Village
- Location within Iran
- Coordinates: 30°37′34″N 51°47′48″E
- Country: Iran
- Province: Kohgiluyeh and Boyer-Ahmad
- County: Boyer-Ahmad
- District: Central
- Rural District: Kakan

Population (2016)
  - Total: 321
- Time zone: UTC+3:30 (IRST)

Abbas Ali Khani (Persian: عباسعلي خاني, also romanized as ʿAbbās ʿAlī Khānī) is a village in, and the former capital of, Kakan Rural District of the Central District of Boyer-Ahmad County, Kohgiluyeh and Boyer-Ahmad province, Iran. The capital of the rural district has been transferred to the village of Mansurkhani. (Note: Also known as Pasduran)

== Demographics ==
=== Population ===
At the time of the 2006 National Census, the village's population was 423 in 88 households. The following census in 2011 counted 362 people in 97 households. The 2016 census measured the population of the village as 321 people in 98 households.
