= Garr-e Kalagh Neshin-e Amirabad =

Garr-e Kalagh Neshin-e Amirabad گركلاغ نشين اميراباد
- Village
- Location within Iran
- Coordinates: 30°33′35″N 51°30′39″E
- Country: Iran
- Province: Kohgiluyeh and Boyer-Ahmad
- County: Boyer-Ahmad
- Bakhsh: Central
- Rural District: Dasht-e Rum

Population (2006)
  - Total: 199
- Time zone: UTC+3:30 (IRST)
  - Summer (DST): UTC+4:30 (IRDT)

Garr-e Kalagh Neshin-e Amirabad (Persian: گركلاغ نشين اميراباد, also Romanized as Garr-e Kalāgh Neshīn-e Amīrābād; also known as Garr-e Kalāgh Neshīn) is a village in Dasht-e Rum Rural District, in the Central District of Boyer-Ahmad County, Kohgiluyeh and Boyer-Ahmad Province, Iran. At the 2006 census, its population was 199, in 35 families.
