= Mahur Sabz-e Neqareh Khaneh =

Mahur Sabz-e Neqareh Khaneh ماهورسبزنقاره خانه
- Village
- Location within Iran
- Coordinates: 30°46′08″N 51°21′51″E
- Country: Iran
- Province: Kohgiluyeh and Boyer-Ahmad
- County: Dana
- Bakhsh: Kabgian
- Rural District: Kabgian

Population (2006)
  - Total: 40
- Time zone: UTC+3:30 (IRST)
  - Summer (DST): UTC+4:30 (IRDT)

Mahur Sabz-e Neqareh Khaneh (Persian: ماهورسبزنقاره خانه, also Romanized as Māhūr Sabz-e Neqāreh Khāneh; also known as Māhūr Sabz and Mor Sabz) is a village in Kabgian Rural District, Kabgian District, Dana County, Kohgiluyeh and Boyer-Ahmad Province, Iran. At the 2006 census, its population was 40, in 9 families.
