= Siseh Garag =

Siseh Garag (Persian: سيسه گرگ) may refer to:

- Siseh Garag-e Olya
- Siseh Garag-e Sofla
