= Zurabad =

Zurabad or Zoor Abad (Persian: زور آباد), also rendered as Zuhrabad, may refer to:

- Zurabad, alternate name of Jahanabad, Dorud, Lorestan
- Zurabad, Razavi Khorasan
- Zurabad, Hirmand, Sistan and Baluchestan Province
- Zurabad, West Azerbaijan
