= Cheshmeh Sib =

Cheshmeh Sib or Cheshmeh-ye Sib (Persian: چشمه سيب) may refer to:

- Cheshmeh-ye Sib Deli Gerdu Sofla
- Cheshmeh Sib-e Deli Khomsir
