= Kabgian =

Kabgian (Persian: کبگیان) may refer to:

- Kabgian District
- Kabgian Rural District
