= Balut-e Karavan =

Balut-e Karavan بلوطكارون
- Village
- Location within Iran
- Coordinates: 30°47′05″N 51°20′35″E
- Country: Iran
- Province: Kohgiluyeh and Boyer-Ahmad
- County: Dana
- Bakhsh: Kabgian
- Rural District: Kabgian

Population (2006)
  - Total: 97
- Time zone: UTC+3:30 (IRST)
  - Summer (DST): UTC+4:30 (IRDT)

Balut-e Karavan (Persian: بلوطكارون, also Romanized as Balūţ-e Kāravān, Balūt-e Kārevān, and Balūţ Kāravān; also known as Balūk-e Kāravān) is a village in Kabgian Rural District, Kabgian District, Dana County, Kohgiluyeh and Boyer-Ahmad Province, Iran. At the 2006 census, its population was 97, in 25 families.
