= Gandom Kesh-e Chitab =

Gandom Kesh-e Chitab گندم كش چيتاب
- Village
- Location within Iran
- Coordinates: 30°49′12″N 51°14′05″E
- Country: Iran
- Province: Kohgiluyeh and Boyer-Ahmad
- County: Dana
- Bakhsh: Kabgian
- Rural District: Chenar

Population (2006)
  - Total: 100
- Time zone: UTC+3:30 (IRST)
  - Summer (DST): UTC+4:30 (IRDT)

Gandom Kesh-e Chitab (Persian: گندم كش چيتاب, also Romanized as Gandom Kesh-e Chītāb; also known as Gandom Kesh) is a village in Chenar Rural District, Kabgian District, Dana County, Kohgiluyeh and Boyer-Ahmad Province, Iran. At the 2006 census, its population was 100, in 17 families.
