= Buneh Rizak-e Chenar =

Buneh Rizak-e Chenar بونه ريزك چنار
- Village
- Location within Iran
- Coordinates: 30°52′37″N 51°08′28″E
- Country: Iran
- Province: Kohgiluyeh and Boyer-Ahmad
- County: Dana
- Bakhsh: Kabgian
- Rural District: Chenar

Population (2006)
  - Total: 41
- Time zone: UTC+3:30 (IRST)
  - Summer (DST): UTC+4:30 (IRDT)

Buneh Rizak-e Chenar (Persian: بونه ريزك چنار, also Romanized as Būneh Rīzak-e Chenār; also known as Būneh Rīzak) is a village in Chenar Rural District, Kabgian District, Dana County, Kohgiluyeh and Boyer-Ahmad Province, Iran. As of the 2006 census, its population was 41, with there being 9 families.
