= Darreh Key =

Darreh Key (Persian: دره كي) may refer to:

- Darreh Key Ali Khani
- Darreh Key Salehi
