= Tangari, Iran =

Village in Kohgiluyeh and Boyer-Ahmad province, Iran

Tangari Persian: تنگاري
- Village
- Location within Iran
- Coordinates: 30°31′38″N 51°32′09″E
- Country: Iran
- Province: Kohgiluyeh and Boyer-Ahmad
- County: Boyer-Ahmad
- District: Central
- Rural District: Dasht-e Rum

Population (2016)
  - Total: 1,885
- Time zone: UTC+3:30 (IRST)

Tangari (Persian: تنگاري) (Note: Also romanized as Tangārī) is a village in Dasht-e Rum Rural District of the Central District of Boyer-Ahmad County, Kohgiluyeh and Boyer-Ahmad province, Iran.

== Demographics ==
=== Population ===
At the time of the 2006 National Census, the village's population was 1,675 in 330 households. The following census in 2011 counted 1,654 people in 396 households. The 2016 census measured the population of the village as 1,885 people in 535 households. It was the most populous village in its rural district.
