= Khoshkedan =

Khoshkedan (Persian: خشكدان) may refer to:

- Khoshkedan-e Babakan, a village in Iran
- Khoshkedan-e Olya, a village in Iran
