= Sivaki Rural District =

Rural district in Kohgiluyeh and Boyer-Ahmad province, Iran

Sivaki Rural District Persian: دهستان سیوکی
- Rural District
- Location within Iran
- Coordinates: 30°44′16″N 51°10′38″E
- Country: Iran
- Province: Kohgiluyeh and Boyer-Ahmad
- County: Boyer-Ahmad
- District: Sepidar
- Capital: Sivaki-ye Jalil
- Time zone: UTC+3:30 (IRST)

Sivaki Rural District (Persian: دهستان سیوکی) is in Sepidar District of Boyer-Ahmad County, Kohgiluyeh and Boyer-Ahmad province, Iran. Its capital is the village Sivaki-ye Jalil, whose population at the time of the 2016 National Census was 676 in 167 households.

== History ==
After the 2016 census, Sepidar Rural District was separated from the Central District in the formation of Sepidar District, and Sivaki Rural District was created in the new district.
