= Sarchenar =

Sarchenar or Sar Chenar or Sar-e Chenar (Persian: سرچنار) may refer to:

- Sarchenar, Khuzestan
- Sar Chenar, Kohgiluyeh and Boyer-Ahmad
- Sarchenar, West Azerbaijan
