= Mian Chenar-e Mazkur =

Mian Chenar-e Mazkur ميان چنارمذكور
- Village
- Location within Iran
- Coordinates: 30°52′19″N 51°09′55″E
- Country: Iran
- Province: Kohgiluyeh and Boyer-Ahmad
- County: Dana
- Bakhsh: Kabgian
- Rural District: Chenar

Population (2006)
  - Total: 31
- Time zone: UTC+3:30 (IRST)
  - Summer (DST): UTC+4:30 (IRDT)

Mian Chenar-e Mazkur (Persian: ميان چنارمذكور, also Romanized as Mīān Chenār-e Maẕkūr; also known as Meyān Chenār and Mīān Chenār) is a village in Chenar Rural District, Kabgian District, Dana County, Kohgiluyeh and Boyer-Ahmad Province, Iran. At the 2006 census, its population was 31, in 7 families.
