= Siseh Garag-e Olya =

Siseh Garag-e Olya سيسه گرگ عليا
- Village
- Location within Iran
- Coordinates: 30°35′00″N 51°24′00″E
- Country: Iran
- Province: Kohgiluyeh and Boyer-Ahmad
- County: Boyer-Ahmad
- Bakhsh: Central
- Rural District: Sepidar

Population (2006)
  - Total: 131
- Time zone: UTC+3:30 (IRST)
  - Summer (DST): UTC+4:30 (IRDT)

Siseh Garag-e Olya (Persian: سيسه گرگ عليا, also Romanized as Sīseh Garag-e ‘Olyā; also known as Sīseh Garag-e Bālā) is a village in Sepidar Rural District, in the Central District of Boyer-Ahmad County, Kohgiluyeh and Boyer-Ahmad Province, Iran. At the 2006 census, its population was 131, in 29 families.
