= Nesah-ye Mohammad Taher =

Nesah-ye Mohammad Taher نسه محمدطاهر
- Village
- Country: Iran
- Province: Kohgiluyeh and Boyer-Ahmad
- County: Boyer-Ahmad
- Bakhsh: Central
- Rural District: Sepidar

Population (2006)
  - Total: 161
- Time zone: UTC+3:30 (IRST)
  - Summer (DST): UTC+4:30 (IRDT)

Nesah-ye Mohammad Taher (Persian: نسه محمدطاهر, also Romanized as Nesah-ye Moḩammad Ţāher) is a village in Sepidar Rural District, in the Central District of Boyer-Ahmad County, Kohgiluyeh and Boyer-Ahmad Province, Iran. At the 2006 census, its population was 161, in 26 families.
