= Cheshmeh Qanat-e Junak =

Cheshmeh Qanat-e Junak چشمه قنات جونك
- Village
- Location within Iran
- Coordinates: 30°42′23″N 51°20′27″E
- Country: Iran
- Province: Kohgiluyeh and Boyer-Ahmad
- County: Boyer-Ahmad
- Bakhsh: Central
- Rural District: Dasht-e Rum

Population (2006)
  - Total: 75
- Time zone: UTC+3:30 (IRST)
  - Summer (DST): UTC+4:30 (IRDT)

Cheshmeh Qanat-e Junak (Persian: چشمه قنات جونك, also Romanized as Cheshmeh Qanāt-e Jūnak; also known as Cheshmeh Qanāt) is a village in Dasht-e Rum Rural District, in the Central District of Boyer-Ahmad County, Kohgiluyeh and Boyer-Ahmad Province, Iran. At the 2006 census, its population was 75, in 14 families.
