= Amirabad, Boyer-Ahmad =

Village in Kohgiluyeh and Boyer-Ahmad province, Iran

Amirabad Persian: اميراباد
- Village
- Location within Iran
- Coordinates: 30°38′16″N 51°24′51″E
- Country: Iran
- Province: Kohgiluyeh and Boyer-Ahmad
- County: Boyer-Ahmad
- District: Central
- Rural District: Dasht-e Rum
- Time zone: UTC+3:30 (IRST)

Amirabad (Persian: اميراباد) is a village in Dasht-e Rum Rural District of the Central District of Boyer-Ahmad County, Kohgiluyeh and Boyer-Ahmad province, Iran.

== History ==
In 2021, the villages of Amirabad-e Sofla and Bard-e Khiari were merged to form the village of Amirabad.
