= Nesah-ye Olya =

Nesah-ye Olya نسه عليا
- Village
- Location within Iran
- Coordinates: 30°29′18″N 51°25′15″E
- Country: Iran
- Province: Kohgiluyeh and Boyer-Ahmad
- County: Boyer-Ahmad
- Bakhsh: Central
- Rural District: Sepidar

Population (2006)
  - Total: 49
- Time zone: UTC+3:30 (IRST)
  - Summer (DST): UTC+4:30 (IRDT)

Nesah-ye Olya (Persian: نسه عليا, also Romanized as Nesah-ye ‘Olyā; also known as Neseh-ye Anjīreh and Neyseh Anjīreh) is a village in Sepidar Rural District, in the Central District of Boyer-Ahmad County, Kohgiluyeh and Boyer-Ahmad Province, Iran. At the 2006 census, its population was 49, in 8 families.
