= Mansurkhani =

Village in Kohgiluyeh and Boyer-Ahmad province, Iran

Mansurkhani Persian: منصورخاني
- Village
- Location within Iran
- Coordinates: 30°38′06″N 51°48′18″E
- Country: Iran
- Province: Kohgiluyeh and Boyer-Ahmad
- County: Boyer-Ahmad
- District: Central
- Rural District: Kakan

Population (2016)
  - Total: 390
- Time zone: UTC+3:30 (IRST)

Mansurkhani (Persian: منصورخاني) (Note: Also romanized as Manṣūrkhānī; also known as Pasduran (پاسداران)) is a village in, and the capital of, Kakan Rural District of the Central District of Boyer-Ahmad County, Kohgiluyeh and Boyer-Ahmad province, Iran. The previous capital of the rural district was the village of Abbas Ali Khani.

== Demographics ==
=== Population ===
At the time of the 2006 National Census, the village's population was 508 in 107 households. The following census in 2011 counted 474 people in 110 households. The 2016 census measured the population of the village as 390 people in 109 households. It was the most populous village in its rural district.
