= Zangavai-ye Olya =

Zangavai-ye Olya زنگواي عليا
- Village
- Location within Iran
- Coordinates: 30°53′50″N 51°04′42″E
- Country: Iran
- Province: Kohgiluyeh and Boyer-Ahmad
- County: Dana
- Bakhsh: Kabgian
- Rural District: Chenar

Population (2006)
  - Total: 38
- Time zone: UTC+3:30 (IRST)
  - Summer (DST): UTC+4:30 (IRDT)

Zangavai-ye Olya (Persian: زنگواي عليا, also Romanized as Zangavāī-ye ‘Olyā; also known as Zangavā and Zangī Vā) is a village in Chenar Rural District, Kabgian District, Dana County, Kohgiluyeh and Boyer-Ahmad Province, Iran. At the 2006 census, its population was 38, in 9 families.
