= Garkolagh =

Garkolagh or Garr-e Kalagh (Persian: گركلاغ) may refer to:

- Garkolagh Neshin
- Garr-e Kalagh Neshin-e Amirabad
