= Javanak-e Mohammad Hasan =

Javanak-e Mohammad Hasan جونك محمدحسن
- Village
- Location within Iran
- Coordinates: 30°50′18″N 51°13′24″E
- Country: Iran
- Province: Kohgiluyeh and Boyer-Ahmad
- County: Dana
- Bakhsh: Kabgian
- Rural District: Chenar

Population (2006)
  - Total: 32
- Time zone: UTC+3:30 (IRST)
  - Summer (DST): UTC+4:30 (IRDT)

Javanak-e Mohammad Hasan (Persian: جونك محمدحسن, also Romanized as Javānak-e Moḩammad Ḩasan) is a village in Chenar Rural District, Kabgian District, Dana County, Kohgiluyeh and Boyer-Ahmad Province, Iran. At the 2006 census, its population was 32, in 5 families.
