= Jahadabad-e Cheshmeh Tagi =

Jahadabad-e Cheshmeh Tagi جهادابادچشمه تاگي
- Village
- Country: Iran
- Province: Kohgiluyeh and Boyer-Ahmad
- County: Boyer-Ahmad
- Bakhsh: Central
- Rural District: Dasht-e Rum

Population (2006)
  - Total: 23
- Time zone: UTC+3:30 (IRST)
  - Summer (DST): UTC+4:30 (IRDT)

Jahadabad-e Cheshmeh Tagi (Persian: جهادابادچشمه تاگي, also Romanized as Jahādābād-e Cheshmeh Tāgī) is a village in Dasht-e Rum Rural District, in the Central District of Boyer-Ahmad County, Kohgiluyeh and Boyer-Ahmad Province, Iran. At the 2006 census, its population was 23, in 5 families.
