= Cheshmeh Chenar =

Cheshmeh Chenar (Persian: چشمه چنار) may refer to:

- Cheshmeh Chenar-e Mard Khoda
- Cheshmeh Chenar-e Yasuj
