= Lishkan =

Lishkan ليشكان
- Village
- Location within Iran
- Coordinates: 30°49′50″N 51°19′11″E
- Country: Iran
- Province: Kohgiluyeh and Boyer-Ahmad
- County: Dana
- Bakhsh: Kabgian
- Rural District: Kabgian

Population (2006)
  - Total: 141
- Time zone: UTC+3:30 (IRST)
  - Summer (DST): UTC+4:30 (IRDT)

Lishkan (Persian: ليشكان, also Romanized as Līshkān; also known as Līshgān) is a village in Kabgian Rural District, Kabgian District, Dana County, Kohgiluyeh and Boyer-Ahmad Province, in southwest Iran. At the 2006 census, its population was 141, in 27 families.
