= Dam Chenar =

Dam Chenar (Persian: دم چنار) may refer to:

- Dam Chenar-e Azizi
- Dam Chenar-e Hadiabad
