= Bagh-e Tilku-ye Chenar =

Bagh-e Tilku-ye Chenar باغ تيلكوچنار
- Village
- Location within Iran
- Coordinates: 30°50′36″N 51°12′47″E
- Country: Iran
- Province: Kohgiluyeh and Boyer-Ahmad
- County: Dana
- Bakhsh: Kabgian
- Rural District: Chenar

Population (2006)
  - Total: 147
- Time zone: UTC+3:30 (IRST)
  - Summer (DST): UTC+4:30 (IRDT)

Bagh-e Tilku-ye Chenar (Persian: باغ تيلكوچنار, also Romanized as Bāgh-e Tīlkū-ye Chenār; also known as Bāgh-e Tīkū, Bāgh-e Tīlkā, Bāgh-e Tīlkān, and Bāgh-e Tīlkū) is a village in Chenar Rural District, Kabgian District, Dana County, Kohgiluyeh and Boyer-Ahmad Province, Iran. At the 2006 census, its population was 147, in 31 families.
