= Khoshkedan-e Olya =

Khoshkedan-e Olya خشكدان عليا
- Village
- Location within Iran
- Coordinates: 30°40′26″N 51°15′27″E
- Country: Iran
- Province: Kohgiluyeh and Boyer-Ahmad
- County: Boyer-Ahmad
- Bakhsh: Central
- Rural District: Sepidar

Population (2006)
  - Total: 41
- Time zone: UTC+3:30 (IRST)
  - Summer (DST): UTC+4:30 (IRDT)

Khoshkedan-e Olya (Persian: خشكدان عليا, also Romanized as Khoshkedān-e ‘Olyā; also known as Khoshkedān) is a village in Sepidar Rural District, in the Central District of Boyer-Ahmad County, Kohgiluyeh and Boyer-Ahmad Province, Iran. At the 2006 census, its population was 41, in 7 families.
