= Cheshmeh Qanat =

Cheshmeh Qanat (Persian: چشمه قنات) may refer to:

- Cheshmeh Qanat, Boyer-Ahmad
- Cheshmeh Qanat, Dana
