= Mirghazab =

Mirghazab ميرغضب
- Village
- Location within Iran
- Coordinates: 30°42′32″N 51°22′19″E
- Country: Iran
- Province: Kohgiluyeh and Boyer-Ahmad
- County: Dana
- Bakhsh: Kabgian
- Rural District: Kabgian

Population (2006)
  - Total: 47
- Time zone: UTC+3:30 (IRST)
  - Summer (DST): UTC+4:30 (IRDT)

Mirghazab (Persian: ميرغضب, also Romanized as Mīrghaẕab) is a village in Kabgian Rural District, Kabgian District, Dana County, Kohgiluyeh and Boyer-Ahmad Province, Iran. At the 2006 census, its population was 47, in 11 families.
