= Neqareh Khaneh, Kohgiluyeh and Boyer-Ahmad =

Village in Kohgiluyeh and Boyer-Ahmad province, Iran

Neqareh Khaneh Persian: نقاره خانه
- Village
- Location within Iran
- Coordinates: 30°47′45″N 51°20′26″E
- Country: Iran
- Province: Kohgiluyeh and Boyer-Ahmad
- County: Boyer-Ahmad
- District: Kabgian
- Rural District: Kabgian

Population (2016)
  - Total: 613
- Time zone: UTC+3:30 (IRST)

Neqareh Khaneh (Persian: نقاره خانه) (Note: Also romanized as Naqāreh Khāneh and Neqāreh Khāneh) is a village in Kabgian Rural District of Kabgian District, Boyer-Ahmad County, Kohgiluyeh and Boyer-Ahmad province, Iran.

== Demographics ==
=== Population ===
At the time of the 2006 National Census, the village's population was 714 in 159 households, when it was in Dana County. The following census in 2011 counted 757 people in 200 households. The 2016 census measured the population of the village as 613 people in 163 households, by which time the district had been separated from the county to join Boyer-Ahmad County. It was the most populous village in its rural district.
