= Cheshmeh Dozdak-e Olya =

Cheshmeh Dozdak-e Olya چشمه دزدك عليا
- Village
- Location within Iran
- Coordinates: 30°51′28″N 51°13′26″E
- Country: Iran
- Province: Kohgiluyeh and Boyer-Ahmad
- County: Dana
- Bakhsh: Kabgian
- Rural District: Chenar

Population (2006)
  - Total: 55
- Time zone: UTC+3:30 (IRST)
  - Summer (DST): UTC+4:30 (IRDT)

Cheshmeh Dozdak-e Olya (Persian: چشمه دزدك عليا, also Romanized as Cheshmeh Dozdak-e 'Olyā; also known as Cheshmeh Dozdak and Cheshmeh Dozdak-e Bālā) is a village in Chenar Rural District, Kabgian District, Dana County, Kohgiluyeh and Boyer-Ahmad province, Iran. At the 2006 census, its population was 55, in 14 families.
