= Sepidar, Iran =

City in Kohgiluyeh and Boyer-Ahmad province, Iran

Sepidar Persian: سپیدار
- City
- Location within Iran
- Coordinates: 30°35′44″N 51°21′51″E
- Country: Iran
- Province: Kohgiluyeh and Boyer-Ahmad
- County: Boyer-Ahmad
- District: Sepidar

Population (2016)
  - Total: 1,503
- Time zone: UTC+3:30 (IRST)

Sepidar (Persian: سپیدار) (Note: Formerly Sefidar-e Markazi (سفيدارمركزي), also romanized as Sefīdār-e Markazī; also known as Sefīdār and Sepīdār) is a city in, and the capital of, Sepidar District of Boyer-Ahmad County, Kohgiluyeh and Boyer-Ahmad province, Iran. As a village, it was the capital of Sepidar Rural District until its capital was transferred to the village of Pazanan.

== Demographics ==
=== Population ===
At the time of the 2006 National Census, the population was 1,912 in 367 households, when it was the village of Sefidar-e Markazi in Sepidar Rural District of the Central District. The following census in 2011 counted 1,805 people in 383 households. The 2016 census measured the population of the village as 1,503 people in 373 households.

After the census, the rural district was separated from the district in the establishment of Sepidar District and the village of Sefidar-e Markazi was elevated to city status as Sepidar.
