= Cheshmeh Dozdak-e Sofla =

Cheshmeh Dozdak-e Sofla چشمه دزدك سفلي
- Village
- Location within Iran
- Coordinates: 30°51′17″N 51°13′43″E
- Country: Iran
- Province: Kohgiluyeh and Boyer-Ahmad
- County: Dana
- Bakhsh: Kabgian
- Rural District: Chenar

Population (2006)
  - Total: 133
- Time zone: UTC+3:30 (IRST)
  - Summer (DST): UTC+4:30 (IRDT)

Cheshmeh Dozdak-e Sofla (Persian: چشمه دزدك سفلي, also Romanized as Cheshmeh Dozdak-e Soflá; also known as Cheshmeh Dozdak-e Pā’īn) is a village in Chenar Rural District, Kabgian District, Dana County, Kohgiluyeh and Boyer-Ahmad province, Iran. At the 2006 census, its population was 133, in 30 families.
