= Dam Chenar-e Hadiabad =

Village in Kohgiluyeh and Boyer-Ahmad province, Iran

Dam Chenar-e Hadiabad Persian: دم چنار هادي اباد
- Village
- Location within Iran
- Coordinates: 30°50′50″N 51°13′18″E
- Country: Iran
- Province: Kohgiluyeh and Boyer-Ahmad
- County: Boyer-Ahmad
- District: Kabgian
- Rural District: Chenar

Population (2016)
  - Total: 224
- Time zone: UTC+3:30 (IRST)

Dam Chenar-e Hadiabad (Persian: دم چنارهادي اباد) (Note: Also romanized as Dam Chenār-e Hādīābād; also known as Dam Chenār Pā’īn and Dam Chenār-e Pā‘īn) is a village in, and the capital of, Chenar Rural District of Kabgian District, Boyer-Ahmad County, Kohgiluyeh and Boyer-Ahmad province, Iran.

== Demographics ==
=== Population ===
At the time of the 2006 National Census, the village's population was 301 in 61 households, when it was in Dana County. The following census in 2011 counted 262 people in 53 households. The 2016 census measured the population of the village as 224 people in 58 households, by which time the district had been separated from the county to join Boyer-Ahmad County.
