= Cheshmeh Sib-e Deli Khomsir =

Cheshmeh Sib-e Deli Khomsir چشمه سيب دلي خمسير
- Village
- Location within Iran
- Coordinates: 30°41′59″N 51°20′53″E
- Country: Iran
- Province: Kohgiluyeh and Boyer-Ahmad
- County: Dana
- Bakhsh: Kabgian
- Rural District: Kabgian

Population (2006)
  - Total: 64
- Time zone: UTC+3:30 (IRST)
  - Summer (DST): UTC+4:30 (IRDT)

Cheshmeh Sib-e Deli Khomsir (Persian: چشمه سيب دلي خمسير, also Romanized as Cheshmeh Sīb-e Delī Khomsīr; also known as Cheshmeh Sīb) is a village in Kabgian Rural District, Kabgian District, Dana County, Kohgiluyeh and Boyer-Ahmad Province, Iran. At the 2006 census, its population was 64, in 17 families.
