= Dam Chenar-e Azizi =

Dam Chenar-e Azizi دم چنارعزيزي
- Village
- Location within Iran
- Coordinates: 30°51′43″N 51°11′51″E
- Country: Iran
- Province: Kohgiluyeh and Boyer-Ahmad
- County: Dana
- Bakhsh: Kabgian
- Rural District: Chenar

Population (2006)
  - Total: 48
- Time zone: UTC+3:30 (IRST)
  - Summer (DST): UTC+4:30 (IRDT)

Dam Chenar-e Azizi (Persian: دم چنارعزيزي, also Romanized as Dam Chenār-e 'Azīzī; also known as Dam Chenār-e Qal‘eh 'Azīzī and Qal‘eh 'Azīzī) is a village in Chenar Rural District, Kabgian District, Dana County, Kohgiluyeh and Boyer-Ahmad province, Iran. At the 2006 census, its population was 48, in 11 families.
