= Sar Chenar, Kohgiluyeh and Boyer-Ahmad =

Sar Chenar سرچنار
- Village
- Location within Iran
- Coordinates: 30°52′21″N 51°07′34″E
- Country: Iran
- Province: Kohgiluyeh and Boyer-Ahmad
- County: Dana
- Bakhsh: Kabgian
- Rural District: Chenar

Population (2006)
  - Total: 62
- Time zone: UTC+3:30 (IRST)
  - Summer (DST): UTC+4:30 (IRDT)

Sar Chenar (Persian: سرچنار, also Romanized as Sar Chenār) is a village in Chenar Rural District, Kabgian District, Dana County, Kohgiluyeh and Boyer-Ahmad Province, Iran. At the 2006 census, its population was 62, in 11 families.
