= Cheshmeh Qanat-e Deli Khomsir =

Cheshmeh Qanat-e Deli Khomsir چشمه قنات دلي خمسير
- Village
- Location within Iran
- Coordinates: 30°43′51″N 51°18′26″E
- Country: Iran
- Province: Kohgiluyeh and Boyer-Ahmad
- County: Dana
- Bakhsh: Kabgian
- Rural District: Kabgian

Population (2006)
  - Total: 87
- Time zone: UTC+3:30 (IRST)
  - Summer (DST): UTC+4:30 (IRDT)

Cheshmeh Qanat-e Deli Khomsir (Persian: چشمه قنات دلي خمسير, also Romanized as Cheshmeh Qanāt-e Delī Khomsīr; also known as Cheshmeh Qanāt) is a village in Kabgian Rural District, Kabgian District, Dana County, Kohgiluyeh and Boyer-Ahmad Province, Iran. At the 2006 census, its population was 87 across 21 families.
