= Cheshmeh Chenar-e Mard Khoda =

Cheshmeh Chenar-e Mard Khoda چشمه چنارمردخدا
- Village
- Location within Iran
- Coordinates: 30°44′07″N 51°20′39″E
- Country: Iran
- Province: Kohgiluyeh and Boyer-Ahmad
- County: Dana
- Bakhsh: Kabgian
- Rural District: Kabgian

Population (2006)
  - Total: 28
- Time zone: UTC+3:30 (IRST)
  - Summer (DST): UTC+4:30 (IRDT)

Cheshmeh Chenar-e Mard Khoda (Persian: چشمه چنارمردخدا, also Romanized as Cheshmeh Chenār-e Mard Khodā; also known as Cheshmeh Chenār, Dūlchandar, and Dūlchendār) is a village in Kabgian Rural District, Kabgian District, Dana County, Kohgiluyeh and Boyer-Ahmad Province, Iran. At the 2006 census, its population was 28, in 6 families.
