= Cheshmeh-ye Sib Deli Gerdu Sofla =

Village in Kohgiluyeh and Boyer-Ahmad, Iran

Cheshmeh-ye Sib Deli Gerdu Sofla چشمه سيب دلي گردوسفلي
- Village
- Country: Iran
- Province: Kohgiluyeh and Boyer-Ahmad
- County: Boyer-Ahmad
- Bakhsh: Margown
- Rural District: Margown

Population (2006)
  - Total: 29
- Time zone: UTC+3:30 (IRST)
  - Summer (DST): UTC+4:30 (IRDT)

Cheshmeh-ye Sib Deli Gerdu Sofla (Persian: چشمه سيب دلي گردوسفلي, also Romanized as Cheshmeh-ye Sīb Delī Gerdū Soflá) is a village in Margown Rural District, Margown District, Boyer-Ahmad County, Kohgiluyeh and Boyer-Ahmad Province, Iran. At the 2006 census, its population was 29, in 6 families.
