= Chitab =

City in Kohgiluyeh and Boyer-Ahmad province, Iran

Chitab Persian: چيتاب
- City
- Location within Iran
- Coordinates: 30°47′44″N 51°19′37″E
- Country: Iran
- Province: Kohgiluyeh and Boyer-Ahmad
- County: Boyer-Ahmad
- District: Kabgian

Population (2016)
  - Total: 1,164
- Time zone: UTC+3:30 (IRST)

Chitab (Persian: چيتاب) (Note: Also romanized as Chītāb) is a city in, and the capital of, Kabgian District of Boyer-Ahmad County, Kohgiluyeh and Boyer-Ahmad province, Iran. It also serves as the administrative center for Kabgian Rural District.

== Demographics ==
=== Population ===
At the time of the 2006 national census, the city's population was 1,561 in 328 households, when it was in Kabgian Rural District of Dana County. The following census in 2011 counted 1,418 people in 353 households, by which time the village had been elevated to the status of a city. The 2016 census measured the population of the city as 1,164 people in 339 households, when the district had been separated from the county to join Boyer-Ahmad County.
