= Jahadabad-e Narak =

Jahadabad-e Narak جهادابادنارك
- Village
- Location within Iran
- Coordinates: 30°21′55″N 50°59′30″E
- Country: Iran
- Province: Kohgiluyeh and Boyer-Ahmad
- County: Gachsaran
- Bakhsh: Central
- Rural District: Emamzadeh Jafar

Population (2006)
  - Total: 159
- Time zone: UTC+3:30 (IRST)
  - Summer (DST): UTC+4:30 (IRDT)

Jahadabad-e Narak (Persian: جهادابادنارك, also Romanized as Jahādābād-e Nārak; also known as Jahādābād) is a village in Emamzadeh Jafar Rural District, in the Central District of Gachsaran County, Kohgiluyeh and Boyer-Ahmad Province, Iran. At the 2006 census, its population was 159, in 37 families.
