= Naqareh Khaneh-ye Filgah =

Naqareh Khaneh-ye Filgah نقاره خانه فيلگاه
- Village
- Location within Iran
- Coordinates: 30°40′24″N 50°30′16″E
- Country: Iran
- Province: Kohgiluyeh and Boyer-Ahmad
- County: Kohgiluyeh
- Bakhsh: Central
- Rural District: Dehdasht-e Gharbi

Population (2006)
  - Total: 23
- Time zone: UTC+3:30 (IRST)
  - Summer (DST): UTC+4:30 (IRDT)

Naqareh Khaneh-ye Filgah (Persian: نقاره خانه فيلگاه, also Romanized as Naqāreh Khāneh-ye Fīlgāh; also known as Naghāreh Khāneh) is a village in Dehdasht-e Gharbi Rural District, in the Central District of Kohgiluyeh County, Kohgiluyeh and Boyer-Ahmad Province, Iran. At the 2006 census, its population was 23, in 4 families.
