= Sarchenar, Khuzestan =

Sarchenar سرچنار
- Village
- Location within Iran
- Coordinates: 32°16′05″N 49°48′29″E
- Country: Iran
- Province: Khuzestan
- County: Andika
- Bakhsh: Chelo
- Rural District: Chelo

Population (2006)
  - Total: 109
- Time zone: UTC+3:30 (IRST)
  - Summer (DST): UTC+4:30 (IRDT)

Sarchenar (Persian: سرچنار, also Romanized as Sarchenār) is a village in Chelo Rural District, Chelo District, Andika County, Khuzestan Province, Iran. At the 2006 census, its population was 109, in 21 families.
