= Nesah Kuh Ali Chin =

Nesah Kuh Ali Chin نسه كوه علي چين
- Village
- Location within Iran
- Coordinates: 31°00′57″N 50°53′14″E
- Country: Iran
- Province: Kohgiluyeh and Boyer-Ahmad
- County: Boyer-Ahmad
- Bakhsh: Ludab
- Rural District: Chin

Population (2006)
  - Total: 46
- Time zone: UTC+3:30 (IRST)
  - Summer (DST): UTC+4:30 (IRDT)

Nesah Kuh Ali Chin (Persian: نسه كوه علي چين, also Romanized as Nesah Kūh ʿAlī Chīn; also known as Nesā’ Kūh) is a village in Chin Rural District, Ludab District, Boyer-Ahmad County, Kohgiluyeh and Boyer-Ahmad Province, Iran. At the 2006 census, its population was 46, in 8 families.
