= Jahadabad, Kerman =

Jahadabad جهاداباد
- Village
- Location within Iran
- Coordinates: 29°19′53″N 57°33′21″E
- Country: Iran
- Province: Kerman
- County: Kerman
- Bakhsh: Rayen
- Rural District: Hoseynabad-e Goruh

Population (2006)
  - Total: 27
- Time zone: UTC+3:30 (IRST)
  - Summer (DST): UTC+4:30 (IRDT)

Jahadabad (Persian: جهاداباد, also Romanized as Jahādābād) is a village in Hoseynabad-e Goruh Rural District, Rayen District, Kerman County, Kerman Province, Iran. At the 2006 census, its population was 27, in 6 families.
