= Shahrak-e Jahadabad =

Shahrak-e Jahadabad شهرك جهاداباد
- Village
- Location within Iran
- Coordinates: 28°16′33″N 53°57′26″E
- Country: Iran
- Province: Fars
- County: Larestan
- Bakhsh: Juyom
- Rural District: Juyom

Population (2006)
  - Total: 483
- Time zone: UTC+3:30 (IRST)
  - Summer (DST): UTC+4:30 (IRDT)

Shahrak-e Jahadabad (Persian: شهرك جهاداباد, also Romanized as Shahrak-e Jahādābād; also known as Jahādābād) is a village in Juyom Rural District, Juyom District, Larestan County, Fars province, Iran. At the 2006 census, its population was 483, in 101 families.
