= Nesah Kuh-e Bard =

Nesah Kuh-e Bard نسه كوه برد
- Village
- Location within Iran
- Coordinates: 30°59′53″N 50°55′29″E
- Country: Iran
- Province: Kohgiluyeh and Boyer-Ahmad
- County: Kohgiluyeh
- Bakhsh: Central
- Rural District: Dehdasht-e Gharbi

Population (2006)
  - Total: 54
- Time zone: UTC+3:30 (IRST)
  - Summer (DST): UTC+4:30 (IRDT)

Nesah Kuh-e Bard (Persian: نسه كوه برد, also Romanized as Nesāh Kūh-e Bard; also known as Nesā Kūh) is a village in Dehdasht-e Gharbi Rural District, in the Central District of Kohgiluyeh County, Kohgiluyeh and Boyer-Ahmad Province, Iran. At the 2006 census, its population was 54, in 14 families.
