= Jahadabad, Jiroft =

Jahadabad جهاداباد
- Village
- Location within Iran
- Coordinates: 29°14′24″N 57°20′39″E
- Country: Iran
- Province: Kerman
- County: Jiroft
- Bakhsh: Sarduiyeh
- Rural District: Sarduiyeh

Population (2006)
  - Total: 123
- Time zone: UTC+3:30 (IRST)
  - Summer (DST): UTC+4:30 (IRDT)

Jahadabad (Persian: جهاداباد, also Romanized as Jahādābād) is a village in Sarduiyeh Rural District, Sarduiyeh District, Jiroft County, Kerman Province, Iran. At the 2006 census, its population was 123, in 22 families.
