= Sepidar District =

District in Kohgiluyeh and Boyer-Ahmad province, Iran

Sepidar District Persian: بخش سپیدار
- District
- Location within Iran
- Coordinates: 30°39′04″N 51°15′36″E
- Country: Iran
- Province: Kohgiluyeh and Boyer-Ahmad
- County: Boyer-Ahmad
- Capital: Sepidar
- Time zone: UTC+3:30 (IRST)

Sepidar District (Persian: بخش سپیدار) is in Boyer-Ahmad County, Kohgiluyeh and Boyer-Ahmad province, Iran. Its capital is the city of Sepidar, whose population at the time of the 2016 National Census was 1,503 in 373 households.

== History ==
After the 2016 census, Sepidar Rural District was separated from the Central District in the formation of Sepidar District, and the village of Sepidar was elevated to the status of a city.

== Demographics ==
=== Administrative divisions ===
Sepidar District
Administrative Divisions
Sepidar RD
Sivaki RD
Sepidar (city)
RD = Rural District
