= Jahanabad, Dorud =

Jahanabad جهان آباد
- Village
- Location within Iran
- Coordinates: 33°34′53″N 48°56′10″E
- Country: Iran
- Province: Lorestan
- County: Dorud
- Bakhsh: Silakhor
- Rural District: Silakhor

Population (2006)
  - Total: 95
- Time zone: UTC+3:30 (IRST)
  - Summer (DST): UTC+4:30 (IRDT)

Jahanabad (Persian: جهان آباد, also Romanized as Jahānābād; also known as Zūrābād and Jahādābād) is a village in Silakhor Rural District, Silakhor District, Dorud County, Lorestan Province, Iran. At the 2006 census, its population was 95, in 22 families.
