= Kakan Rural District =

Rural district in Kohgiluyeh and Boyer-Ahmad province, Iran

Kakan Rural District Persian: دهستان كاكان
- Rural District
- Location within Iran
- Coordinates: 30°38′36″N 51°44′59″E
- Country: Iran
- Province: Kohgiluyeh and Boyer-Ahmad
- County: Boyer-Ahmad
- District: Central
- Capital: Mansurkhani

Population (2016)
  - Total: 1,708
- Time zone: UTC+3:30 (IRST)

Kakan Rural District (Persian: دهستان كاكان) is in the Central District of Boyer-Ahmad County, Kohgiluyeh and Boyer-Ahmad province, Iran. Its capital is the village of Mansurkhani. (Note: Also known as Pasduran) The previous capital of the rural district was the village of Abbas Ali Khani.

== Demographics ==
=== Population ===
At the time of the 2006 National Census, the rural district's population was 2,281 in 497 households. There were 1,975 inhabitants in 488 households at the following census of 2011. The 2016 census measured the population of the rural district as 1,708 in 502 households. The most populous of its 24 villages was Mansurkhani, with 390 people.

== History ==
The district was buried, leaving no survivors, during the 1972 Iran blizzard.
