= Chenar Rural District =

Rural district in Kohgiluyeh and Boyer-Ahmad province, Iran

Chenar Rural District Persian: دهستان چنار
- Rural District
- Location within Iran
- Coordinates: 30°52′06″N 51°08′03″E
- Country: Iran
- Province: Kohgiluyeh and Boyer-Ahmad
- County: Boyer-Ahmad
- District: Kabgian
- Capital: Dam Chenar-e Hadiabad

Population (2016)
  - Total: 1,761
- Time zone: UTC+3:30 (IRST)

Chenar Rural District (Persian: دهستان چنار) is in Kabgian District of Boyer-Ahmad County, Kohgiluyeh and Boyer-Ahmad province, Iran. Its capital is the village of Dam Chenar-e Hadiabad.

== Demographics ==
=== Population ===
At the time of the 2006 National Census, the rural district's population (as a part of Dana County) was 2,297 in 499 households. There were 1,958 inhabitants in 486 households at the following census of 2011. The 2016 census measured the population of the rural district as 1,761 in 465 households, by which time the district had been separated from the county to join Boyer-Ahmad County. The most populous of its 34 villages was Muger, with 587 people.
