= Dasht-e Rum Rural District =

Rural district in Kohgiluyeh and Boyer-Ahmad province, Iran

Dasht-e Rum Rural District Persian: دهستان دشت روم
- Rural District
- Location within Iran
- Coordinates: 30°35′04″N 51°28′49″E
- Country: Iran
- Province: Kohgiluyeh and Boyer-Ahmad
- County: Boyer-Ahmad
- District: Central
- Capital: Hoseynabad-e Olya

Population (2016)
  - Total: 10,853
- Time zone: UTC+3:30 (IRST)

Dasht-e Rum Rural District (Persian: دهستان دشت روم) is in the Central District of Boyer-Ahmad County, Kohgiluyeh and Boyer-Ahmad province, Iran. Its capital is the village of Hoseynabad-e Olya.

== Demographics ==
=== Population ===
At the time of the 2006 National Census, the rural district's population was 9,874 in 2,006 households. There were 9,803 inhabitants in 2,431 households at the following census of 2011. The 2016 census measured the population of the rural district as 10,853 in 3,082 households. The most populous of its 66 villages was Tangari, with 1,885 people.

== photos ==
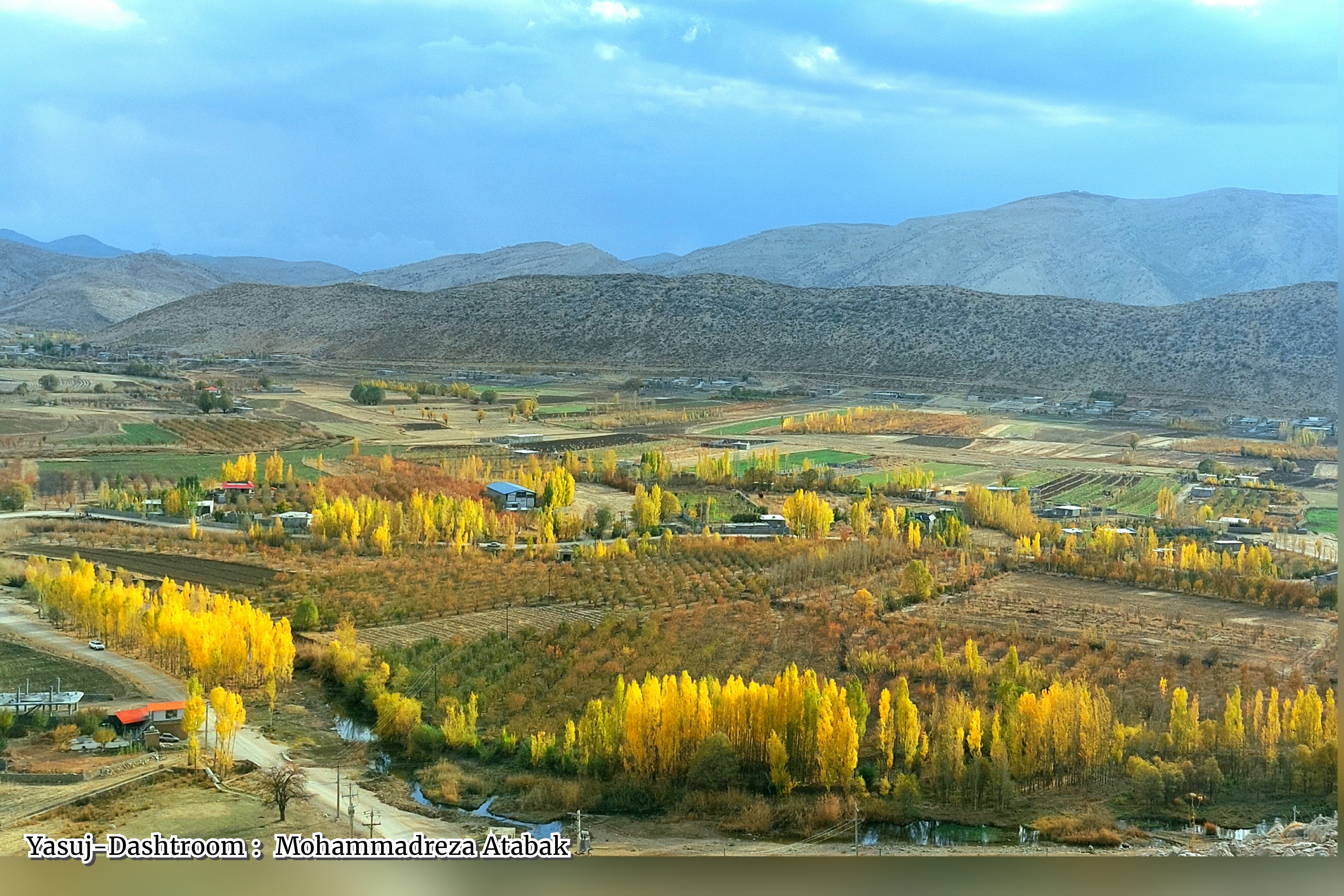
پاییزدشتروم

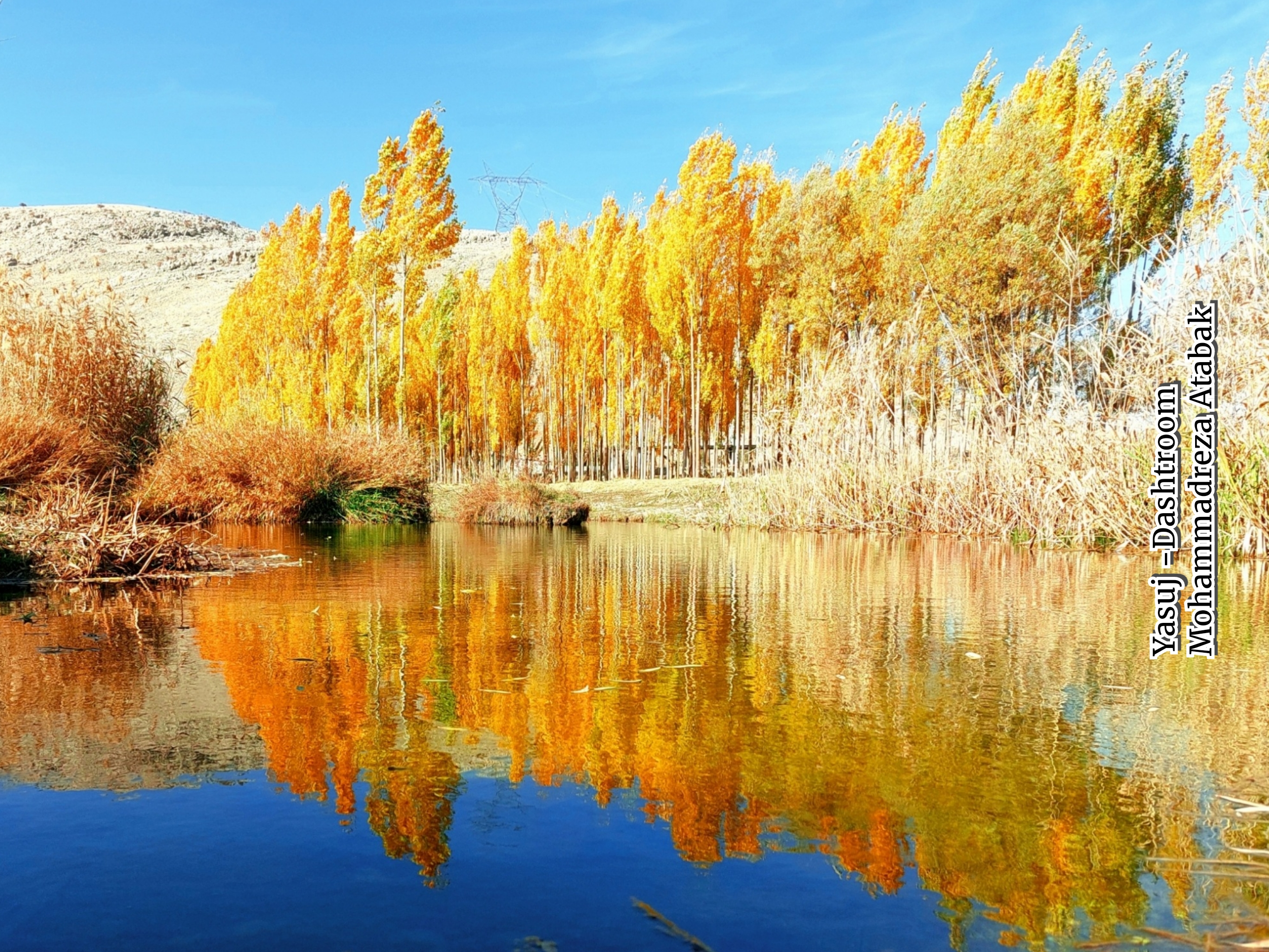
پاییز دشتروم

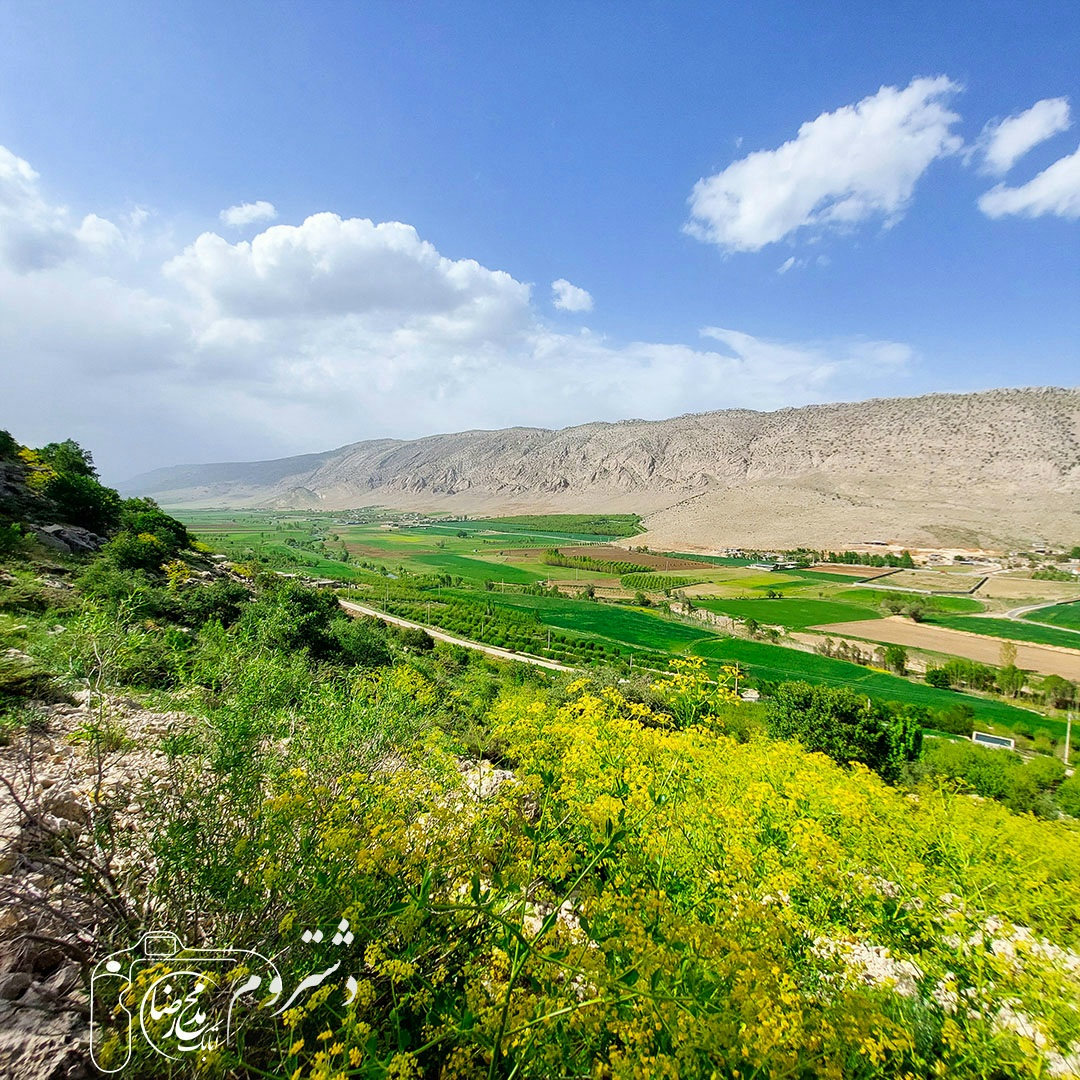
طبیعت بهاری دشتروم

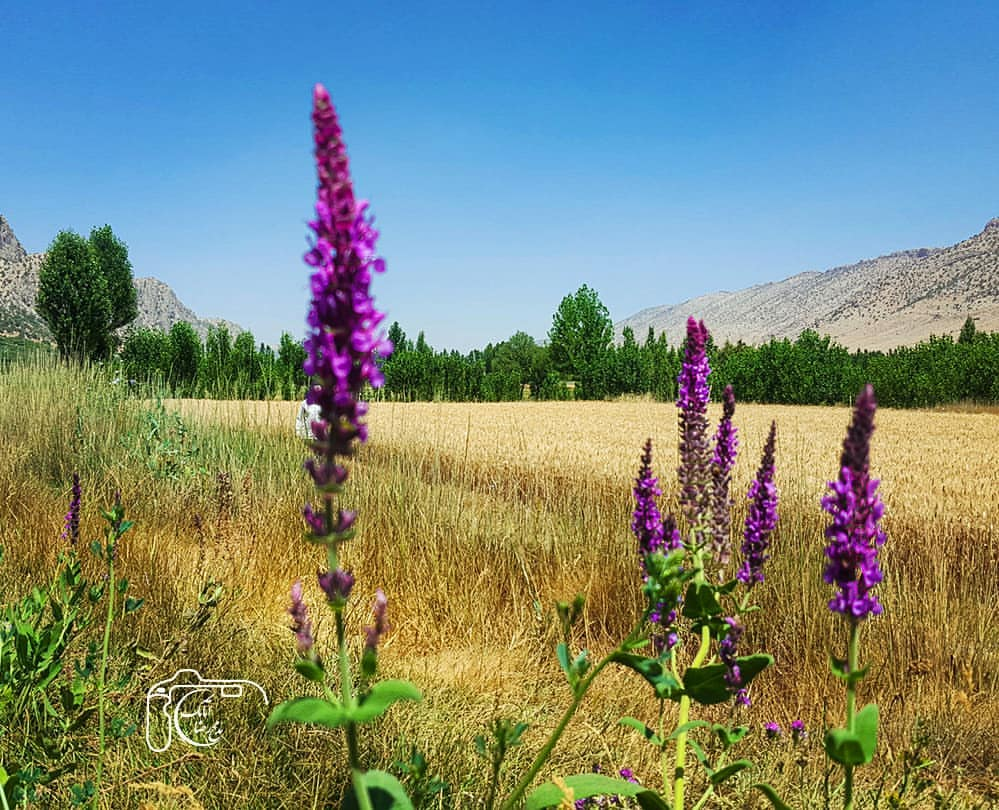
گندمزار دشتروم

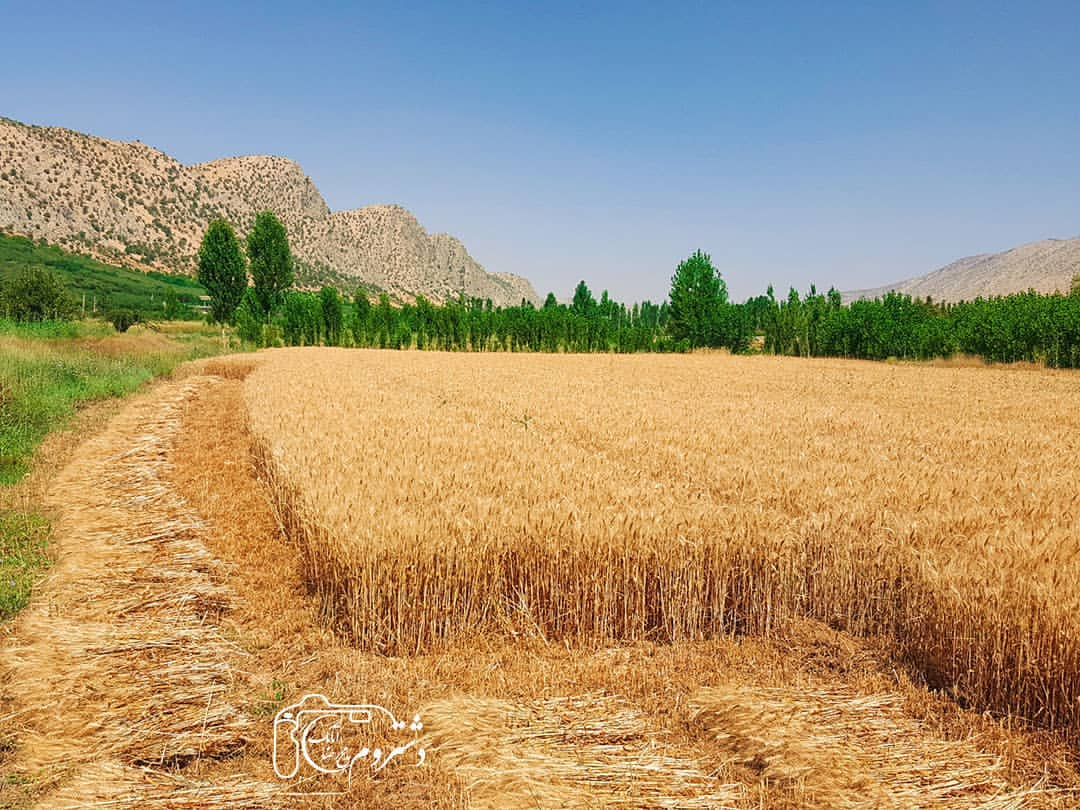
تابستان دشتروم

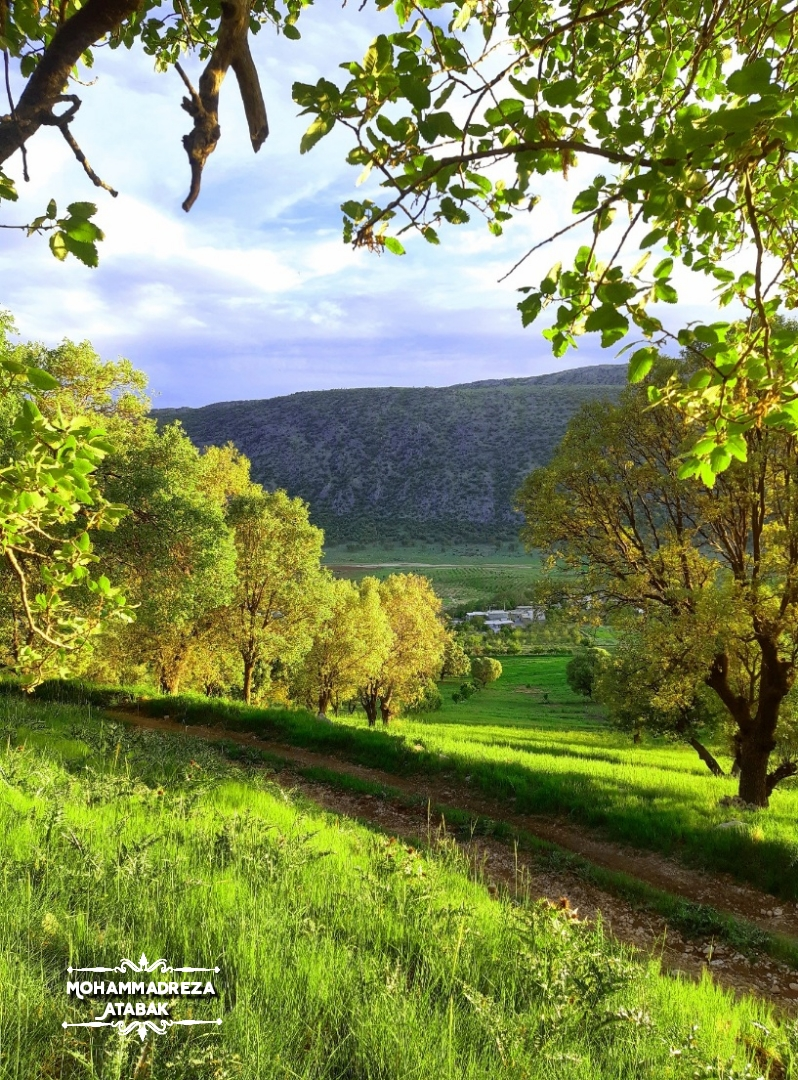
دشتروم-تاوه بادام

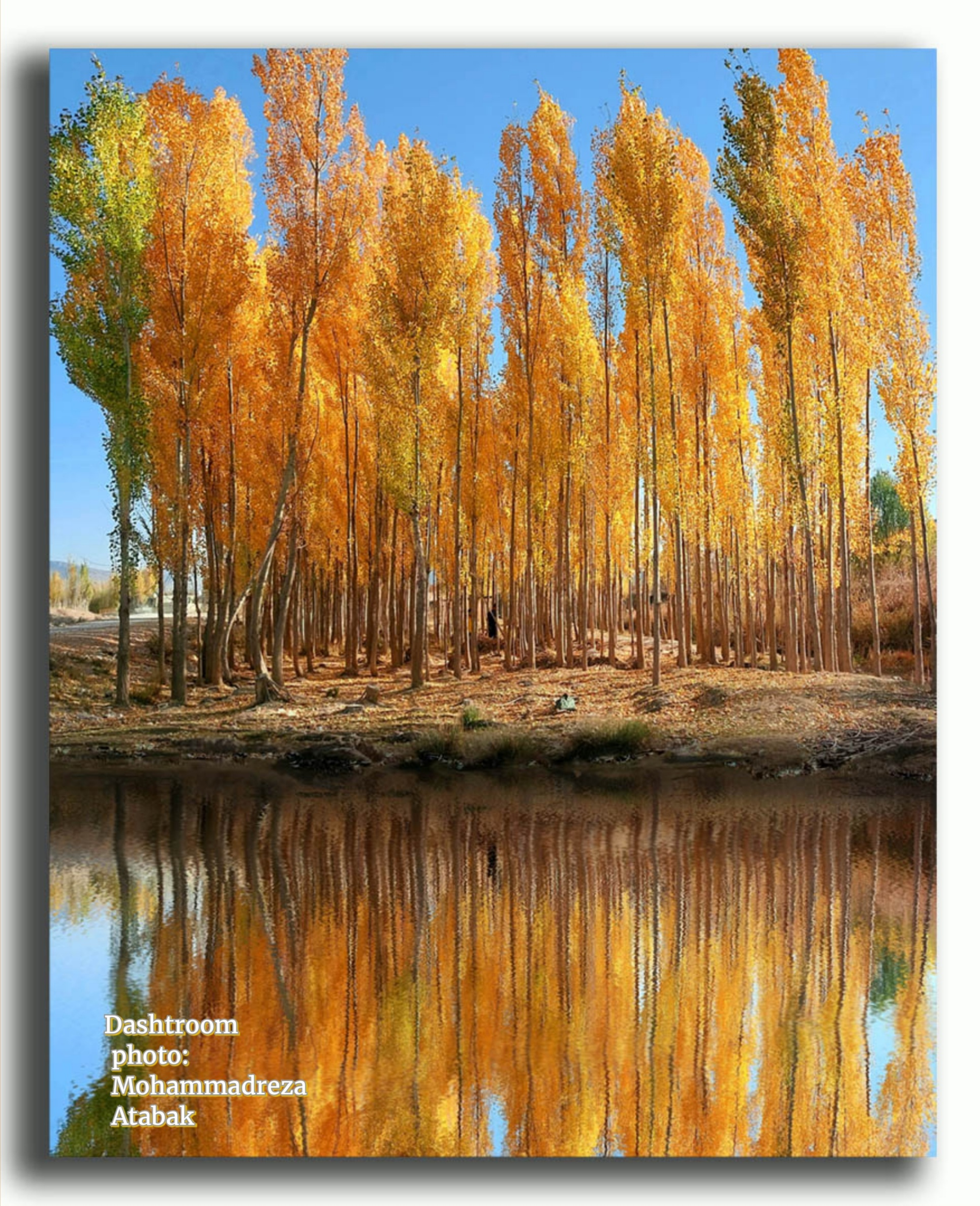
پاییز دشتروم

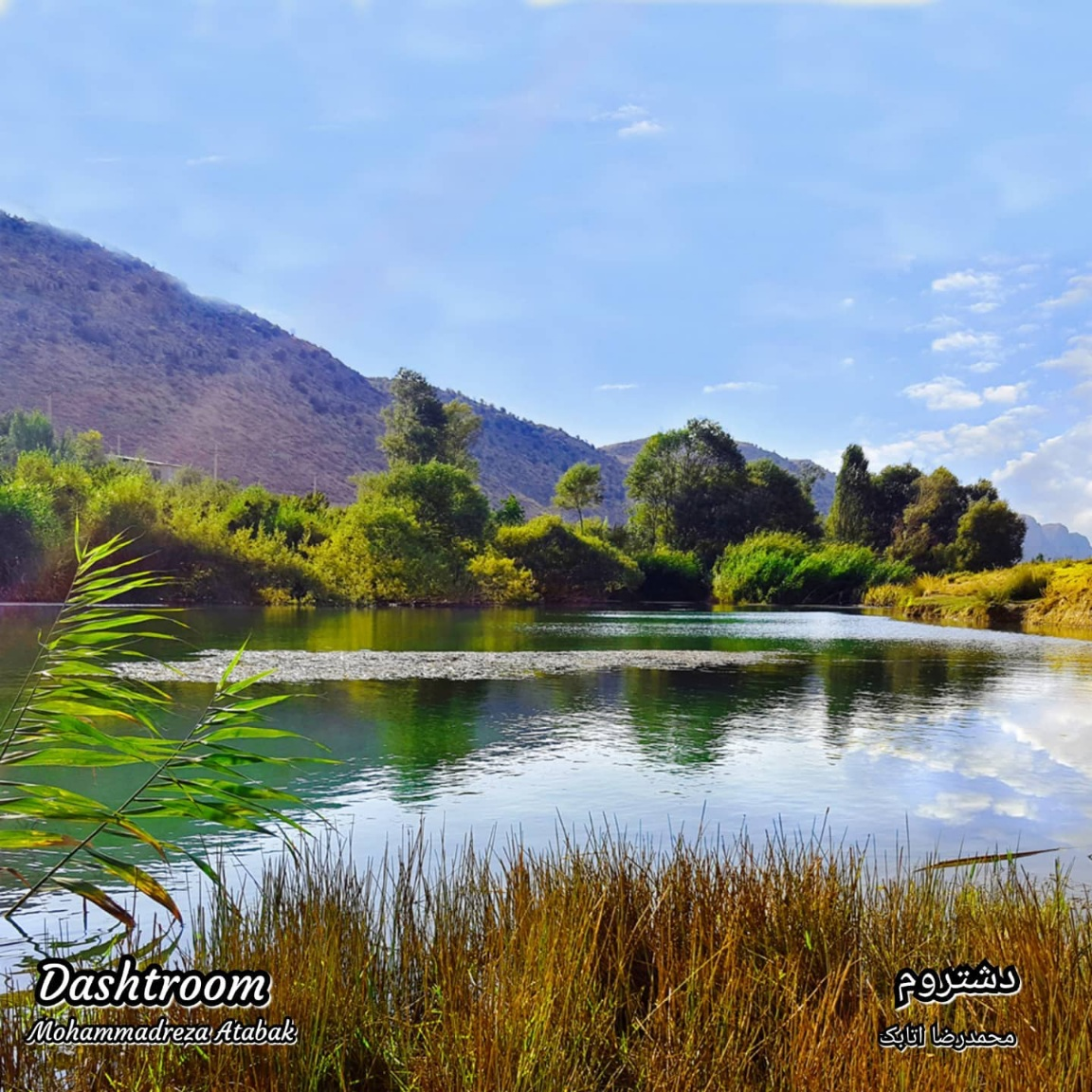
رودخانه زیبای دشتروم

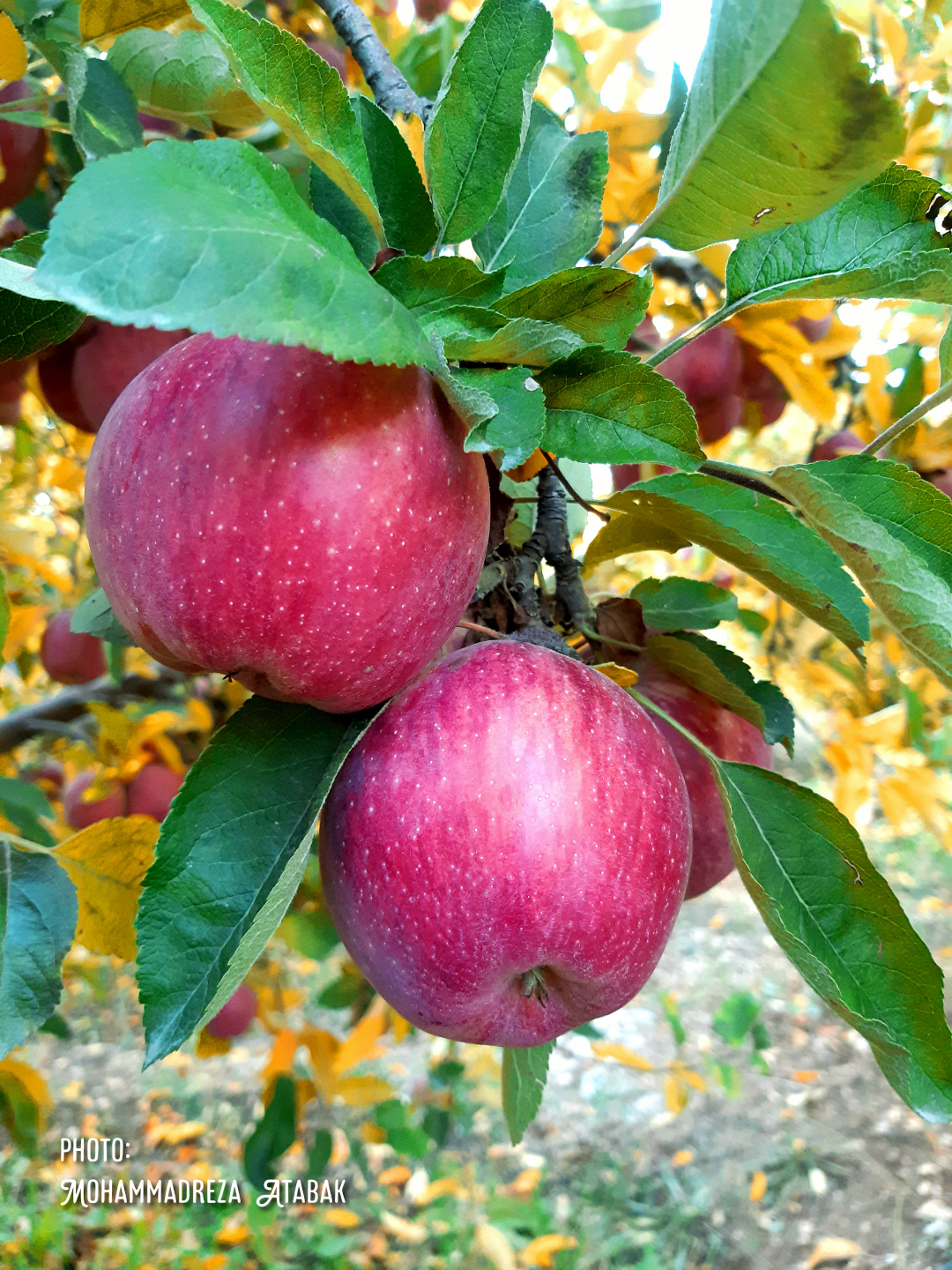
سیب دشتروم

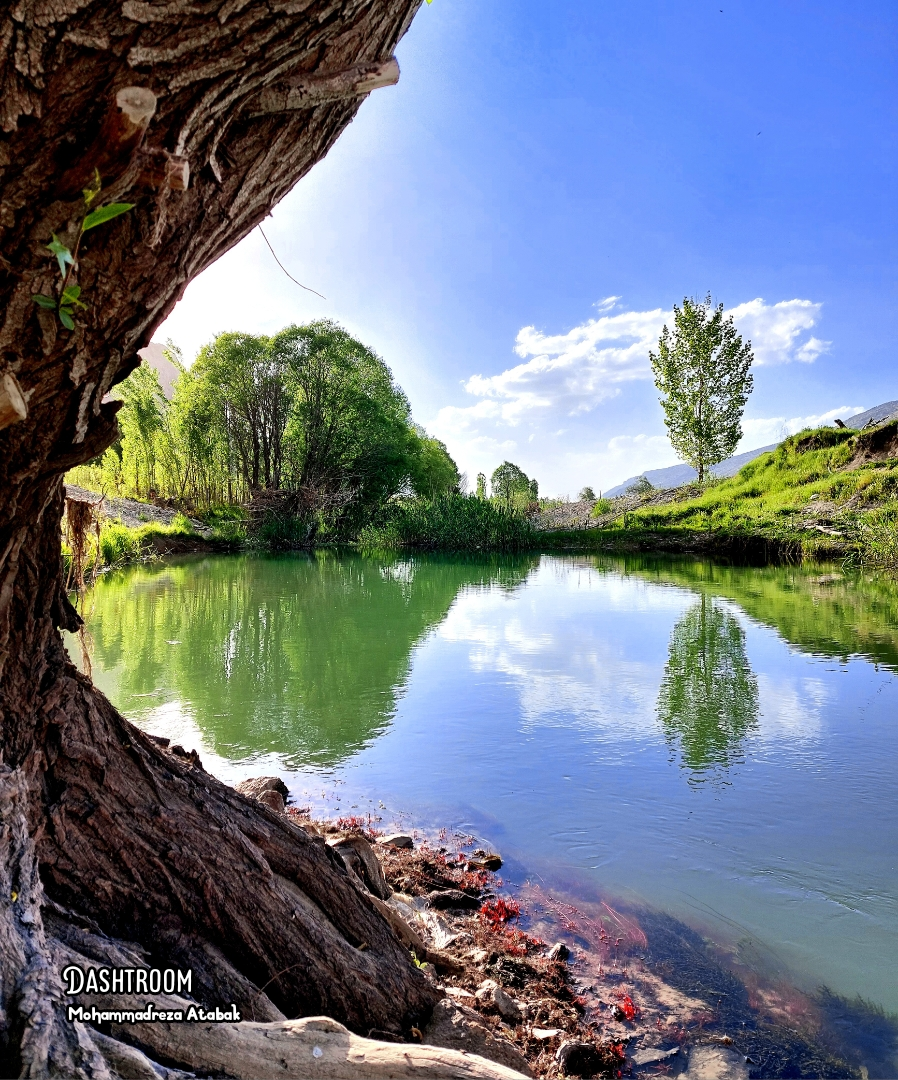
فصل بهار دشتروم

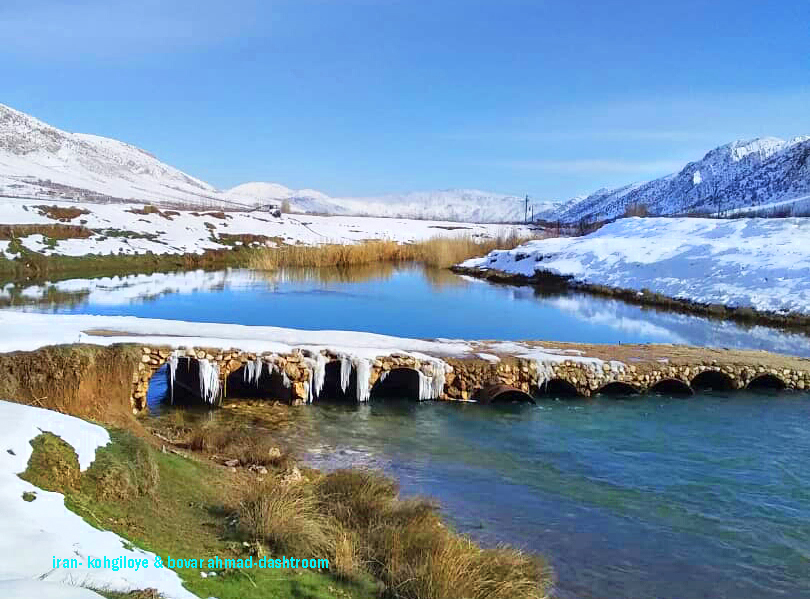
فصل زمستان دشتروم

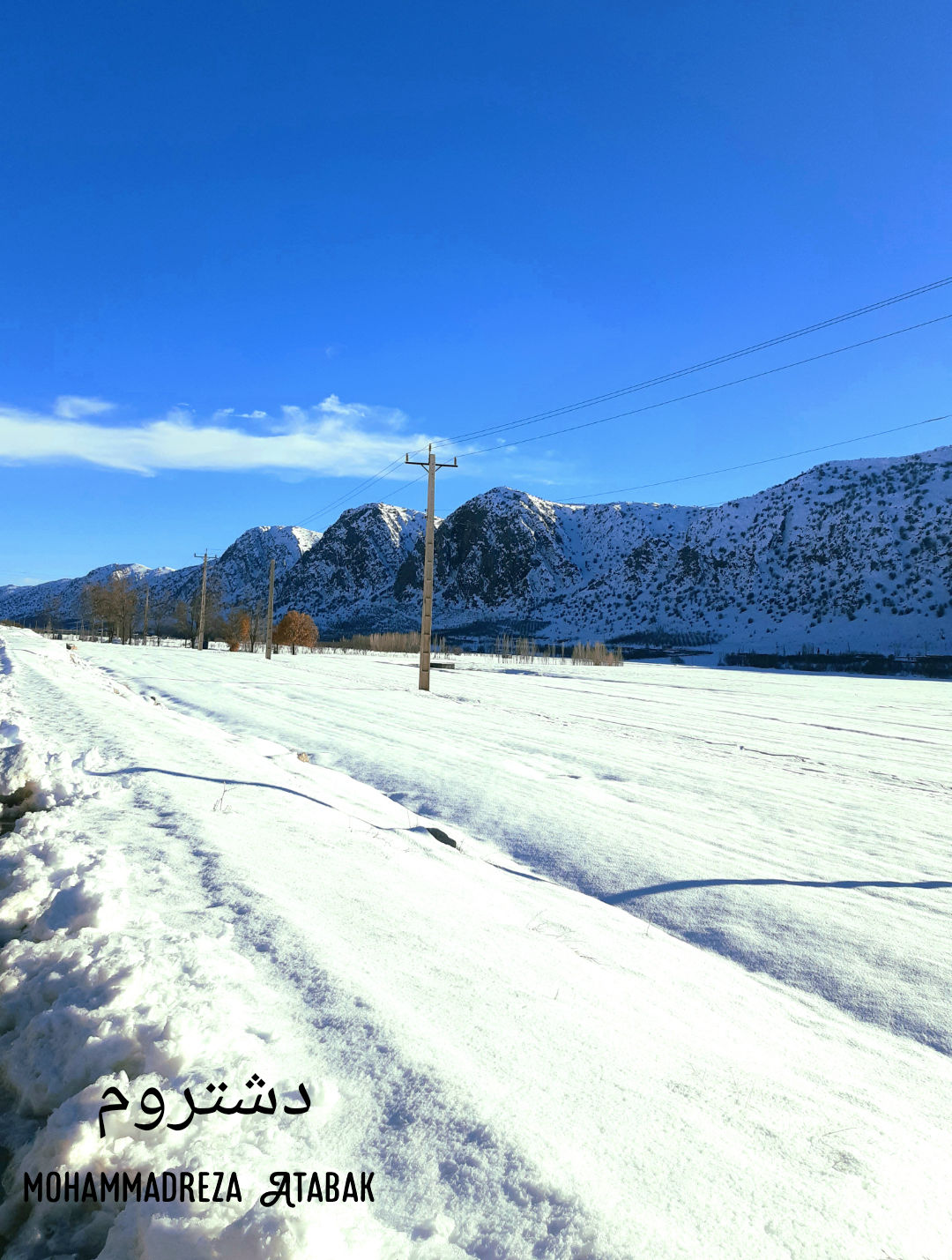
زمستان دشتروم

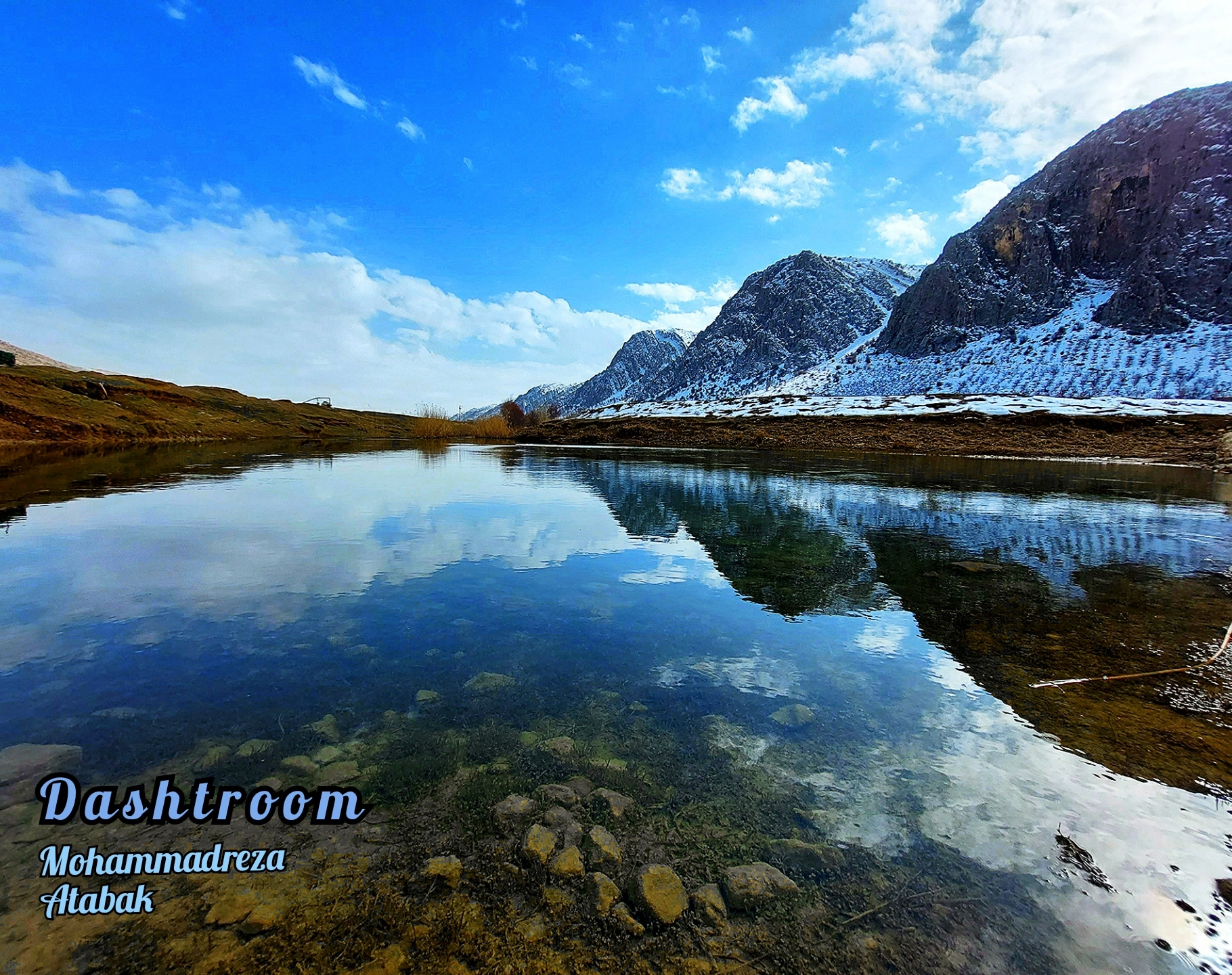
رودخانه دشتروم

== See also ==
Amirabad, (Note: Merger of two villages) a village in this rural district
