= Kabgian Rural District =

Rural district in Kohgiluyeh and Boyer-Ahmad province, Iran

Kabgian Rural District Persian: دهستان كبگيان
- Rural District
- Location within Iran
- Coordinates: 30°47′38″N 51°20′03″E
- Country: Iran
- Province: Kohgiluyeh and Boyer-Ahmad
- County: Boyer-Ahmad
- District: Kabgian
- Capital: Chitab

Population (2016)
  - Total: 4,816
- Time zone: UTC+3:30 (IRST)

Kabgian Rural District (Persian: دهستان كبگيان) is in Kabgian District of Boyer-Ahmad County, Kohgiluyeh and Boyer-Ahmad province, Iran. It is administered from the city of Chitab.

== Demographics ==
=== Population ===
At the time of the 2006 National Census, the rural district's population (as a part of Dana County) was 8,094 in 1,729 households. There were 5,599 inhabitants in 1,385 households at the following census of 2011. The 2016 census measured the population of the rural district as 4,816 in 1,368 households, by which time the district had been separated from the county to join Boyer-Ahmad County. The most populous of its 48 villages was Neqareh Khaneh, with 613 people.
