= Sepidar Rural District (Boyer-Ahmad County) =

Rural district in Kohgiluyeh and Boyer-Ahmad province, Iran

Sepidar Rural District Persian: دهستان سپيدار
- Rural District
- Location within Iran
- Coordinates: 30°33′08″N 51°24′08″E
- Country: Iran
- Province: Kohgiluyeh and Boyer-Ahmad
- County: Boyer-Ahmad
- District: Sepidar
- Capital: Pazanan

Population (2016)
  - Total: 7,803
- Time zone: UTC+3:30 (IRST)

Sepidar Rural District (Persian: دهستان سپيدار) is in Sepidar District of Boyer-Ahmad County, Kohgiluyeh and Boyer-Ahmad province, Iran. Its capital is the village of Pazanan. The previous capital of the rural district was the village of Sepidar, now a city.

== Demographics ==
=== Population ===
At the time of the 2006 National Census, the rural district's population (as a part of the Central District) was 8,494 in 1,650 households. There were 7,625 inhabitants in 1,740 households at the following census of 2011. The 2016 census measured the population of the rural district as 7,803 in 2,110 households. The most populous of its 102 villages was Sefidar-e Markazi (now the city of Sepidar), with 1,503 people.

After the census, the rural district was separated from the district in the establishment of Sepidar District.
