= Kabgian District =

District in Kohgiluyeh and Boyer-Ahmad province, Iran

Kabgian District Persian: بخش کبگیان
- District
- Location within Iran
- Coordinates: 30°48′15″N 51°14′03″E
- Country: Iran
- Province: Kohgiluyeh and Boyer-Ahmad
- County: Boyer-Ahmad
- Capital: Chitab

Population (2016)
  - Total: 7,741
- Time zone: UTC+3:30 (IRST)

Kabgian District (Persian: بخش کبگیان) is in Boyer-Ahmad County, Kohgiluyeh and Boyer-Ahmad province, Iran. Its capital is the city of Chitab.

== History ==
After the 2006 National Census, the village of Chitab was elevated to the status of a city. After the 2011 census, the district was separated from Dana County to join Boyer-Ahmad County.

== Demographics ==
=== Population ===
At the time of the 2006 census, the district's population (as a part of Dana County) was 10,391 in 2,228 households. The following census in 2011 counted 8,975 people in 2,224 households. The 2016 census measured the population of the district as 7,741 inhabitants in 2,172 households, by which time the district had been separated from the county to join Boyer-Ahmad County.

=== Administrative divisions ===
Kabgian District Population (Note: As a part of Dana County at the 2006 and 2011 censuses)
Administrative Divisions	2006	2011	2016
Chenar RD	2,297	1,958	1,761
Kabgian RD	8,094	5,599	4,816
Chitab (city)		1,418	1,164
Total	10,391	8,975	7,741
RD = Rural District
