= Central District (Boyer-Ahmad County) =

District in Kohgiluyeh and Boyer-Ahmad province, Iran

Central District (Boyer-Ahmad County) Persian: بخش مرکزی شهرستان بویراحمد
- District
- Location within Iran
- Coordinates: 30°35′38″N 51°34′18″E
- Country: Iran
- Province: Kohgiluyeh and Boyer-Ahmad
- County: Boyer-Ahmad
- Capital: Yasuj

Population (2016)
  - Total: 260,840
- Time zone: UTC+3:30 (IRST)

The Central District of Boyer-Ahmad County (Persian: بخش مرکزی شهرستان بویراحمد) is in Kohgiluyeh and Boyer-Ahmad province, Iran. Its capital is the city of Yasuj.

== History ==
After the 2006 National Census, the village of Madavan-e Olya was elevated to city status as Madavan. After the 2016 census, Madavan and several villages were merged with the city of Yasuj. Sepidar Rural District was separated from the district in the formation of Sepidar District.

== Demographics ==
=== Population ===
At the time of the 2006 census, the district's population was 174,846 in 36,163 households. The following census in 2011 counted 210,192 people in 50,756 households. The 2016 census measured the population of the district as 260,840 inhabitants in 67,531 households.

=== Administrative divisions ===
Central District (Boyer-Ahmad County) Population
Administrative Divisions	2006	2011	2016
Dasht-e Rum RD	9,874	9,803	10,853
Kakan RD	2,281	1,975	1,708
Sarrud-e Jonubi RD	31,503	44,112	53,726
Sarrud-e Shomali RD	25,908	27,395	34,140
Sepidar RD (Note: Became a part of Sepidar District after the 2016 census)	8,494	7,625	7,803
Madavan (city) (Note: Formerly the village of Madavan-e Olya; merged with Yasuj after the 2016 census)		10,777	18,078
Yasuj (city)	96,786	108,505	134,532
Total	174,846	210,192	260,840
RD = Rural District
