= Boyer-Ahmad County =

County in Kohgiluyeh and Boyer-Ahmad province, Iran

Boyer-Ahmad County Persian: شهرستان بویراحمد
- County
- Location of Boyer-Ahmad County in Kohgiluyeh and Boyer-Ahmad province (right, pink)

- Location of Kohgiluyeh and Boyer-Ahmad province in Iran
- Coordinates: 30°45′34″N 51°14′19″E
- Country: Iran
- Province: Kohgiluyeh and Boyer-Ahmad
- Capital: Yasuj
- Districts: Central, Kabgian, Ludab, Sepidar

Population (2016)
  - Total: 299,885
- Time zone: UTC+3:30 (IRST)

Boyer-Ahmad County (Persian: شهرستان بویراحمد) is in Kohgiluyeh and Boyer-Ahmad province, southwest Iran. Its capital is the city of Yasuj.

== History ==
After the 2006 National Census, the village of Madavan-e Olya was elevated to city status as Madavan. After the 2011 census, Kabgian District was separated from Dana County to join Boyer-Ahmad County.

After the 2016 census, the city of Madavan and several villages were merged with the city of Yasuj. Sepidar Rural District was separated from the Central District in the formation of Sepidar District, including the new Sivaki Rural District; and the village of Sepidar was elevated to the status of a city.

In 2019, Margown District was separated from the county in the establishment of Margown County.

== Demographics ==
=== Population ===
At the time of the 2006 census, the county's population was 212,552 in 43,490 households. The following census in 2011 counted 243,771 people in 58,281 households. The 2016 census measured the population of the county as 299,885 in 77,569 households.

=== Administrative divisions ===
Boyer-Ahmad County's population history and administrative structure over three consecutive censuses are shown in the following table.

Boyer-Ahmad County Population
Administrative Divisions	2006	2011	2016
Central District	174,846	210,192	260,840
Dasht-e Rum RD	9,874	9,803	10,853
Kakan RD	2,281	1,975	1,708
Sarrud-e Jonubi RD	31,503	44,112	53,726
Sarrud-e Shomali RD	25,908	27,395	34,140
Sepidar RD	8,494	7,625	7,803
Madavan (city) (Note: Formerly the village of Madavan-e Olya; merged with Yasuj after the 2016 census)		10,777	18,078
Yasuj (city)	96,786	108,505	134,532
Kabgian District (Note: Transferred from Dana County)			7,741
Chenar RD			1,761
Kabgian RD			4,816
Chitab (city)			1,164
Ludab District	14,687	12,587	11,295
Chin RD	4,879	4,332	3,667
Ludab RD	9,392	7,763	7,083
Garab-e Sofla (city)	416	492	545
Margown District (Note: Transferred to Margown County)	23,019	20,937	19,876
Margown RD	9,440	7,636	7,398
Zilayi RD	11,041	10,595	9,343
Margown (city)	2,538	2,706	3,135
Sepidar District (Note: Established after the 2016 census)			
Sepidar RD			
Sivaki RD			
Sepidar (city) (Note: Became a city after the 2016 census)			
Total	212,552	243,771	299,885
RD = Rural District

== See also ==
Media related to Boyer-Ahmad County at Wikimedia Commons
