= Behzad =

Behzad, or Behzaad (from Classical Persian: بهزاد Bihzād, lit. 'well-born', from به bih 'good' + زاد zād 'born'; Iranian Persian: بهزاد Behzâd; Hindi: बेहज़ाद, romanized: Bēhzād; Urdu: بہزاد, romanized: Bihzād; Tajik: Беҳзод; Turkish: Behzat; Uzbek: Behzod) is a masculine given name and a surname of Persian origin.

== Given name ==
- Behzad Abdi, Iranian composer
- Behzad Barkat, Iranian literary professor
- Behzad Behzadpour, Iranian actor and film editor
- Behzad Bolour (born 1965) editors and producers
- Behzad Dadashzadeh, Iranian footballer and manager
- Behzad Farahani (born 1945), Iranian actor and screenwriter
- Behzad Ghaedi (born 1956), Iranian boxer
- Behzad Ghafarizadeh, Iranian-Canadian cartoonist and illustrator
- Behzad Gholampour (born 1966), Iranian football and Futsal player
- Behzad Khalaj, Iranian actor
- Behzad Khodadad (born 1981), Iranian Taekwondo athlete
- Behzad Lucknavi, Pakistani poet and lyricist
- Behzad Mirkhani (born 1969), Iranian guitarist and composer
- Behzad Moezi, Imperial Iranian Air Force colonel
- Behzad Mohammadzadeh, Iranian hacker
- Behzad Nabavi (born 1941), Iranian reformist politician
- Behzad Ranjbaran (born 1955), Iranian composer
- Behzad Ravaghi, Iranian musician
- Behzad Razavi, Iranian-American professor and researcher of electrical and electronic engineering
- Behzad Vahdani, Iranian judoka

=== Behzaad ===
- Behzaad Khan (born 1981), Indian actor, director, model and physician

=== Behzat ===
- Behzat Baydar (1901–1993), Turkish sailor
- Behzat Çınar (born 1946), Turkish footballer

=== Behzod ===
- Behzod Abduraimov (born 1990), Uzbek pianist
- Behzod Hoshimov (born 1993), Uzbek economist
- Behzod Yoʻldoshev (1945–2024), Uzbek physicist
- Behzod Musaev (born 1973), Uzbek politician

== Surname ==
=== Behzad ===
- Ahmed Behzad, Bahraini politician
- Hossein Behzad (1894–1968), Iranian painter
- Hossein Taherzadeh Behzad, Iranian painter
- Kamāl ud-Dīn Behzād (died 1535), Persian painter and head of the royal ateliers in Herat and Tabriz during the late Timurid and early Safavid Persian periods
- Mahmoud Behzad (1913–2007), Iran scientist and biologist
- Mehdi Behzad (born 1936), American-Iranian mathematician

=== Behzat ===
- İsa Behzat (1875–1916), Turkish sculptor

== See also ==
- Behzadi (disambiguation)
