= Begzada =

Titles given within the Ottoman Empire

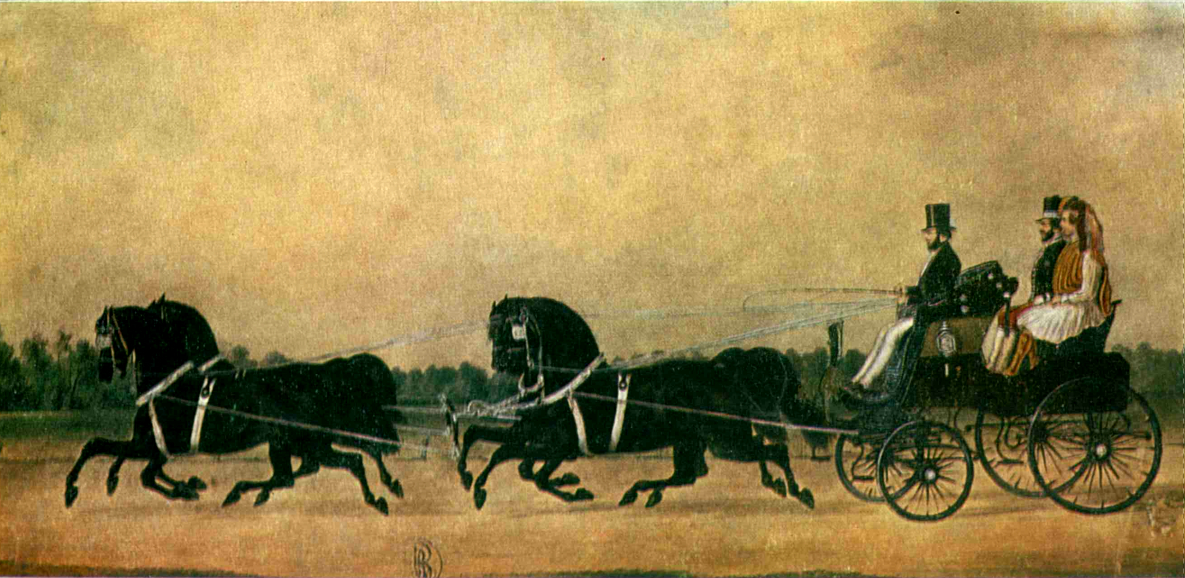
Begzade Grigore Ghica, son of the Wallachian Voivode Grigore IV Ghica, taking a drive along the Șosea in a phaeton drawn by four horses

Beyzade (Turkish), and Begzadići (Slavic), Beizadea (Romanian), Begzadi (female) Bəyzadə (Azerbaijani), Begzada (Kurdish) are titles given within the Ottoman Empire to provisional governors and military generals who are descendants of noble households and occupy important positions within the empire. The term "Beyzade" often appears in Western accounts of the Ottoman Empire as superiors within the society, usually men who held much authority. In Eastern Europe, the Balkans, the Caucasus, and some parts of Anatolia and Iraqi Kurdistan, the title of Beyzade was given to Circassian princes who led parts of the Ottoman conquest in these regions.

== Social status ==
The Begzada as a caste developed in Kurdistan among some of the chief tribes and householders such as those of the Jaffs, Khoshnaws, Feylis Berwaris and the Bayat Begzade family descendants . Begzade formed the dominant class of the tribe or household. They did not intermarry with socially inferior tribespeople; however, a member of the Begzade could be part of the caste both by kinship ties to the ruling lineage and as one of their retainers. Although regarded as Kurds, the Begzade come from an ethnically mixed background, as most of them have Circassian origins.

== See also ==
- Beg or Baig
- Behzadi
- Khanzada
- Shahzada
- Sahibzada
- Begzadići
