= Piano Concerto No. 3 (Prokofiev) =

1921 piano concerto by Sergei Prokofiev

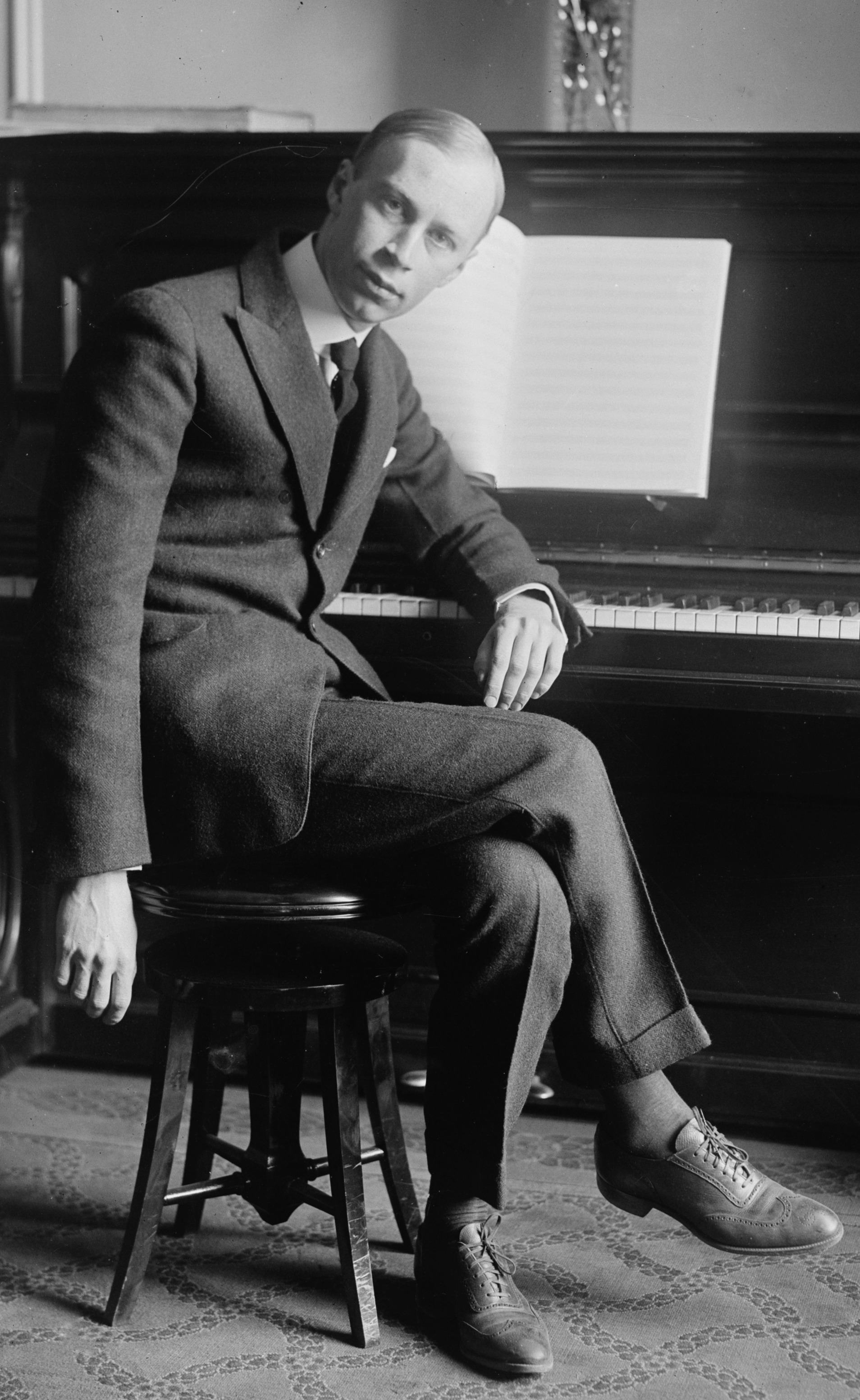
Sergei Prokofiev ca. 1918

Piano Concerto No. 3 in C major, Op. 26, is a piano concerto by Sergei Prokofiev. It was completed in 1921 using sketches first started in 1913.

== Composition and performances ==
Prokofiev began his work on the concerto as early as 1913 when he wrote a theme with variations which he then set aside. Although he revisited the sketches in 1916–17, he did not fully devote himself to the project until 1921 when he was spending the summer in Brittany.

Prokofiev himself played the solo part at the premiere on 16 December 1921 in Chicago with the Chicago Symphony Orchestra conducted by Frederick Stock. The work did not gain immediate popularity and had to wait until 1922 to be confirmed in the 20th century canon, after Serge Koussevitzky conducted a lavishly praised performance in Paris. The first Soviet performance was on 22 March 1925, by Samuil Feinberg, with the Orchestra of the Theatre of the Revolution under Konstantin Saradzhev.

== Instrumentation ==
The concerto is scored for solo piano and orchestra with the following instrumentation.

Woodwind
2 flutes (2nd doubling Piccolo)
2 oboes
2 clarinets
2 bassoons

Brass
4 horns
2 trumpets
3 trombones

Percussion
timpani
bass drum
cymbals
castanets
tambourine

Strings
violins
violas
cellos
double basses

== Analysis ==
The concerto consists of three movements of roughly equal length which last just under 30 minutes in total.

1. Andante – Allegro
2. Tema con variazioni (in E minor)
3. Allegro, ma non troppo

=== I. Andante – Allegro ===
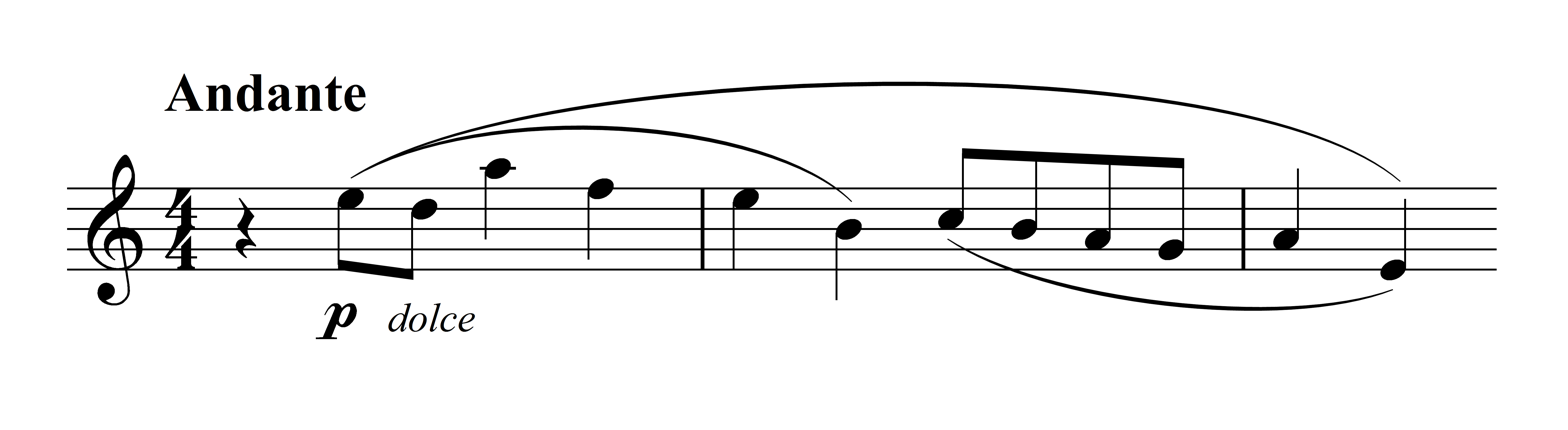
Opening melody of the first movement, as introduced by the 1st clarinet.

The first movement opens with an andante clarinet solo, a long, lyrical melody that the whole orchestra eventually picks up and expands. The strings begin the allegro section with a scalar passage which seems to accelerate towards an upwards glissando climax, at which point the allegro entry of the solo piano unexpectedly breaks the lyrical mood in an exuberant, harmonically fluid burst of brilliance and rhythm, utilizing fragments of the first theme. Piano and orchestra continue in dialogue until the piano introduces the harmonic structure for the second theme with a loud, unexpected march-like climax.

The second theme, considerably more dissonant and ambiguous in tonality, is first taken by the orchestra, then expanded upon by the soloist. This leads into what is perhaps the most recognizable pianistic feat of the first movement: several lines of octaves interspersed with close tones either above or below (in a triplet rhythm), moving up and down the keyboard with the hands usually on top of one another. This is followed by a restatement of the opening clarinet theme, played loudly in the full orchestra, which transitions to a haunting variation of the theme by the solo piano. A quick, scalar passage from the movement's beginning is now taken up by the piano, in what is arguably the most difficult passage in the first movement for its challenges of fingering and phrasing.

This leads into an exact recapitulation of the piano's entrance, which now leads into a brilliant coda involving various figurations of the octave-triplet idea, as well as runs on the piano consisting entirely of ascending parallel triads and glissandi. The second theme is restated in the high register of the piano, first as blocked chords, then as frenetic sixteenth-note arpeggios. Several non-melodic scales allow the music to wind down to a quiet throb in the orchestra on a dissonant chord, C–A♭–D. The orchestra then resumes the pulsating low Cs; the piano makes a shortened restatement of the scalar passage that led to the recapitulation, which is now used to end the movement, with a dissonant harmony followed sarcastically by barely tonal open C octaves.

=== II. Tema con variazioni ===
The middle movement (in E minor) is a theme and five variations.

- The central idea is stated by the orchestra in a gavotte.
- The first variation is a broad, slow restatement by the piano, beginning with a long trill followed by a glissando-like run up the keyboard.
- The second variation is presented by the orchestra at a galloping pace, with the piano providing excitement with long runs up and down the keyboard.
- The third variation is a heavily syncopated deconstruction of the main theme.
- The fourth variation is a dialogue between the piano and orchestra.
- The fifth variation is an "Allegro" for piano and orchestra.
- Coda. The orchestra plays the main theme in its original form and tempo (one-half that of the preceding variation), with the piano providing double-time obbligato accompaniment.
- A short andante ending hinting at an E-major ending gives the piano the last word with a low-octave E–G chord.

=== III. Allegro, ma non troppo ===
The third movement, which Prokofiev himself called an "argument" between soloist and orchestra, begins with an A-minor statement of the main theme in bassoons and pizzicato strings, interrupted by the piano's assertive entrance with a conflicting theme. Interplay between the piano and orchestra builds up steam, with a brief quickening of tempo (foreshadowing the lengthy Coda) before arriving at a slow, lyrical secondary theme (C♯ major/minor) in woodwinds. The piano offers a rather sarcastic reply, and the slow theme develops, through another Rachmaninoff-esque restatement and another ethereal exploration (the soloist running up and down the keyboard softly over gently dissonant muted woodwinds), into a united climax with piano and strings in unison, then fading into the Coda.

This is the most virtuosic section of the concerto, with an allegro restatement of the main theme, again in bassoons, but in E minor. The piano reframes it initially in D major, then slides into a bitonal obbligato against a G major underpinning in strings. Then the coda explodes into a musical battle between soloist and orchestra, with prominent piano ornamentation over the orchestra (including famously difficult double-note arpeggi, sometimes approximated by pianists with keyboard glissandos using the knuckles), eventually establishing the ending key of C major and finishing in a flourish with a fortissimo C tonic chord.

== Recordings ==
There are more than 120 commercial recordings of this popular work. Prokofiev himself made the first in June 1932 with the London Symphony Orchestra conducted by Piero Coppola at Abbey Road Studios in London; it is the only recording that exists of the composer performing one of his concertos. American pianist Gary Graffman recorded the 3rd, along with the 1st, with the Cleveland Orchestra under the baton of George Szell; Gramophone magazine said that the recording "priorit[ised] clangorous rigor over intimacy and humour." Martha Argerich famously recorded the work in 1967 with Claudio Abbado for Deutsche Grammophon; she recorded it again in 1997 with Charles Dutoit for EMI, this time winning a Grammy Award. Evgeny Kissin has made three recordings: in 1985, when he was 13 years old, with conductor Andrei Tchistiakov for the Russian export label Mezhdunarodnaya Kniga, released in the West on RCA; in 1993, live in Berlin, with Abbado for Deutsche Grammophon; and in 2008, live in London, with Vladimir Ashkenazy conducting the Philharmonia Orchestra for EMI, an effort that also garnered a Grammy Award. Abbado's final recording of this piece is with pianist Yuja Wang at the Lucerne Festival in 2009. Pianist Horacio Gutiérrez’s 1990 recording with Neeme Järvi and the Royal Concertgebouw Orchestra received acclaim upon its first release and again when reissued in 2009. But a survey of 70 recordings by International Piano Quarterly chose the 1996 live recording by Alexander Toradze with the Kirov Orchestra and Valery Gergiev as “Historically the Best On Record.” Other recordings have been made by Terence Judd, Julius Katchen, Lang Lang, Nikolai Lugansky, Van Cliburn, Mikhail Pletnev, Yefim Bronfman, Kun-Woo Paik and more recently Behzod Abduraimov.
