= Behzadi =

Behzadi (Persian: بهزادی) may refer to:

== Places ==
- Behzadi, Iran, village in Howmeh Rural District, in the Central District of Behbahan County, Khuzestan Province, Iran
- Behzadi-e Neqareh Khaneh, also known as Behzādī, village in Kabgian Rural District, Kabgian District, Dana County, Kohgiluyeh and Boyer-Ahmad Province, Iran
- Deh Now-e Behzadi, village in Borj-e Akram Rural District, in the Central District of Fahraj County, Kerman Province, Iran

== See also ==
- Homayoun Behzadi, (born 1942) Iranian footballer and coach
- Behzad (disambiguation)
