= Uzbekistan cough syrup scandal =

Scandal in Uzbekistan regarding cough syrup

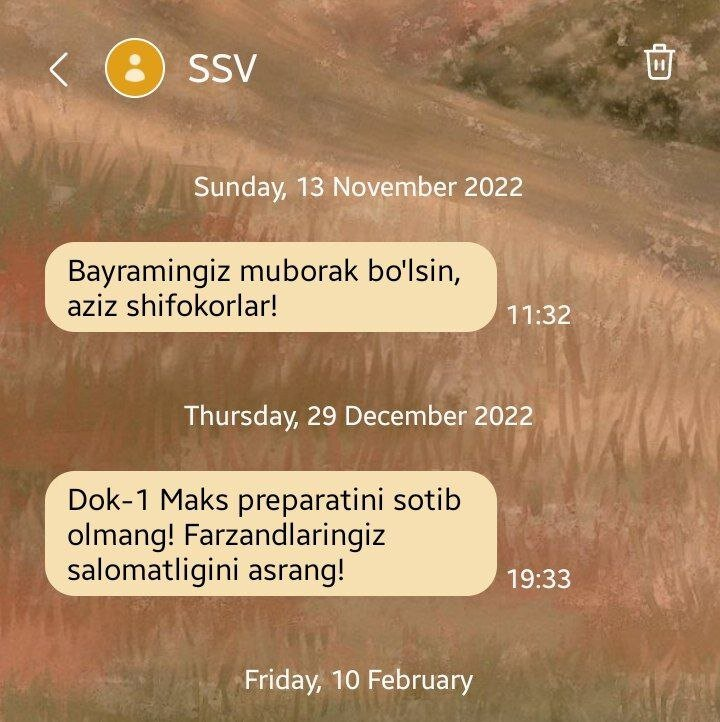
- A warning not to take Dok-1 Max tablets as issued by the Uzbekistan Ministry of Health
- Date: December 24, 2022 — January 13, 2023 (2 weeks and 6 days)
- Location: Primarily Samarkand region
- Theme: Medicine
- Deaths: 20

The Uzbekistan cough syrup scandal was a series of poisonings that resulted in the deaths of 18 children in Samarkand and two more children elsewhere in Uzbekistan in December 2022 and January 2023. It was caused by the toxic levels of diethylene glycol and ethylene glycol in cold medicines produced by the Indian company Marion Biotech, such as the Dok-1 Max brand. Subsequently, the Indian government investigated Marion Biotech's manufacturing processes, while Uzbek authorities opened a criminal case against members of the health system that had contributed to the children's deaths, such as regulatory officials and pharmacy administrators.

On December 22, the sale and distribution of Dok-1 Max was temporarily suspended in Uzbekistan, followed by the complete ban of Marion-produced cough syrups one week later. Uzbek customs officials prevented the distribution of 60,000 boxes of Dok-1 Max in response to the new regulations. In late December, the Indian government also ordered the company's manufacturing plant in Noida, Uttar Pradesh to shutdown production and on January 10, 2023, it suspended Marion's license to conduct business.

Shavkat Mirziyoyev, the current President of Uzbekistan, removed Sardor Kariyev from directing the Ministry of Health's Agency for the Development of the Pharmaceutical Network for failed regulatory oversight. The World Health Organization is continuing to investigate the poisonings.

== Background ==
Dok-1 Max is a combination drug produced in syrup and tablet forms, used to resolve symptoms of acute respiratory diseases. It is mainly used in cases of whooping cough, runny nose, wet cough, sore throat, angina, headache, body aches, and fever. Despite the packaging indicating that the syrup can be safely used for children aged 2 and over, other companies only recommend use among those over 12 years of age. Each 10 ml dose of the drug contains paracetamol (500 mg), guaifenesin (200 mg), phenylephrine hydrochloride (10 mg), and minor amounts of sorbitol, propylene glycol, sodium benzoate, citric acid monohydrate, sodium saccharin, sucralose, glycerol, caramel coloring, ice lemon flavoring, menthol, and purified water.

The drug was available in Uzbekistan from 2012 to 2022 and imported under the limited liability company Quramax Medical.

== Toxicity ==
The Uzbek Ministry of Health's toxicology studies identified substitution of the cough syrup's propylene glycol with diethylene glycol and ethylene glycol, toxic substances that can cause vomiting, seizures, syncope, acute renal failure, and cardiovascular disease. Marion Biotech allowed adultation with diethylene glycol and ethylene glycol at approximately 300 times higher than regulatory limits.

== Incidents ==
An official letter from the head of the Children's Multidisciplinary Medical Center of the Samarkand region, Mamatkul Azizov, to the head of the Health Department of the regional government, Davronbek Jumaniozov, on December 15, describes the tragic circumstances related to Dok-1 Max to have happened "in the last 2 months".

Oltinoy Esanova, the deputy head of the Syrdarya Region health department, reported that the drug had a negative effect on seven children. 3 of the patients are in the intensive care unit, and 4 have recovered. The information advised parents to refer children under 6 years of age who have received Dok-1 Max to family hospitals, even if there are no side effects.

Abduqayum Tokhtaqulov, the head of the health department of Fergana region, reported to the National News Agency that a 3-year-old boy was poisoned. In his message, he noted that the condition of the patient from the city of Kuvasoy was serious and that he was currently being treated on the basis of specially approved standards. Tokhtakulov also told parents that they should keep their children away from such drugs and not to give them to their children.

There were also reports that 9 children were poisoned in Tashkent region. According to the report of the regional administration, until now there had been no cases of death in the region due to the drug. It was reported in the media that five of the children in the region recovered, and the condition of four was stable.

Akmal Askarov, deputy minister of Karakalpakstan, told the state television channel that two children were poisoned by the Dok-1 Max and were sent to Tashkent for specialized treatment. Spokesman of the Ministry S. Ziyayev noted that the condition of the children was average, with renal toxicity being observed.

== Deaths ==
Cases of death in young children were recorded in Samarkand (18), Kashkadarya (1) and Namangan (1) regions. (Note: Daryo.uz nashri aniq.uz sayti manbasiga tayanib Toshkent shahrida ham bir nafar bola vafot etganini eʼtirof etadi. Biroq, viloyati hokimligi viloyatda o'lim holati qayd etilmaganini ta'kidlagan.)

18 children died in the children's multidisciplinary medical center located in Samarkand after taking cough syrup produced in India. Human rights representative of the Oliy Majlis, ombudsman Aliya Yunusova, representatives of the child rights protection sector and prosecutor's office conducted a special study on children who died in this hospital, showing that all of the dead children were under the age of 6, and 15 of them were children under the age of 3. The patients who died in Samarkand were from Jizzakh, Kashkadarya, Navoi and Samarkand regions.

On December 29, 2022, the number of children who died as a result of taking this drug reached 20. A child born on August 14, 2021, in Dehqonabad district of Kashkadarya region was brought to the Kashkadarya branch of the Emergency Medical Center of the Republic of Uzbekistan on December 27 under the effects of the syrup. The child died on December 28, despite the medical assistance provided.

One of the family members of the deceased child told Daryo.uz about the development of events:

People at the emergency center did not accept my nephew and said that he should be taken to the capital. While the child was being taken to Tashkent, emergency medical workers asked to bring him back. We found out that my nephew was poisoned by that drug through the results of medical examinations in Karshi. We thought it was flu symptoms. When the doctors said, "What kind of medicine have you given him, send the picture", we send the picture. Doctors said that the drug had severely damaged the child's organs such as kidneys and liver. We heard about the ban on this medicine after my nephew finished taking it. By then it was too late.

— Shahnoza Nafasova, aunt of the deceased child

Out of 43 (Note: Samarqand (21), Toshkent viloyati (9), Sirdaryo (7), Qoraqalpogʻiston (2), Toshkent shahri (1), Fargʻona (1) Namangan (1), Qashqadaryo (1) kabi hududlardan jami 43 nafar bola zaharlanganligi manbalarda taʼkidlangan.) children with acute respiratory diseases, 20 who died shortly after admission were found to have taken excessive amounts of the Dok-1 Max syrup, sometimes consisting of 2.5 to 5 ml 3-4 times a day for 2–7 days.

== Responses ==
The sale and distribution of imported cough syrup was temporarily suspended on December 22. During a briefing held on December 29, 2022, with the participation of Sevara Ubaidullayeva, the head of the Department of Maternity and Child Protection of the Ministry of Health of Uzbekistan, special recommendations were given to people who took Dok-1 Max, saying that patients who did not develop various symptoms days after taking the drug should not be alarmed. After it was disclosed that several batches of Dok-1 Max and other similar cold syrups were found to contain toxic substances, their sale was banned, but it was reported that some pharmacies were still engaged in selling such drugs. That month, 3 imported batches of the Dok-1 Max (about 60,000 boxes) were placed under strict control by officials of the State Customs Committee against in response to the health crisis.

Ministry of Health

In connection with the incident, officials of the Ministry of Health of Uzbekistan reported that they formed a special working group consisting of qualified specialists of the State Center for Expertise and Standardization of Medicines, Medical Products and Medical Equipment in order to study the negative symptoms caused by the adulterated drug. The message stated that there was a criminal motivation behind the incident, that 7 persons responsible were fired, and that the identified information was sent to the law enforcement authorities. According to the report, the medicine was bought without a doctor's prescription, independently on the recommendation of pharmacists, and was taken in an overdose. Behzod Musayev, the minister of the health department of Republic of Uzbekistan, sent a video message of condolence to the parents and relatives of 18 children who died after taking the Dok-1 Max drug. The head of the Department of Motherhood and Child Protection stated that the result of a study conducted by the special working group appointed by the Ministry showed that the condition observed in children under the influence of syrup had been obtained more than 2 months since its onset; the fact that hospital officials did not provide prompt information on the incident to the ministry on the same day further complicated the situation.

Marion Biotech Pvt. Ltd

We are sorry for the death, the government is investigating. Based on the results, we will take appropriate action. Samples have already been taken. Production of this product has been discontinued, other processes are in progress.

— Hasan Raza, legal head of Marion Biotech

World Health Organization

Since December 27, the World Health Organization (WHO) has been in contact with government officials in Uzbekistan regarding the deaths of children who died after consuming Dok-1 Max cough syrup:

We are in contact with the authorities of Uzbekistan and are busy collecting information about 18 dead children

— WHO officials.

The total number of deaths from the toxic cough syrup across three countries of the world was 300, as announced by the World Health Organization announced in a press release:

More than 300 people have died in the past 4 months from over-the-counter cough syrups with high levels of diethylene glycol (DEG) and ethylene glycol (EG).

— World Health Organization

President of Uzbekistan

Sardor Kariyev, who had been working as the director of the Agency for the Development of the Pharmaceutical Network under the Ministry of Health of Uzbekistan since February 2019, was relieved of his duties at a meeting held by the President of the Republic on December 30. The president also learned about the death of children in Samarkand. He criticized officials of the field who were connected to the situation:

The death of children in Samarkand and Kashkadarya showed the state of affairs in the field and lack of control. Today I fired Kariyev, the head of the Pharmaceutical Agency. All the officials who allowed this will be held responsible to the law!

— Shavkat Mirziyoyev

=== Criminal investigation ===
Following the scandal, the Indian government has launched an investigation against Marion Biotech. The company, who manufactured the Dok-1 Max drug, was registered as a small producer in India in 2010 and as an international exporter in 2016. Quramax Medical LLC, which imported the company's products to Uzbekistan, was registered in Uzbekistan in 2006, headed by Singh Ragvendra Pratar. The Narcotics Licensing and Control Authority of Uttar Pradesh has been entrusted with the investigation. On December 29, 2022, Marion Biotech officially stopped the production of its Dok-1 Max cough syrup, which had caused the death of more than 20 children in Uzbekistan. According to the Economic Times, the investigative commission asked the government of Uzbekistan for a report on children who died as a result of drug.

In connection with this incident, the Investigation Department of the State Security Service of Uzbekistan initiated a criminal case against the officials of Quramax Medical and Scientific Center for Standardization of Medicines under Article 186–3, Part 4, Clause "a" of the Criminal Code. Suspects were arrested. Among the 7 officials released from their positions is Mamatqul Azizov, who discovered that the syrup was dangerous and that it was this drug that caused the death of children. News began to spread that these officials may be reinstated. Kun.uz website reports that the newly appointed Minister of Health Amrillo Inoyatov held a meeting with 7 dismissed officials.

The Dok-1 Max drug exported from India to Uzbekistan was subjected to laboratory tests by Scientific Center for Standardization of Medicines LLC. However, the review was not systematic, meaning that the drugs were not thoroughly tested. State security authorities arrested two heads of Quramax Medical LLC and Scientific Center for Standardization of Medicines as suspects in connection with this case.

On December 30, 2022, the Indian government's Drug Standards Control Center and Uttar Pradesh state government's Drug Control Department inspected Marion Biotech's manufacturing plant in Noida, Uttar Pradesh. Their findings led to the immediate suspension of all pharmaceutical production at the factory, affecting Marion products beyond the cough syrups attributed to the deaths.

On January 2, 2023, the sale of all drugs imported by Quramax Medical that were found to contain ethylene glycol and diethylene glycol was stopped. On January 10, the Indian government suspended the license of Marion Biotech, the manufacturer of Dok-1 Max. On January 13, the license of Quramax Medical LLC was revoked by a decision of the Tashkent Interdistrict Economic Court.

According to an article from June 2023, sources at Maya Chemtech India told Reuters that Marion purchased industrial-grade propylene glycol as an ingredient from them. Maya is not licensed to sell pharmaceutical-grade materials. It is not facing charges but the investigation is ongoing. Marion did not test the ingredient it purchased.

In October 2023, the Uttar Pradesh state government accepted Marion Biotech's appeal to resume production of medicines that do not contain propylene glycol, as such products would be unlikely to contain the toxic impurities of diethylene glycol and ethylene glycol.

== See also ==
- Toxic cough syrup
