= Mohammadzadeh =

Mohammadzadeh or Mohammedzadeh (Persian: محمدزاده) is a surname. Notable people with the surname include:

- Behzad Mohammadzadeh, Iranian hacker
- Karim Mohammedzadeh, Iranian dissident
- Mehdi Mohammadzadeh (born 1984), Iranian football coach and former player
- Navid Mohammadzadeh, Iranian actor
- Saber Mohammadzadeh, Iranian communist
- Sahand Noor Mohammadzadeh, Iranian bodybuilder
- Vahid Mohammadzadeh (born 1989), Iranian football centre-back

== See also ==
- Khalil Rashid-Mohammadzadeh (born 1953), Iranian Greco-Roman wrestler
