= Mental health in Uzbekistan =

Mental health was declared a priority for public health by the Uzbekistani government in November 1998.

Mental health in Uzbekistan encompasses the prevalence, social and economic burden, and treatment of mental health disorders in Uzbekistan. A 2021 World Health Organization (WHO) report stated that no studies had been conducted on the prevalence of mental health disorders in Uzbekistan. Nevertheless, mental illness has significant social and economic effects in Uzbekistan.

== Epidemiology ==
According to a 2021 report by WHO, no studies had been conducted on the prevalence of mental illness in Uzbekistan. The only figures available were the number of people treated for or registered with a mental disorder.

== Treatment ==
In Uzbekistan, psychiatric treatment is provided by the public sector. Furthermore, psychiatric medications are available to people diagnosed with a mental disorder either free of charge or subsidised at 80% by the government.

According to a 2019 report by the Ministry of Public Health,

- 48.5% of patients admitted into psychiatric care were diagnosed with schizophrenic disorder.
- 20% of patients were admitted for an intellectual disability.
- Common mental disorders such as depression and anxiety accounted for less than 10% of admissions into psychiatric hospitals.

== Youth mental health ==
=== 2022 UNICEF study ===
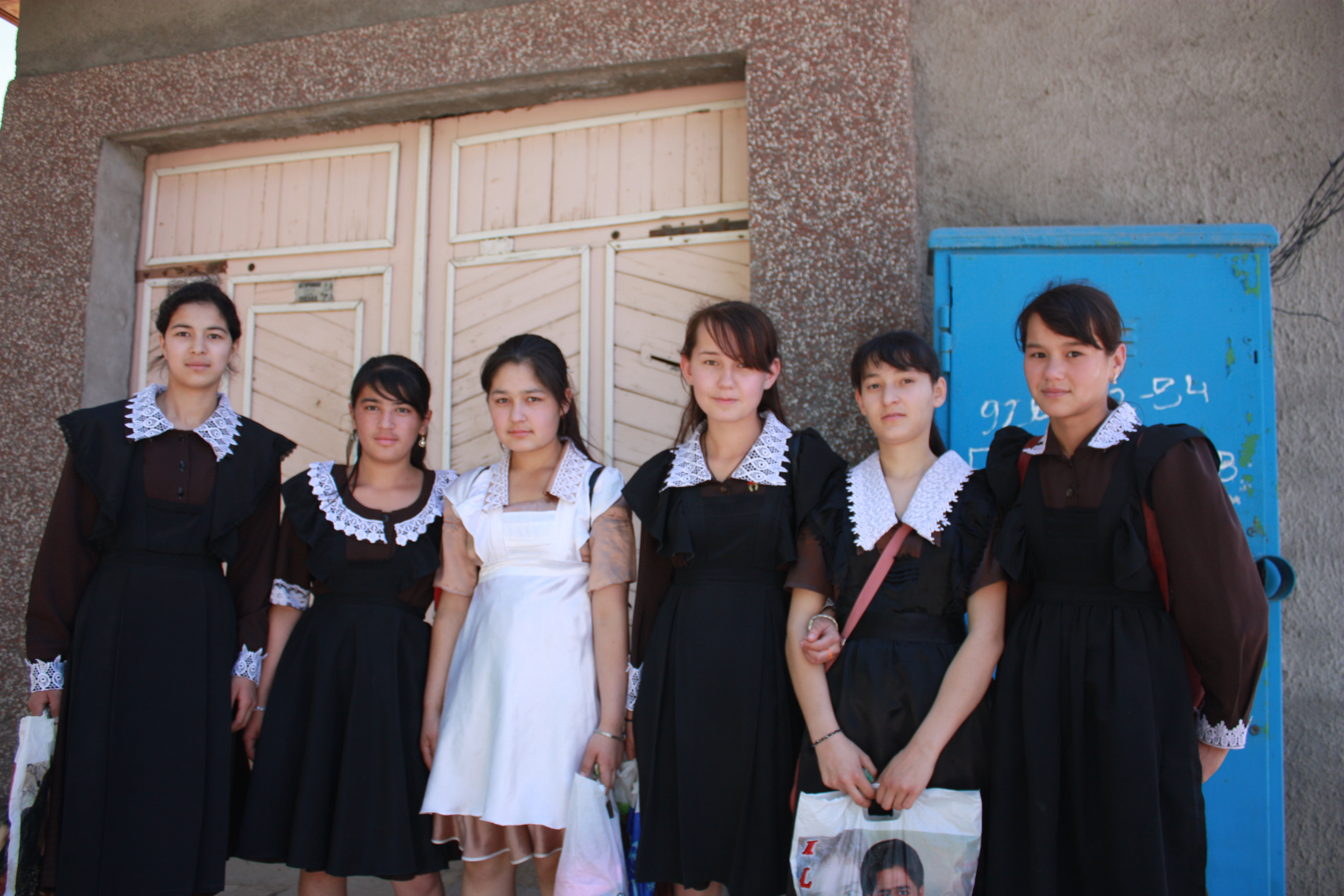

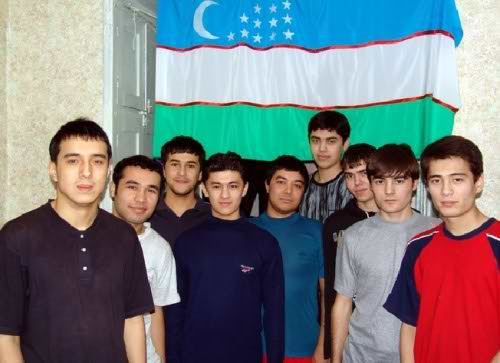
In 2022, approximately 1 in 10 Uzbekistani students met the threshold for either depression or anxiety, in the moderate to severe range.

In 2022, a study was conducted by UNICEF, in collaboration with the Ministry of Public Education and the Ministry of Health. The study involved administering a questionnaire to 22,854 students across 299 schools, who were in 6th, 9th and 11th grades.

==== Loneliness ====
- 8.7% of students didn't feel a sense of belonging at their school
- 16.7% of students felt lonely in their classroom.

==== Mental health disorders ====
- 15.4% of students met the diagnostic threshold for moderate to severe anxiety.
- 9.8% of students met the diagnostic threshold for moderate to severe depression.
- Girls were slightly more likely than boys to experience moderate to severe anxiety or depression.

==== Suicide and self harm ====
In 2022, the suicide rate among adolescents was found to have doubled among boys and tripled among girls, compared to 2008.

== Economic impact ==
=== Direct costs ===
In 2020, the Uzbek government spent UZS 820 496 million (US$84.6 million) on mental health services.

=== Indirect economic losses ===
The indirect economic losses due to mental illness is calculated as the sum of losses due to absenteeism, presenteeism and premature death. In 2019, the total economic losses due to absenteeism and presenteeism was UZS 3.5 trillion (US$359 million).
