= Abduraimov =

Abduraimov (masculine) or Abduraimova (feminine) is a surname. Notable people with the surname include:

- Azamat Abduraimov (born 1966), Uzbekistani footballer
- Behzod Abduraimov (born 1990), Uzbekistani pianist
- Berador Abduraimov (born 1943), Soviet footballer and manager
- Nigina Abduraimova (born 1994), Uzbekistani tennis player
