= Hoshimov =

Hoshimov (feminine: Hoshimova) is an Uzbek surname. Notable people with the surname include:

== Masculine ==
- Behzod Hoshimov (born 1993), Uzbek economist
- Oʻtkir Hoshimov (1941–2013), Uzbek writer

== Feminine ==
- Maiden last name of Ziroat Mirziyoyeva (born 1964), First Lady of Uzbekistan, who is also referred to as Ziroat Hoshimova
