= Behzad (disambiguation) =

Behzad is a masculine given name and a surname of Persian origin.

Behzad may also refer to:

== Villages in Iran ==
- Bagh-e Behzad, a village in Javanmardi Rural District, Khanmirza District, Lordegan County, Chaharmahal and Bakhtiari Province
- Behzad Kola, a village in Qareh Toghan Rural District, Central District, Neka County, Mazandaran Province
- Darreh-ye Behzad, a village in Darreh Kayad Rural District, Sardasht District, Dezful County, Khuzestan Province
- Hajji Behzad, a village in Zarrineh Rud-e Shomali Rural District, Central District, Miandoab County, West Azerbaijan Province

== Other uses ==
- Behzad's brush-tailed mouse, species of hamster
- Behzad Cinema, movie cinema in Kabul, Afgahnistan
