= Inoyatov =

Inoyatov is an Uzbek surname. Notable people with the surname include:

- Amrillo Inoyatov (born 1979), Uzbek government official
- Murad Inoyatov (born 1984), Uzbek tennis player
- Rustam Inoyatov (born 1944), Uzbek government official
