= Behzod Musaev =

Uzbek politician

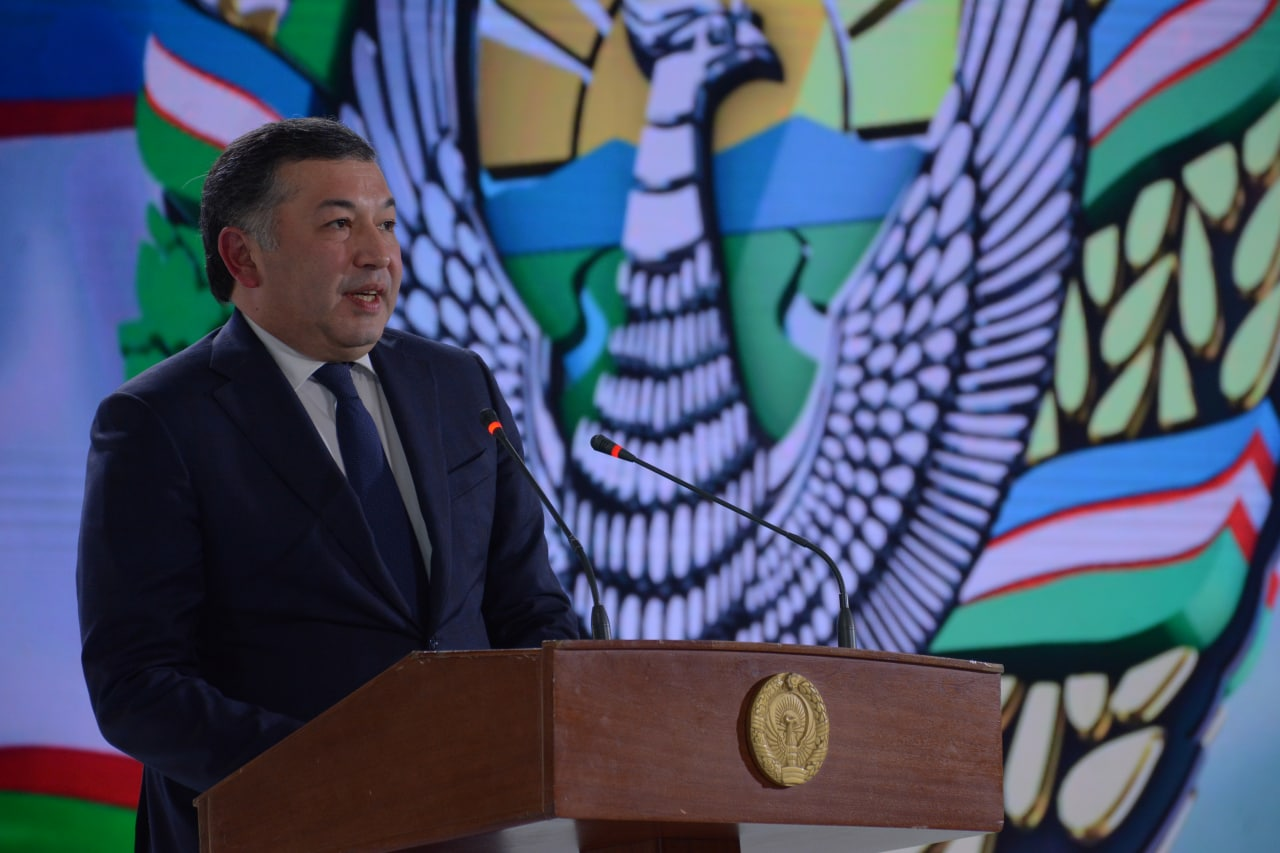

Minister of Health of Uzbekistan
- Incumbent
- Assumed office November 2021
- President: Shavkat Mirziyoyev
- Deputy: Amrillo Inoyatov
- Preceded by: Alisher Shodmonov

Personal details
- Born: 1973 (age 52–53) Tashkent, Uzbek SSR, Soviet Union
- Education: Tashkent State University of Economics

Behzod Musaev (uzb: Behzod Anvarovich Musaev; cyrillic: Мусаев, Бехзод Анварович born in 1973, Tashkent, Uzbek SSR, USSR) is an Uzbek economist and statesman, from May 2018 to May 2020 he served as chairman of the State Tax Committee of Uzbekistan, from May 14, 2020 to 11 November 2021 Prime Minister of the Republic of Uzbekistan for Development. Since November 11, 2021, the Minister of Health of Uzbekistan.

== Biography ==
Behzod Musaev was born in 1973 in Tashkent. In 1995 he graduated from the Tashkent State Economic University with a degree in economics. In 2004 he graduated from the Higher School of Business under the Academy of State and Public Construction under the President of the Republic of Uzbekistan.

He began his career in 1995 at the National Bank of Uzbekistan. From 1998 to 2002, he worked at the Ministry of Finance, where he worked his way up from the head of a department to the head of the main department. In the Ministry of Finance, he exercised control over the government securities market, and then over the financing of scientific and social institutions.

In 2002, he moved to work in the Accounts Chamber. From 2006 to 2010, he served as chairman of the Accounts Chamber.

In 2010, he began his career at the State Tax Committee of Uzbekistan (STC). From 2010 to 2011, he worked as the first deputy chairman of the State Tax Committee, was reappointed to this position in March 2018, and since May of the same year as the head of the State Tax Committee.

On May 14, 2020, by decree of the President of the Republic of Uzbekistan, Shavkat Mirziyoyev appointed him Deputy Prime Minister of Uzbekistan for Social Development.

From July 30, 2020, Musaev also simultaneously acted as head of the Ministry of Health of Uzbekistan, since the current minister, Alisher Shadmanov, was on treatment. On November 11, 2021, the President of Uzbekistan signed a decree appointing Musaev as the Minister of Health of Uzbekistan.

== See also ==
- Government of Uzbekistan
- Ministry of Public Health (Uzbekistan)
