= Behzad Ghafarizadeh =

Iranian cartoonist and illustrator (born 1983)

Behzad Ghafarizadeh بهزاد غفاری زاده
- Born: Tehran, Iran
- Area: Cartoonist
- Pseudonym: Behzad

Behzad Ghafarizadeh (Persian: بهزاد غفاری‌زاده), is an Iranian - Canadian cartoonist and illustrator. He was born in 1983 in Tehran, and grew up in an art-centered family. He graduated from the University of Tehran and received his master's degree in materials engineering. He continued his PhD in Mechanical Engineering at École de technologie supérieure, Université du Québec, in Montreal, Quebec.

In 2006, Ghafarizadeh's first individual cartoon exhibition was held in the "Iranian House of Cartoon" in Tehran. His works have been exhibited in international cartoon exhibitions and published in many cartoon books. His cartoons have also received awards in many important cartoon competitions, such as the Global Editorial Cartoon Competition (2012), Diogenes, Taborda festival (2009), Medplan (2014), etc. Musée des maîtres et artisans du Québec held an exhibition of the cartoons and illustrations of Behzad Ghafarizadeh and Oleg Dergachov with the title of Artoon (Art+Cartoon) in 2015 for one month (from 8 Jan to 8 Feb 2015).

== Education ==
- PhD in mechanical engineering from University of Quebec-École de Technologie Supérieure (ÉTS- Université du Québec), Montreal, Quebec, Canada
- Master of Science in materials engineering from University of Tehran, Iran
- Bachelor of Science in materials engineering from Chamran University, Iran

== Awards ==
- Honorable Mention of the 44th Piracicaba International Humor Salon 2017, Brazil
- Honorable Mention of the Just For Laughs 2015 International Visual Arts Contest, Montreal, Canada 2015
- First prize of the 23rd University Humor Exhibition of Piracicaba (UNIMEP), Brazil, 2015
- The second Best Foreign Cartoon in Maya Kamath cartoon award, India, 2015
- Honorable Mention of 6th Salão Medplan de Humor, Brazil 2014
- Second prize, visual art competition ArtMTL, Un artiste, Une œuvre, Montreal, Quebec, Canada 2014
- Second prize, International Cartoon Contest of Spirito di Vin, Italy 2013
- Winner, 2012 Global Editorial Cartoon Competition, CIPE, United States 2012.
- Winner, Color Graphic Humor at the 14th Edition of the Salon Diogenes Taborda Festival, Argentina 2009
- Winner, 1st International Cartoonet - Street Children, Iran 2008
- Selected prize of 5th Free CartoonsWeb International Cartoon Festival, China

== Exhibitions ==
- Toons Mag International Cartoon Contest, Women's Rights, India, 2016
- Cartoon exhibition (ARToon) in "Musée des Maîtres et Artisans du Québec " with Oleg Dergachov, Montreal, Quebec, Canada, 2015
- Exhibition of the 23rd University Humor Exhibition of Piracicaba, Brazil, 2015 (Group Exhibition)
- Exhibition of the XXIII International Design for Press, Portugal, 2015 (Group Exhibition)
- ArtMTL, Un artiste, Une œuvre, Montreal, Quebec, Canada, 2014 (Group Exhibition)
- 8 March Women's Rights Day Cartoon Exhibition, Antalya, Türkiye, 2013 (Group Exhibition)
- Individual cartoon exhibition in "Iranian House of Cartoon", Tehran, Iran, 2006
