= Valery Gergiev =

Russian conductor (born 1953)

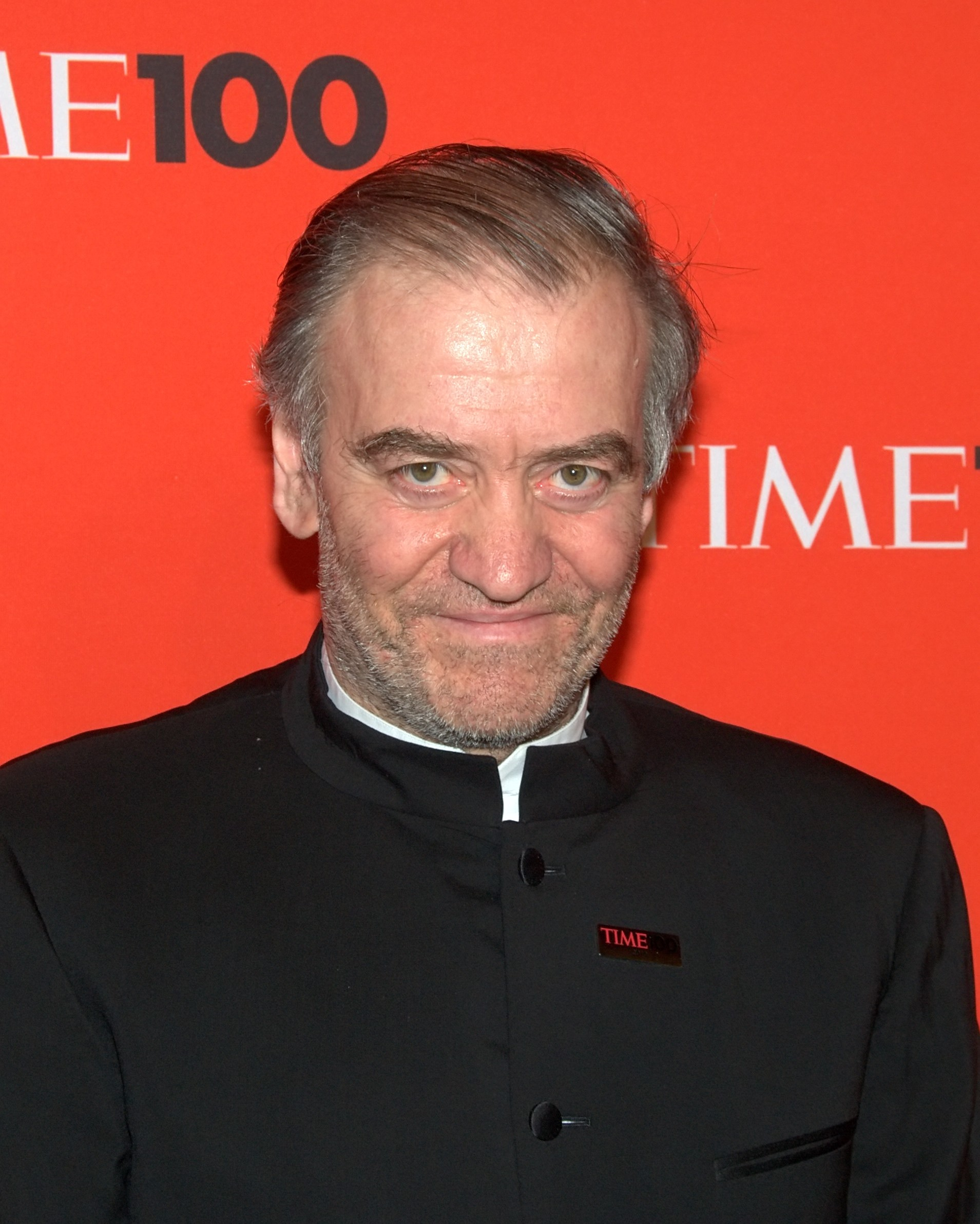
Gergiev at the 2010 Time 100 Gala

Valery Abisalovich Gergiev (Russian: Валерий Абисалович Гергиев, IPA: [vɐˈlʲerʲɪj ɐbʲɪˈsaləvʲɪdʑ ˈɡʲerɡʲɪjɪf]; Iron Ossetic: Гергиты Абисалы фырт Валери, romanized: Gergity Abisaly fyrt Valeri; born 2 May 1953) is a Russian conductor and opera company director. He is general director and artistic director of the Mariinsky Theatre and of the Bolshoi Theatre and artistic director of the White Nights Festival in St. Petersburg. He was formerly chief conductor of the Rotterdam Philharmonic Orchestra and of the Munich Philharmonic.

== Early life ==
Gergiev was born in Moscow. He is the son of Tamara Timofeevna (Tatarkanovna) Lagkueva and Abisal Zaurbekovich Gergiev, both of Ossetian origin. He and his siblings were raised in Vladikavkaz in North Ossetia in the Caucasus. He had his first piano lessons in secondary school before going on to study at the Leningrad Conservatory from 1972 to 1977.

His principal conducting teacher was Ilya Musin. His sister, Larissa, is a pianist and director of the Mariinsky's singers' academy.

== Career ==
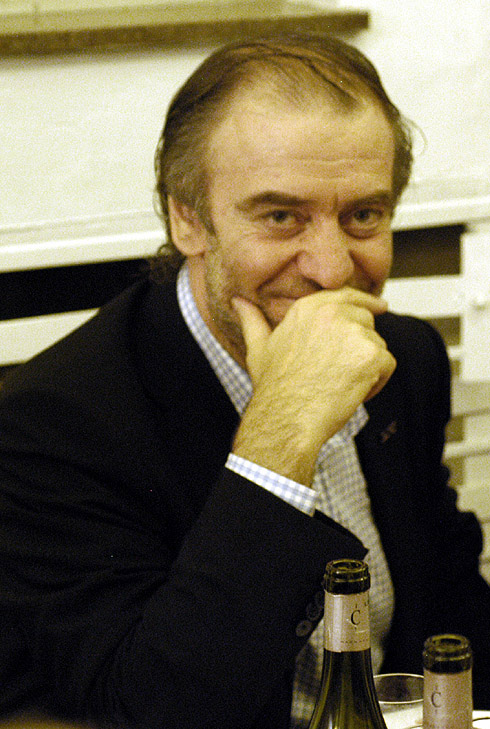
Gergiev in Brussels in 2007

In 1978, Gergiev became assistant conductor at the Kirov Opera, now the Mariinsky Opera, under Yuri Temirkanov, where he made his debut conducting Sergei Prokofiev's War and Peace. He was chief conductor of the Armenian Philharmonic Orchestra from 1981 until 1985. He became chief conductor and artistic director of the Mariinsky in 1988, and overall director of the company, appointed by the Russian government, in 1996.

After the 2004 Beslan school massacre, Gergiev appealed on television for calm and against revenge. He conducted concerts to commemorate the victims of the massacre.

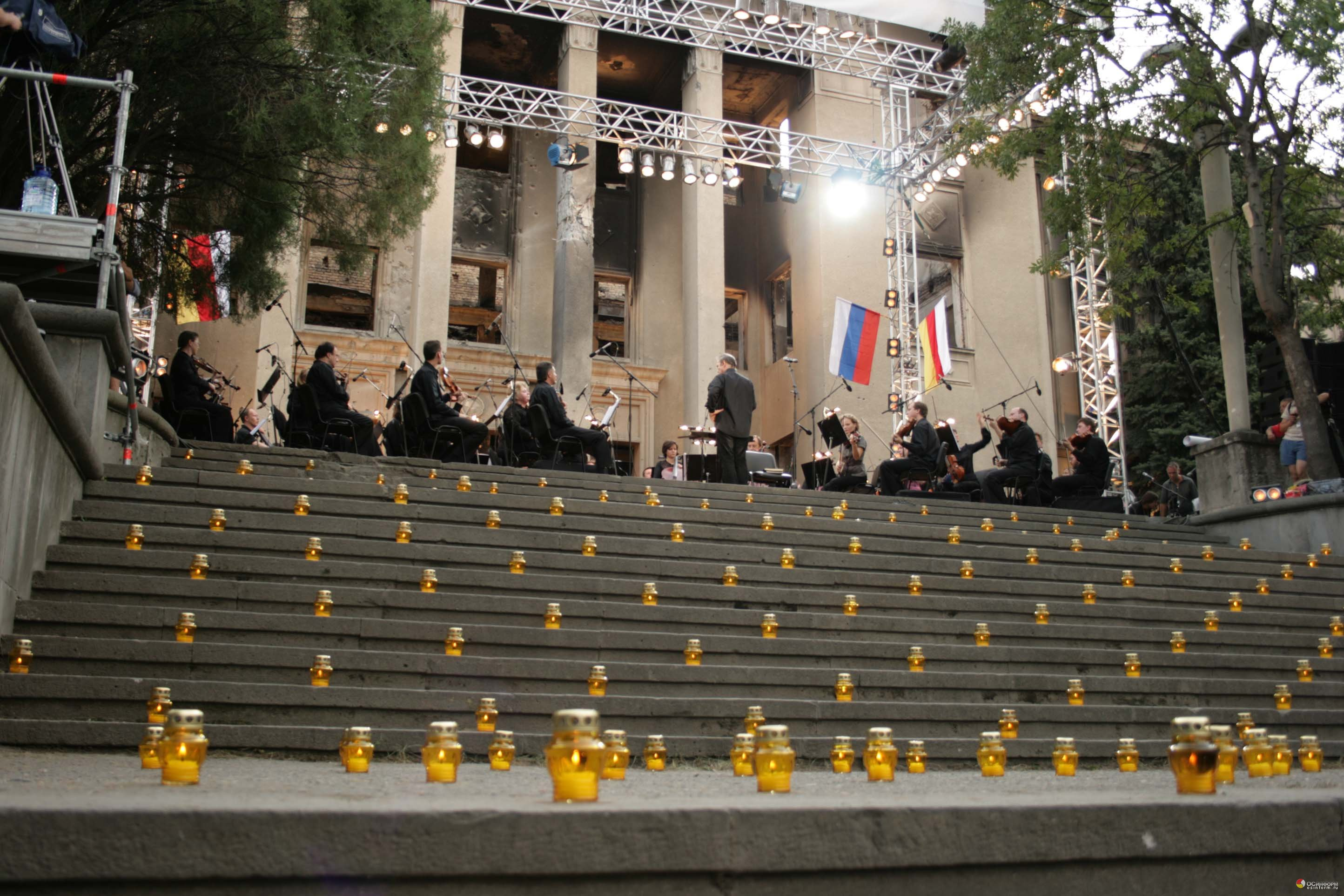
Valery Gergiev's requiem concert in Tskhinvali, 21 August 2008

During the 2008 South Ossetia war, Gergiev, who is of partial Ossetian heritage himself, accused the Georgian government of massacring ethnic Ossetians, triggering the conflict with Russia. He came to Tskhinvali and conducted a concert near the ruined building of the South Ossetian Parliament as tribute to the victims of the war.

In June 2011, Gergiev joined the International Tchaikovsky Competition and introduced reforms to the organisation. On 5 May 2016, Gergiev performed at the Roman Theatre of Palmyra at a concert event called Praying for Palmyra – Music revives ancient ruins, devoted to casualties of the March 2016 Palmyra offensive.

In December 2023, Gergiev was appointed artistic director of the Bolshoi Theatre, with immediate effect, with an initial contract of 5 years. Gergiev is the first person to hold the directorships of the Mariinsky Theatre and the Bolshoi Theatre simultaneously.

=== Career outside of Russia ===
In 1985, Gergiev made his debut in the United Kingdom, along with pianist Evgeny Kissin and violinists Maxim Vengerov and Vadim Repin at the Lichfield Festival. In 1988, Gergiev guest-conducted the London Symphony Orchestra (LSO) for the first time. In 1991, Gergiev conducted a western European opera company for the first time, leading the Bavarian State Opera in a performance of Modest Mussorgsky's Boris Godunov in Munich. In the same year, he made his American début, performing War and Peace with the San Francisco Opera. From 1995 until 2008 Gergiev was principal conductor of the Rotterdam Philharmonic Orchestra. Gergiev returned to the LSO in 2004, in concerts with the seven symphonies of Sergei Prokofiev. This engagement led to his appointment in 2005 as the orchestra's fifteenth principal conductor, as of 1 January 2007, with an initial contract of 3 years.

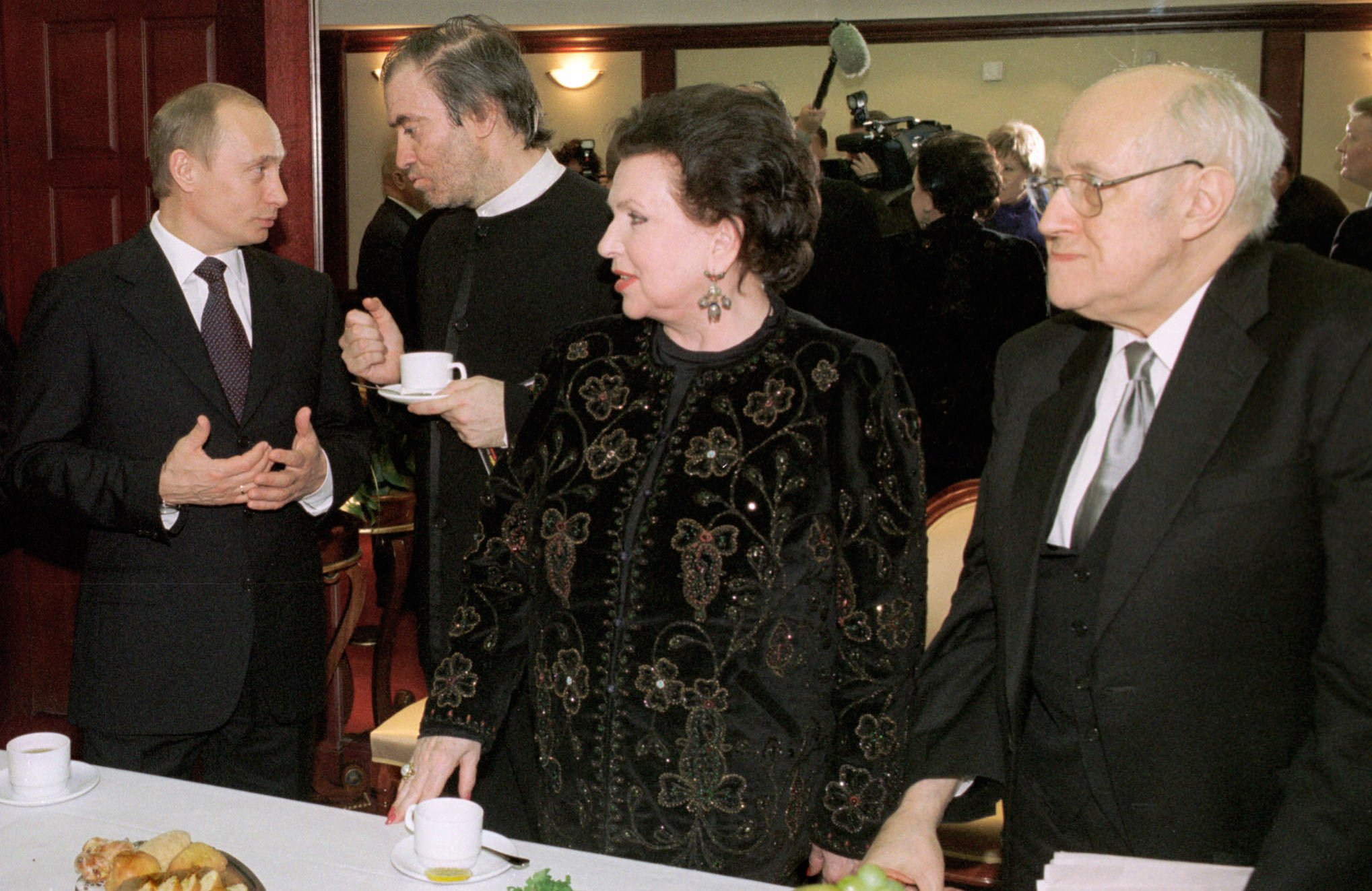
Gergiev with Vladimir Putin, Mstislav Rostropovich and Galina Vishnevskaya on opened of Moscow International House of Music, 26 December 2002

In April 2007, Gergiev was one of eight conductors of British orchestras to endorse the ten-year classical music outreach manifesto, "Building on Excellence: Orchestras for the 21st century", to increase the presence of classical music in the UK, including giving free entry to all British schoolchildren to a classical music concert. Gergiev stood down as LSO principal conductor in 2015, partly because of his critic Kirill Veselago (1962-2019), a Russian journalist still alive and active at the time.

In 2015, Gergiev became chief conductor of the Munich Philharmonic, In March 2022, Gergiev was dismissed from Munich Philharmonic after he refused to condemn the 2022 Russian invasion of Ukraine.

== Political involvement ==
Gergiev has been, according to Alex Ross in The New Yorker, "a prominent supporter of the current Russian regime" of Vladimir Putin. In 2012, in a television ad for Putin's third Presidential campaign, he said: "One needs to be able to hold oneself presidentially, so that people reckon with the country. I don't know if it's fear? Respect? Reckoning."

In December 2012, Gergiev sided with the Putin administration against the members of Russian band Pussy Riot and suggested that their motivation was commercial.

In New York City in 2013, the LGBT activist group Queer Nation interrupted performances by orchestras conducted by Gergiev at the Metropolitan Opera and Carnegie Hall. The activists cited Gergiev's support for Vladimir Putin, whose government had recently enacted a law that bans the distribution of "propaganda of non-traditional sexual relations" to minors, as the reason for their actions. In London, the veteran activist Peter Tatchell led anti-Gergiev demonstrations. In a public statement Gergiev replied: "It is wrong to suggest that I have ever supported anti-gay legislation and in all my work I have upheld equal rights for all people. I am an artist and have for over three decades worked with tens of thousands of people and many of them are indeed my friends." Writing in The Guardian, Mark Brown wrote: "Gergiev's case was not helped by comments he made to the Dutch newspaper De Volkskrant on 10 September [2013]: 'In Russia we do everything we can to protect children from paedophiles. This law is not about homosexuality, it targets paedophilia. But I have too busy a schedule to explore this matter in detail.'" On 26 December 2013, the city of Munich made public a letter from Gergiev assuring them that he fully supports the city's anti-discrimination law and adding: "In my entire professional career as an artist, I have always and everywhere adhered to these principles and will do so in the future... All other allegations hurt me very much."

In March 2014 he joined a host of other Russian arts and cultural figures in signing an open letter in support of the Annexation of Crimea by the Russian Federation. The letter was posted on the website of Russia's culture ministry on 12 March 2014. In the letter signatories stated that they "firmly declare our support for the position of the president of the Russian Federation" in the region. However, in September 2015, as he became chief conductor of the Munich Philharmonic, Gergiev said that he did not really sign the letter to Putin, but only had a phone conversation about it with Vladimir Medinsky. The New York Times reported that Russian artists may have been pushed by the Russian government to endorse the annexation of Crimea. The article specifically mentioned Gergiev, who faced protests in New York City while performing. After a public outcry in the country, the Ukrainian Ministry of Culture blacklisted Gergiev from performing in Ukraine.

=== Terminations after 2022 Russian invasion of Ukraine ===
On 24 February 2022, Russian Armed Forces began a war of aggression against Ukraine in violation of international law on Putin's orders. One day later, the Rotterdam Philharmonic Orchestra said that it would drop Gergiev from its September festival if he did not stop supporting Putin. Milan's La Scala sent a letter to Gergiev asking him to declare his support for a peaceful resolution in Ukraine or he would not be permitted to complete his engagement conducting Tchaikovsky's The Queen of Spades. This followed an announcement by New York City's Carnegie Hall that it had canceled two May performances by the Mariinsky Theatre Orchestra that were to be conducted by Gergiev, and the Vienna Philharmonic dropping Gergiev from a five-concert tour in the U.S. that was to start on 25 February.

On 28 February, the Verbier Festival requested and accepted Gergiev's resignation as music director of the Verbier Festival Orchestra. On 1 March, Munich's mayor Dieter Reiter announced the termination of Gergiev's contract as conductor of the Munich Philharmonic for failing to respond to a demand that he condemn the "brutal war of aggression that Putin is waging against Ukraine and now, in particular, against our sister city of Kyiv". On 13 October, Gergiev was expelled from his position as a foreign member of the Royal Swedish Academy of Music for his reluctance to condemn the Russian invasion of Ukraine.

Italy's Royal Palace of Caserta cancelled a concert by Gergiev in July 2025. The concert, which was scheduled for 27 July at the palace, was criticized by Ukraine, Italian politicians, and international activists, including Yulia Navalnaya.

== Personal life ==
In 1999, Gergiev married musician Natalya Dzebisova, herself of Ossetian descent and 27 years his junior. They have three children together: two boys and a girl. From time to time, Gergiev has been reported to be a friend of Putin; they have been said to be godfathers to each other's children, but in a letter to The Daily Telegraph Gergiev rejected this notion. From a past relationship with the language teacher Lena Ostovich, he has another daughter, Natasha.

In April 2022, the Anti-Corruption Foundation of Russian Kremlin critic Alexei Navalny released a video revealing the immense wealth of Gergiev, including various properties in Italy (among others Palazzo Barbarigo in Venice), the U.S. and Russia. A significant part of his wealth is said to stem from the inheritance of Yoko Nagae Ceschina.

== Recordings ==
As of 2006, Gergiev focused on recording Russian composers' works, both operatic and symphonic, including Mikhail Glinka, Pyotr Ilyich Tchaikovsky, Alexander Borodin, Nikolai Rimsky-Korsakov, Sergei Prokofiev, Dmitri Shostakovich, Igor Stravinsky and Rodion Shchedrin. Many of his recordings, on the Philips label, were with the Kirov Orchestra. He also recorded with the Vienna Philharmonic. Undertaking such as the complete Prokofiev symphonies (from live concerts of 2004) and a Berlioz cycle, were with the London Symphony Orchestra.

Gergiev's recording of Prokofiev's Romeo and Juliet with London Symphony Orchestra on LSO Live in 2010 was voted the winner of the Orchestral category and the Disc of the Year for the 2011 'BBC Music Magazine Awards'.

=== Discography ===
==== Ballets ====
Album	Orchestra	Label	Discs	Release year
PROKOFIEV: Romeo and Juliet (complete ballet)	Kirov	Philips	2	1991
TCHAIKOVSKY: The Sleeping Beauty (complete ballet)	Kirov	Philips	3	1993
STRAVINSKY: The Firebird (L'Oiseau de feu) (complete ballet)	Kirov	Philips	1	1998
TCHAIKOVSKY: The Nutcracker (complete ballet)	Kirov	Philips	1	1998
STRAVINSKY: The Rite of Spring (Le sacre du printemps) (with Scriabin's The Poem of Ecstasy)	Kirov	Philips	1	2001
STRAVINSKY: The Firebird (complete ballet) (+ Works by Prokofiev & Schnittke)	VPO	TDK	1	2001
TCHAIKOVSKY: Swan Lake (complete ballet) (Highlights available separately)	Mariinsky	Decca	2	2007
PROKOFIEV: Romeo and Juliet (complete ballet)	LSO	LSO Live	2	2010
RAVEL: Daphnis et Chloé (complete ballet) (with Pavane pour une infante défunte and Boléro)	LSO	LSO Live	1	2010
MELIKOV: Legend of Love	Moscow Radio Symphony Orchestra	Melodiya	2	2015

==== Operas ====
Album	Orchestra	Label	Discs	Release year
MUSSORGSKY: Khovanshchina	Kirov	Philips	3	1992
TCHAIKOVSKY: Pique Dame	Kirov	Philips	3	1993
PROKOFIEV: War and Peace	Kirov	Philips	3	1993
RIMSKY-KORSAKOV: Sadko	Kirov	Philips	3	1994
BORODIN: Prince Igor	Kirov	Philips	3	1995
PROKOFIEV: The Fiery Angel	Kirov	Philips	2	1995
RIMSKY-KORSAKOV: The Maid of Pskov	Kirov	Philips	2	1997
VERDI: La Forza del Destino (1862 original version)	Kirov	Philips	3	1997
GLINKA: Ruslan and Ludmila	Kirov	Philips	3	1997
PROKOFIEV: Betrothal in a Monastery	Kirov	Philips	3	1998
TCHAIKOVSKY: Mazeppa	Kirov	Philips	3	1998
TCHAIKOVSKY: Iolanta	Kirov	Philips	2	1998
RIMSKY-KORSAKOV: The Legend of the Invisible City of Kitezh	Kirov	Philips	3	1999
RIMSKY-KORSAKOV: The Tsar's Bride	Kirov	Philips	2	1999
RIMSKY-KORSAKOV: Kashchey the Immortal	Kirov	Philips	1	1999
MUSSORGSKY: Boris Godunov (1869 & 1872 version)	Kirov	Philips	5	1999
PROKOFIEV: The Gambler	Kirov	Philips	2	1999
PROKOFIEV: Semyon Kotko	Kirov	Philips	2	2000
PROKOFIEV: The Love for Three Oranges	Kirov	Philips	2	2001
BARTÓK: Bluebeard's Castle	LSO	LSO Live	1	2009
SHOSTAKOVICH: The Nose	Mariinsky	Mariinsky Live	2	2009
STRAVINSKY: Oedipus rex (Comes with Ballet Les noces)	Mariinsky	Mariinsky Live	1	2010
WAGNER: Parsifal	Mariinsky	Mariinsky Live	4	2010
DONIZETTI: Lucia di Lammermoor	Mariinsky	Mariinsky Live	2	2011

==== Orchestral works ====
Album	Orchestra	Label	Discs	Release year
BORODIN: Symphonies No. 1 & 2	RPhO	Polygram	1	1991
RACHMANINOV: Symphony No. 2	Kirov	Philips	1	1994
TCHAIKOVSKY: 1812 Overture and others	Kirov	Philips	1	1994
STRAVINSKY: The Firebird – SCRIABIN: Prometheus	Kirov	Philips	1	1998
TCHAIKOVSKY: Symphony No. 5	VPO	Philips	1	1999
TCHAIKOVSKY: Symphony No. 6, Francesca da Rimini, Romeo and Juliet	Kirov	Philips	1	2000
RIMSKY-KORSAKOV: Scheherazade, BORODIN: In the Steppes of Central Asia, BALAKIREV: Islamey	Kirov	Philips	1	2001
STRAVINSKY: The Rite of Spring – SCRIABIN: The Poem of Ecstasy	Kirov	Philips	1	2001
PROKOFIEV: Symphony No.1 (+ Works by Stravinsky & Schnittke)	VPO	TDK	1	2001
MUSSORGSKY: Pictures at an Exhibition	VPO	Philips	1	2002
BERLIOZ: Symphonie Fantastique, La Mort de Cléopâtre (Soprano: Olga Borodina)	VPO	Philips	1	2003
PROKOFIEV: Scythian Suite, Alexander Nevsky	Kirov	Philips	1	2003
SHOSTAKOVICH: The War Symphonies (No. 4–9) Each one available separately	Kirov	Philips	5	2005
TCHAIKOVSKY: Symphonies No. 4, 5, 6Each one available separately	VPO	Philips	3	2005
PROKOFIEV: Completes Symphonies (No. 1–7) (No. 4: 1930 + 1947 Versions)	LSO	Philips	4	2006
MAHLER: Symphony No. 1	LSO	LSO Live	1	2008
MAHLER:Symphony No. 3	LSO	LSO Live	2	2008
MAHLER: Symphony No. 6	LSO	LSO Live	1	2008
MAHLER: Symphony No. 7	LSO	LSO Live	1	2008
TCHAIKOVSKY: 1812 Overture, Moscow Cantata, Marche Slave, Coronation March, Danish Overture	Mariinsky	Mariinsky Live	1	2009
MAHLER: Symphony Nos. 2 & 10 (Adagio)	LSO	LSO Live	2	2009
SHOSTAKOVICH: Symphonies No. 1 & 15	Mariinsky	Mariinsky Live	1	2009
MAHLER: Symphony No. 8	LSO	LSO Live	1	2009
MAHLER: Symphony No. 4	LSO	LSO Live	1	2010
SHOSTAKOVICH: Symphonies No. 2 & 11	Mariinsky	Mariinsky Live	1	2010
RACHMANINOV: Symphony No. 2	LSO	LSO Live	1	2010
DEBUSSY: Prélude à l'après-midi d'un faune, La Mer, Jeux	LSO	LSO Live	1	2011
LISZT: Les préludes, MUSSORGSKY: Pictures at an Exhibition (Summer Night Concert Schönbrunn 2011)	VPO	DG	1	2011
MAHLER: Symphony No. 5	LSO	LSO Live	1	2011
MAHLER: Symphony No. 9	LSO	LSO Live	1	2011
SHOSTAKOVICH: Symphonies No. 3 & 10	Mariinsky	Mariinsky Live	1	2011
SHOSTAKOVICH: Symphony No. 7 "Leningrad"	Mariinsky	Mariinsky Live	1	2012
SHOSTAKOVICH: Symphony No. 8	Mariinsky	Mariinsky Live	1	2013
SHOSTAKOVICH: Symphonies No. 4, 5 & 6	Mariinsky	Mariinsky Live	2	2014
Berlioz: Symphonie Fantastique, Overture: Waverley	LSO	LSO Live	1	2014

==== Orchestral works with soloists ====
ALBUM	SOLOIST	ORCHESTRA	LABEL	DISCS	RELEASE YEAR
PROKOFIEV: Complete Piano Concertos (No. 1–5)	Alexander Toradze	Kirov	Philips	2	1998
SCHNITTKE: Viola Concerto (+ Works by Stravinsky & Prokofiev)	Yuri Bashmet	VPO	TDK	1	2001
RACHMANINOV: Piano Concerto No.2, Rhapsody on a Theme of Paganini	Lang Lang	Mariinsky	DG	1	2003
TCHAIKOVSKY & MIASKOVSKY: Violin Concertos	Vadim Repin	Mariinsky	Philips	1	2003
BRAHMS & KORNGOLD: Violin Concertos	Nikolaj Znaider	VPO	RCA Red Seal	1	2009
RACHMANINOV: Piano Concerto No.3, Rhapsody on a Theme of Paganini	Denis Matsuev	Mariinsky	Mariinsky Live	1	2010
TCHAIKOVSKY: Variation on a Rococo Theme, PROKOFIEV: Sinfonia Concertante	Gautier Capuçon	Mariinsky	Virgin	1	2010
Lang Lang: Liszt, My Piano Hero (LISZT: Piano Concerto No. 1)	Lang Lang	VPO	Sony	1	2011
Berlioz: Harold en Italie, La Mort de Cléopâtre	Antoine Tamestit, viola Karen Cargill, mezzo-soprano	LSO	LSO Live	1	2014
RACHMANINOV: Piano Concerto No.3	Behzod Abduraimov	RCO	RCO Live	1	2020

==== Vocal works ====
ALBUM	SOLOIST	ORCHESTRA	LABEL	DISCS	RELEASE YEAR
Tchaikovsky & Verdi Arias	Dmitri Hvorostovsky	Kirov	Philips	1	1990
Tchaikovsky & Verdi Arias	Galina Gorchakova	Kirov	Philips	1	1996
PROKOFIEV: Ivan the Terrible Cantata		RPhO	Philips	1	1998
VERDI: Requiem		Kirov	Philips	2	2001
Russian Album	Anna Netrebko	Mariinsky	DG	1	2006
Homage: The Age Of The Diva	Renée Fleming	Mariinsky	Decca	1	2007
Berlioz: Roméo et Juliette	Olga Borodina Kenneth Tarver Evgeny Nikitin	LSO LSO Chorus	LSO Live	2	2016

=== Videos ===
==== DVD ====
- Valery Gergiev in Rehearsal and Performance
- Verdi: La forza del destino, Marinsky Theatre Orchestra, 1998.
- Valery Gergiev Conducts the Vienna Philharmonic Orchestra in Prokofiev, Schnittke & Stravinsky, 2003.
- 60 Minutes: The Wild Man of Music, 2004.
- Prokofiev: Betrothal in a Monastery, Kirov Opera, 2005.
- Shostakovich against Stalin, 2005.
- Rimsky-Korsakov: Sadko, Kirov Opera, 2006.
- Puccini: Turandot, Vienna Philharmonic, 2006.
- "All the Russias – a musical journey": a five-part documentary through the tradition and heritage of Russian music.
- Tschaikovsky: Eugene Onegin; Dmitri Hvorostovsky, Renee Fleming, Ramon Vargas, Metropolitan Opera, 2007
- "Gergiev Conducts Brahms: Ein Deutsches Requiem" Kringelborn, Kwiecien, Swedish Radio Choir, Rotterdam Philharmonic, 2008
- Berlioz:
  - Benvenuto Cellini, Burkhard Fritz (Benvenuto Cellini), Maija Kovalevska (Teresa), Laurent Naouri (Fieramosca), Kate Aldrich (Ascanio), Xavier Mas (Francesco), Brindley Sherratt (Balducci), Roberto Tagliavini (Bernardino), Adam Plachetka (Pompeo), Sung-Keun Park (Innkeeper), Mikhail Petrenko (Pope Clement VII), Wiener Philharmoniker, Konzertvereinigung Wiener Staatsopernchor, Philipp Stozl, Stage Director. Blu-ray or DVD Naxos 2007 – 2009
  - Les Troyens, Lance Ryan, Énée, Gabriele Viviani, Corhèbe, Gorgio Guiseppini, Panthée, Stephen Milling, Narbal, Éric Cutler, Iopas, Dmitri Voropaev, Hylas, Oksana Shilova, Ascagne, Elisabete Matos, Cassandre, Daniele Barcellona, Didon, Ziata Bulicheva Anna, Cor de la Generolitat Valenciana, Orquestra de la Comunitat Valenciana, Carlus Padrissa, Stage Director. (Recorded on 2009) Blu-ray or DVD Unitel Classica 2010

==== VHS ====
- Tchaikovsky: Pique Dame, Acts 1 and 2, Kirov Opera, 1992.
- Mussorgsky: Boris Godunov, Kirov Opera, 1993.
- Tchaikovsky: Pique Dame, Kirov Opera, 1994.
- Mussorgsky: Kovanshchina, Kirov Orchestra, 1994.
- Prokofiev: Fiery Angel, Polygram Video, 1996.

== Honours and awards ==
Russian

- Hero of Labour of the Russian Federation – for particular services to the State and its people. The new honour was created 29 March 2013, and first awarded on 1 May 2013.
- Cavalier of the Order "For Merit to the Fatherland"

== Gallery ==
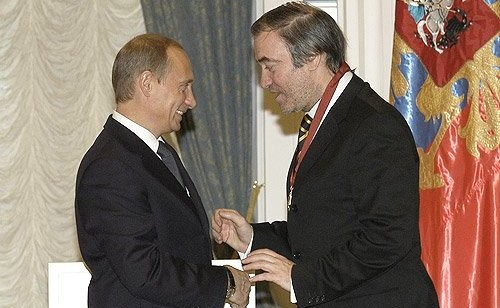
Presentation of the Order "For Merit to the Fatherland", 3rd class (25 December 2003)

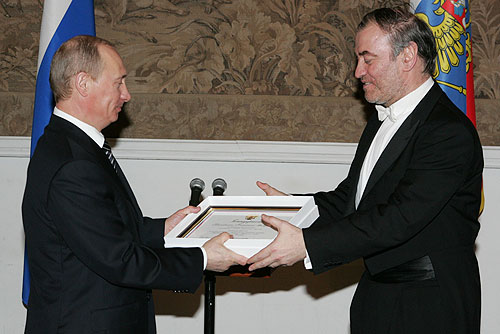
With Vladimir Putin (27 February 2008)

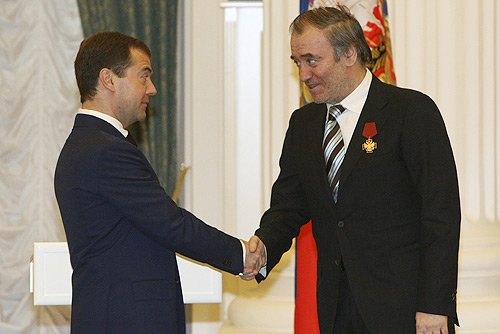
Presentation of the Order "For Merit to the Fatherland", 4th class (23 December 2008)

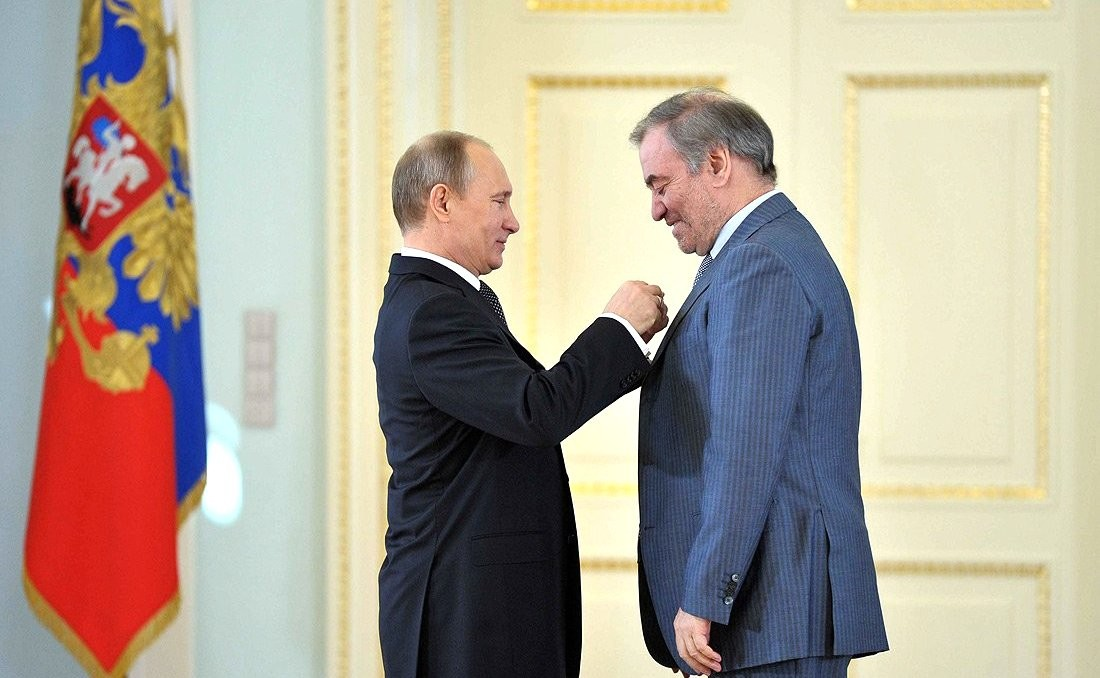
Presentation of Hero of Labour of the Russian Federation (1 May 2013)

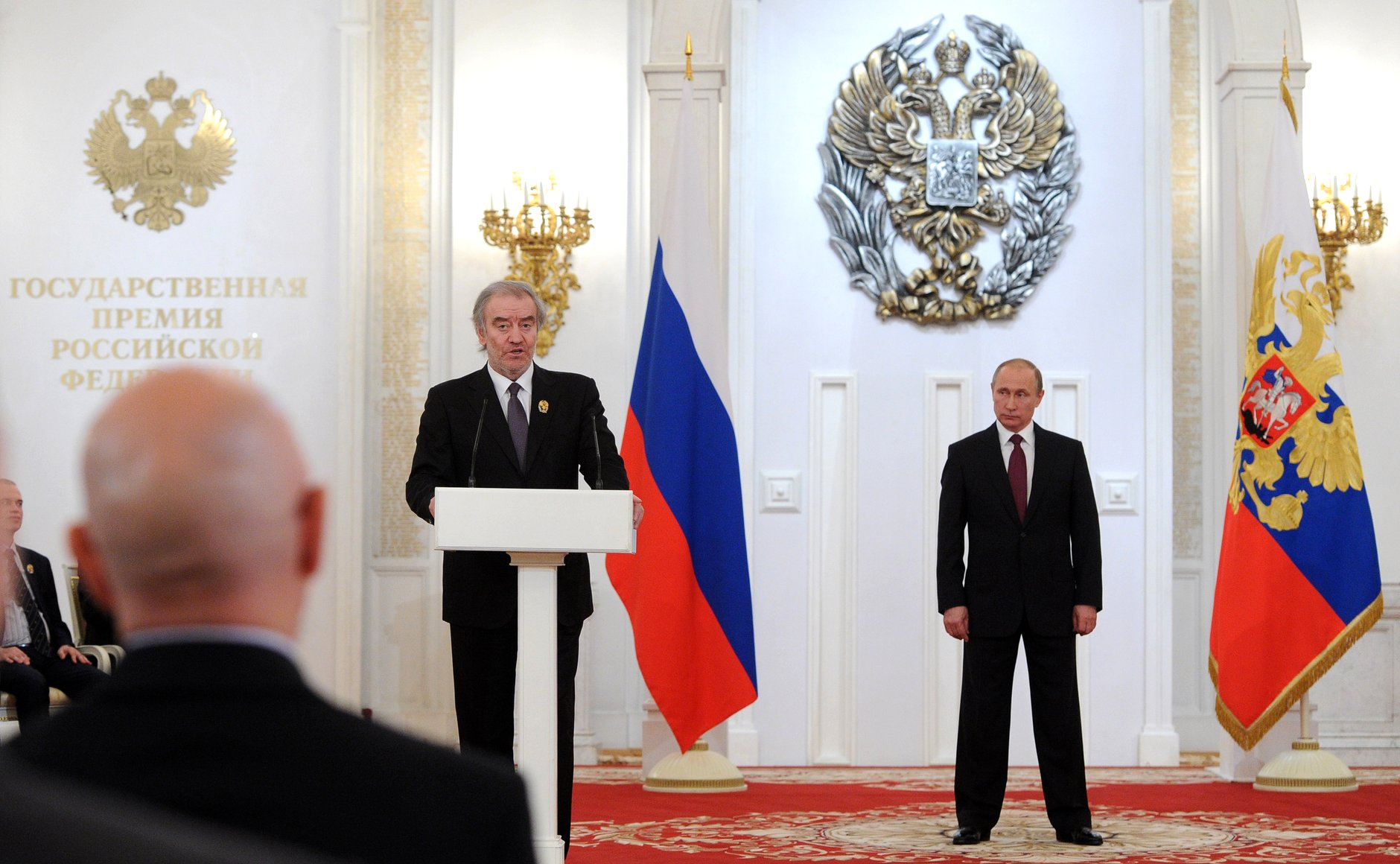
Presentation of the State Awards of the Russian Federation (12 June 2016)

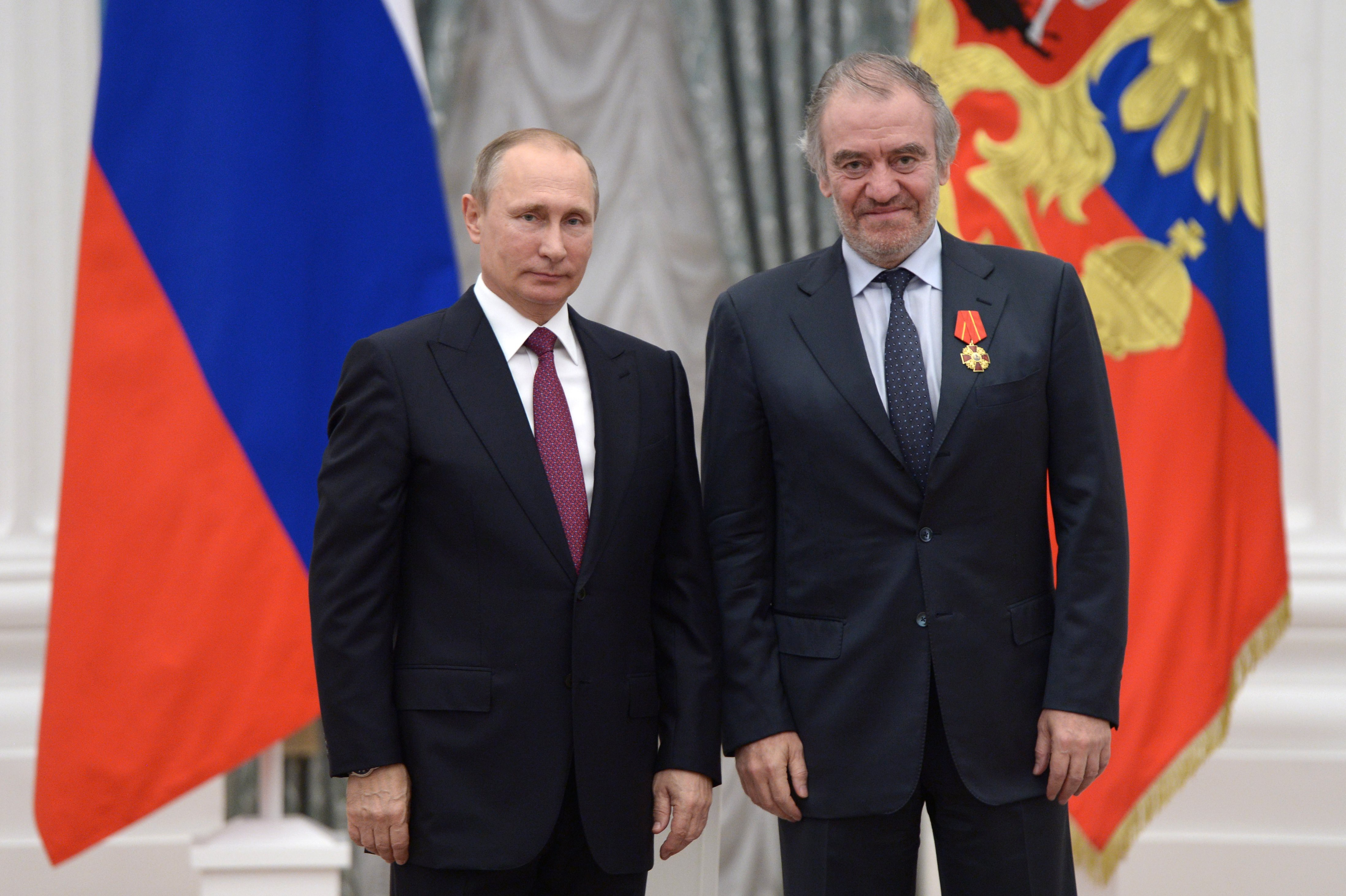
Presentation of the Order of Alexander Nevsky (22 September 2016)

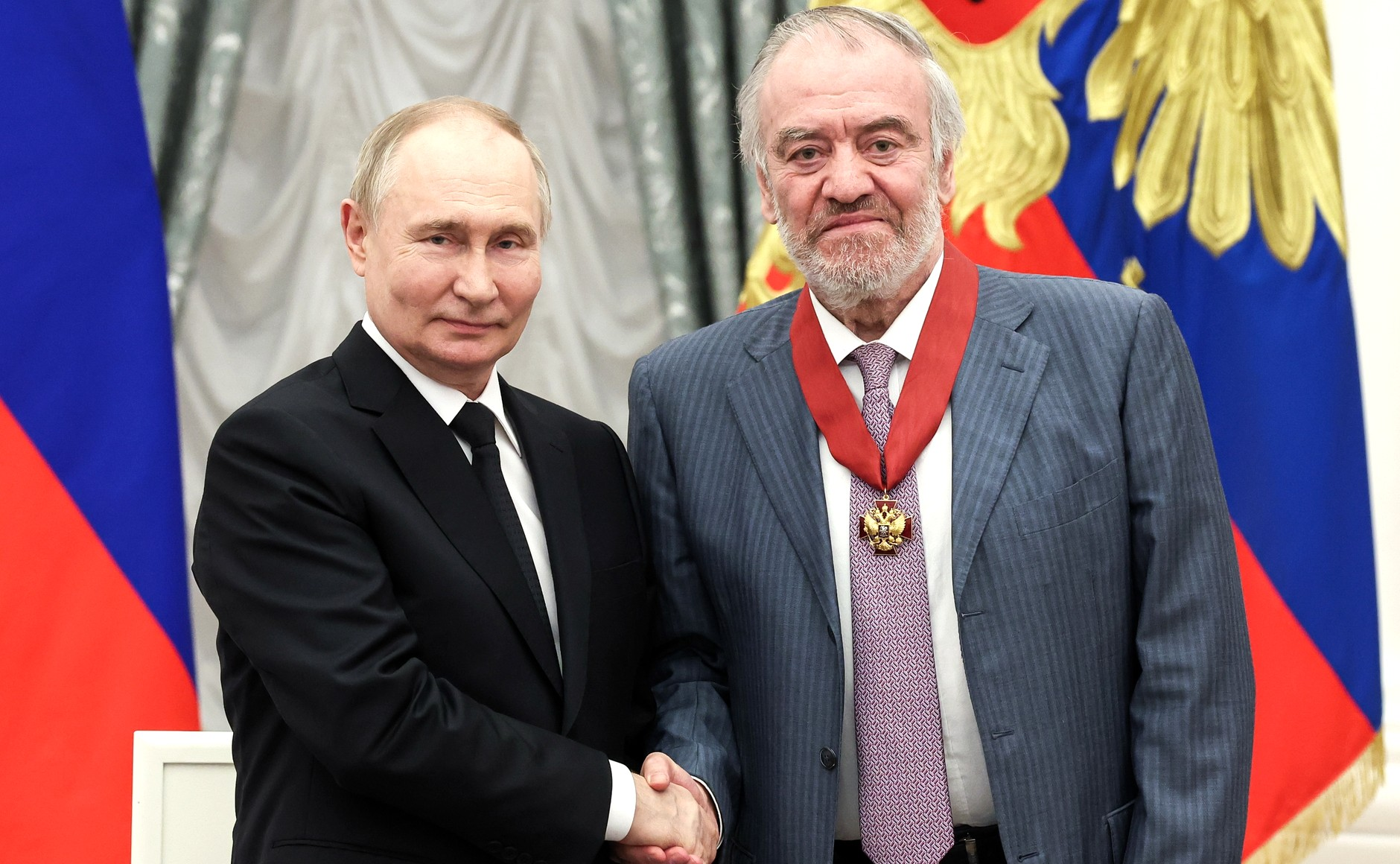
Presentation of the Order "For Merit to the Fatherland", 2nd class (30 May 2024)

== See also ==
- Ballerina (documentary)

Cultural offices
Preceded by David Khanjian	Principal Conductor, Armenian Philharmonic Orchestra; 1981–1985	Succeeded by Rafael Mangassarian
Preceded by Yuri Temirkanov	Principal Conductor and Music Director, Mariinsky Theatre; 1988–present	Succeeded by incumbent
Preceded by Jeffrey Tate	Principal Conductor, Rotterdam Philharmonic Orchestra; 1995–2008	Succeeded by Yannick Nézet-Séguin
Preceded by Vladimir Urin	Artistic Director, Bolshoi Theatre; 2023–present	Succeeded by incumbent
