= Kirill Veselago =

Russian music critic

Kirill Veselago (Note: Russian: Кири́лл Весела́го, romanized: Kirill Veselago, IPA: [kʲɪˈrʲiɫ vʲɪsʲɪˈɫaɡə], a pseudonym most obviously taken after the Russian noble mother of the famous musician Vasily Andreyev (1861–1918).) (full name Kirill Aleksandrovich Shevchenko; (Note: Russian: Кири́лл Алекса́ндрович Шевче́нко, romanized: Kirill Aleksandrovich Shevchenko, IPA: [kʲɪˈrʲiɫ ɐlʲɪˈksandrəvʲɪt͡ɕ ʂɨfˈt͡ɕenkə], a namesake for one third of his full name, at least, of the internationally famous writer Taras Shevchenko (1814–1861).) 7 May 1962 – 15 December 2019) was a Russian music critic, journalist and producer, author of the satirical novel The Phantom of the N's Opera (1996). One of the most famous Saint Petersburg music reviewers of the 1990s.

== Biography ==
Born on 7 May 1962 in Leningrad. In 1985 he graduated from the Faculty of Journalism of Leningrad State University. From 1985 to 1989, he worked in the Leningrad branch of TASS, then in the newspapers Evening Leningrad and Nevsky Time. In the 1990s, he was a leading music critic for the Smena newspaper, where he published until 2000. He collaborated with the publications Russkaya Mysl (lit.The Russian Thought), Moskovskiye Novosti, Ogoniok, published columns on the Fontanka.ru portal and in the magazine Gorod 812.

He died on 15 December 2019, after a long illness.

== Works ==
=== Journalism and criticism ===
Veselago specialized in analytical materials on classical music, opera productions and theatrical life in Saint Petersburg. His reviews were notable by their sharpness and ironic style.

=== The Phantom of the N's Opera novel (1996) ===
A satirical novel ridiculing the backstage of St. Petersburg's leading opera house. Most of the characters had recognizable prototypes from the world of the musical theater of the city in the 1990s. After publication, the circulation of the novel was almost completely bought up by unknown persons to limit its distribution; according to the publisher, there were concerns for personal safety, and individual copies of the book were distributed in photocopies and electronic versions. As a result, the book acquired a semi-legendary "cult" status, with scenes, details, and quotations were actively discussed among experts on the cultural life of St. Petersburg.

A typical quote:

Taking advantage of his "good acquaintances", Drachulos (having managed to seize those years when the Soviet state provided huge copies of records, as well as a hefty fee to the performer) recorded a couple of dozen discs, all from Russian romances. The romances were sung, as they say, "from scratch"; many recordings, besides the superficial and sloppy performance approach, were also frankly fake. Staccato "brought back to life," as stated on the envelopes of the records, "many forgotten masterpieces of Russian music." (As any listener could easily see, they were deservedly forgotten)... In addition, the tenor found unpublished manuscripts of Taneyev somewhere in the basements of the Public House – and, along with many opuses by Kozlovsky, Arensky, Alyabyev and Rimsky-Korsakov, buried them again with his performance. And now, highly likely, forever.

==== The main characters ====
Name	Position	Description	Characteristic quotes
Badger, Marina	Pianist-Concertmaster	Experienced, irreplaceable in rehearsals and concerts, helps both stars and debutants.	"...Marina Badger saved the duet for the third time, playing along from the back of the hall."
Demoniac, Abdulla Uryukovich	Chief Conductor and Artistic Director of the N's Opera and Ballet Theater	The domineering, vain, despotic head of the theater, a fearsome leader, and a careerist of Caucasian descent.	"... gathering his unshaven pimply cheeks into folds, he turned towards the journalists one of the smiles specially reserved for such an occasion: charm with a touch of modesty. "I won't say much: the enormity of our N-Opera's contribution to world musical culture since I became head of the company has been undeniable and recognized on all continents."
Bishkekos, Ovlur	Bass	The important bass, an authoritative figure among singers, is detached, slow and solid.	"A significant silhouette of bass Ovlur Bishkekos appeared in the doorway; having surveyed the horizon, he waltzes towards the counter."
Burelo, Pavel	Baritone	A young, "budding" soloist. He sincerely tries to please, is fussy, speaks with a Little Russian accent.	"The soloist Burelo, a young and, as they say, "promising," obsequiously and fussily rolls up to the director's chairs. He speaks with a bright Little Russian accent, intoning and trying his best to appear weighty, significant, experienced and authoritative."
Japaridze, Vano	Artist	He is slow, important, prone to fantasies, likes to exaggerate his successes.	Vano answers slowly, after a pause. He speaks slowly and importantly... — Harasho went. It's normal. (Again after a pause.) "I bought an island in Monte Carlo..."
Drachoulos, Staccacchi	Tenor, Professor at the Conservatory	A famous, cynical, noisy tenor, Russified Georgian Greek, is known for his "Russian romances."	"The famous tenor, Russified Georgian Greek Staccacchi Drachulos. He immediately attracts attention by burping loudly, like an ovation."
Zabitov, Aryk	Director of Photography	A young debutant director who graduated from the conservatory in the big drum class, a fussy and nervous participant in backstage intrigues.	"Director of photography Aryk Zabitov is running around the stage, shouting and waving his arms. Kashchey is his debut as a director on the nth stage; actually, Zabitov graduated from the conservatory of the city of Luxomukhinsk in the class of the big drum, but, unfortunately, he never learned how to play it."
Cringeos, Shame	Manager of the N's opera	An obsequious former trombonist who became a manager because of his flexible nature. A symbol of careerism and leadership.	"The former trombonist, Shame Cringeos, who now, thanks to his extraordinarily flexible back and knowledge of six sentences in English, holds the position of manager of the N-opera, fussily rushes to push back the chair..."
Katsapova, Laura	Female opera critic	She is youthful, flirtatious, tries to please both colleagues and management, and plays the role of a "star critic."	"... modestly, in the corner, sits the youthful opera critic Laura Katsapova, exuding flirtatious smiles towards the rest of the serious critics."
Nightmare	Conductor	Timid, stutters, carries out all the instructions of the leadership, the symbol of the "six".	"Abdulla Uryukovich! The Nightmare stammered. — You have an orchestra room on the upper stage now..."
Cretinos, Felix Danilovich	Editor-in-chief of the theatrical newspaper	An untidy, quirky, and covertly influential critic.	"Dirty, combed-back hair reveals a low forehead with sharply defined brow ridges; colorless eyes are so bulging from their sockets... dressed in a greasy and tattered jacket of indeterminate color with piles of dandruff on the shoulders."
Matevosyan, Armen	Tenor	Small, obese, with a strong Armenian accent, prone to backstage chatter and cheerful conversations.	"Little and obese Matevosyan greets him with a wave of his short hand and exclaims in a strong Armenian accent: — Pirivet, Ovlur-jyan! Give me a little double!"
Nepotrebko, Alina	Soprano, Prima donna	A young star, eccentric, ambitious, sometimes hysterical, a Demoniac's favorite, a participant in scandals.	"... the compressed air was supposed to make the bogatyr's clothes sway pleasantly to the eye... as a result, the soprano's costume was obscenely sucked into the pipe, depriving the last part of the hair and causing some minor injuries to the face. (Can you imagine the scandal caused by the prima donna, who, as luck would have it, was the Demoniac's favorite on duty at that moment)!"
Nizhak, Sticka	Art Columnist	The assertive one, who has a "pass" to special theatrical events, occupies a privileged position.	"The famous art columnist Sticka Nizhak is perched closest to the conductor's desk."
Dace, Stanislas	Artist-designer	A young and eccentric, outrageous director, loves provocative solutions.	"The design of Stanislav Plotvichka (the young artist was also noticed to be possessed at one time; the conductor literally lured Roach away from the musical theater of Children's Joys)..."
The Phantom of the Opera	A mystical creature	A mysterious character appears in a frock coat and a top hat, acting as a secret critic of what is happening in the theater.	"In an elegant frock coat and a top hat, he stood at the door, staring steadily at Demoniac."
Tracheas, Seva	Baritone	Vividly gifted, indomitable, prone to binge drinking and spontaneous singing, kind, not prone to intrigue.	"In our house, no one even raises an eyebrow: everyone knows that Seva Tracheas, the owner of the fabulous beauty and power of the baritone, is just another binge these days."
Khabibulina, Polina	Mezzo-soprano	A gorgeous and strong young singer, noted as an exceptional figure in the troupe, a participant in the performances.	"The mezzo-soprano Khabibulina (an exceptionally healthy and luxurious person, it should be noted) also added trouble, who, during the performance of the aria "My Damask Sword", hit a cardboard anvil with a tin sword so hard that it shattered..."
Shkalikos	Music Critic	A small, bespectacled, laughing representative of the "serious critics", a symbol of the old school.	"In the plump little man, bent under the weight of huge, seemingly outgrown glasses in massive horn frames, we can easily recognize the famous critic Shkalikos."

== Sources ==
- "Публикации Кирилла Веселаго на «Фонтанке.ру»". Фонтанка.ру.
- "Скончался журналист и музыкальный критик Кирилл Веселаго". Лениздат. 16 December 2019.
- Смолич, Александра Мстиславна. (4 June 2013). "«Опера N-ска»: отзыв и история публикации". LiveJournal.
- Шевлягина, Мария. (17 December 2019). "В Петербурге скончался журналист и музыкальный критик Кирилл Веселаго". Петербургский дневник.
