= Behzadi, Iran =

Behzadi بهزادي
- Village
- Location within Iran
- Coordinates: 30°25′52″N 50°19′34″E
- Country: Iran
- Province: Khuzestan
- County: Behbahan
- Bakhsh: Central
- Rural District: Howmeh

Population (2006)
  - Total: 151
- Time zone: UTC+3:30 (IRST)
  - Summer (DST): UTC+4:30 (IRDT)

Behzadi (Persian: بهزادي, also Romanized as Behzādī) is a village in Howmeh Rural District, in the Central District of Behbahan County, Khuzestan Province, Iran. At the 2006 census, its population was 151, in 27 families.
