= Iranian House of Cartoon =

Coordinates: 35.7513°N 51.4430°E

- خانه کاریکاتور ایران
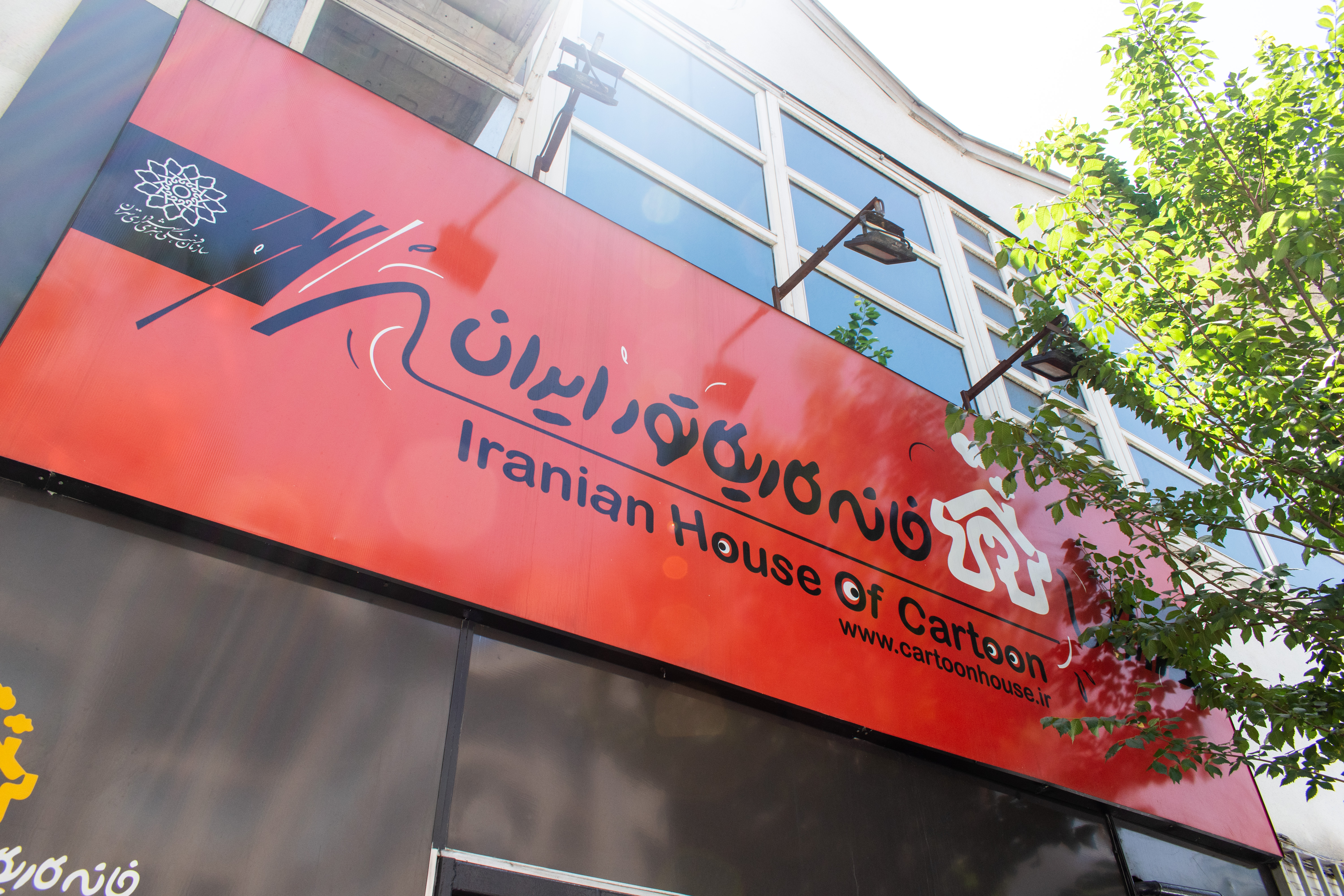
- Established: 1996
- Location: No. 44, Golnabi(ketabi) St., Shariati Ave. Tehran, Iran
- Website: irancartoon.com

Iranian House of Cartoon (Persian: خانه کاریکاتور ایران) was founded in 1996 in affiliation with Tehran Municipality. In addition to hosting temporary exhibitions & acting as an educational center of cartoon & animation, it has been the permanent secretariat of Tehran International Cartoon Biennial.
