= Grigore Ghica =

Grigore Ghica may refer to:

- Grigore I Ghica, Prince of Wallachia (1660–1664; 1672–1673)
- Grigore II Ghica, Prince of Moldavia (1726–1733; 1735–1739; 1739–1741; 1747–1748)
- Grigore III Ghica (died 1777), Prince of Moldavia (1764–1767; 1774–1777) and Prince of Wallachia (1768–1769)
- Grigore IV Ghica (1755–1834), Prince of Wallachia (1822–1828)
- Grigore Alexandru Ghica (1803 or 1807–1857), Prince of Moldavia (1849–1853; 1854–1856)
- Ioan Grigore Ghica (1830–1881), Foreign Minister and Defence Minister, son of Grigore Alexandru Ghica
