= Sahand Noor Mohammadzadeh =

- Known for: 2021–2022 Iranian protests
- Criminal charges: Moharebeh through destroying and setting fire to public facilities in order to disturb the order and security of the country and confront the Islamic government, society and collusion with the intention of committing a crime against the security of the country and disrupting the public order and comfort through participating in the nationwide protests of Iran.

Sahand Noormohammadzadeh (born 1375) is a bodybuilder and one of the prisoners of 2021–2022 Iranian protests in Tehran, who was sentenced to death for destroying and setting fire to public facilities. On November 16, he was tried for the charge of "waging war against God and the state" in Branch 29 of the Revolutionary Court of Tehran.

== reactions ==
In an interview with "Sharq", the lawyer of the case informed about the rejection of the second judge's opinion and said: "The case has not yet reached the stage of issuing a verdict." According to the law, the final decision must be signed by 2 judges, one is the main judge, the head of the branch, and the other is the advisor. The main judge has issued his decision, which is unfortunately a muharibeh decision. The news was published based on the verdict issued by the same judge, but the second judge did not agree to sign and confirm the verdict issued as moharebeh for Sahand Noor Mohammadzadeh. In this way and according to the law, the issued sentence must go to the third judge. The third judge is the head of the 27th branch. In this regard, the Media Center of the Judiciary says: "Based on the follow-ups carried out by the 29th branch of the Revolutionary Court, it was found that the mentioned claim is not true and the issued verdict has been signed by 2 judges of the case and all legal procedures have been completed. According to the judge of the case, the legal procedure was followed correctly and the claims of the lawyer of the case are not true. The issued verdict is preliminary and can be appealed in the Supreme Court of the country." According to his father, he has been on a hunger strike for three days in protest against the death sentence.

== Charges and court ==
On November 16, the hearing of Qabadalo's accusations was held in Branch 29 of Tehran Revolutionary Court. Hamed Ahmadi, Taskhiri Noor Mohammadzadeh's lawyer, confirmed that the death sentence was served on him for the charge of moharebeh and stated: "This sentence is preliminary and can be appealed in the Supreme Court." This protester, who was born in 1375, was charged in the court with the charge of "warfare by destroying and setting fire to public facilities in order to disrupt the order and security of the country and confronting the Islamic government, assembly and collusion with the intention of committing a crime against the security of the country and disrupting the order." and public comfort through participating in rallies" was tried. The examples and documents of the judicial branch about Noor Mohammadzadeh include videos where it seems that he is present among the protesters who blocked the street. But his lawyer has said that "we do not consider the actions of the client to be considered moharebeh in any way. The testimony of an accused person against another accused person does not have any Shariah or legal authority.
