= Behzad Behzadpour =

Iranian actor and film editor

- بهزاد بهزادپور
- Born: 1961 (age 64–65); Tehran, Iran
- Occupations: Film director, producer, writer
- Years active: 1995–present

Behzad Behzadpour (born 1961– Tehran) is an Iranian director, screenwriter, editor and film actor.

== Filmography ==
=== Director ===
- Khodahafez Rafiq (Episode 1) (2003)
- Khodahafez Rafiq (Episode 2) (2003)
- Khodahafez Rafiq (Episode 3) (2003)

=== the writer ===
- non-profit Police Station (2008)
- Khodahafez Rafiq (Episode 1) (2003)
- Khodahafez Rafiq (Episode 2) (2003)
- Khodahafez Rafiq (Episode 3) (2003)
- Ranger (1999)
- Secret Club (1998)
- Peak of the World (1995)
- Last Identification (1995)
