= Deh Now-e Behzadi =

Deh Now-e Behzadi دهنوبهزادي
- Village
- Location within Iran
- Coordinates: 28°47′30″N 58°51′39″E
- Country: Iran
- Province: Kerman
- County: Fahraj
- Bakhsh: Central
- Rural District: Borj-e Akram

Population (2006)
  - Total: 1,167
- Time zone: UTC+3:30 (IRST)
  - Summer (DST): UTC+4:30 (IRDT)

Deh Now-e Behzadi (Persian: دهنوبهزادي, also Romanized as Deh Now-e Behzādī; also known as Deh-e Now and Dehnow) is a village in Borj-e Akram Rural District, in the Central District of Fahraj County, Kerman Province, Iran. At the 2006 census, its population was 1,167, in 277 families.
