= Behzod Abduraimov =

Uzbek pianist (born 1990)

Behzod Abduraimov (born 11 September 1990) is an Uzbek pianist. A former student of Van Cliburn International Piano Competition gold medalist Stanislav Ioudenitch at Park University's International Center for Music (ICM), he was described by The Independent as "the most perfectly accomplished pianist of his generation". Abduraimov won the London International Piano Competition in 2009 at the age of 18, which launched his career. He continues to perform internationally in solo recitals, chamber music performances, and as soloist with leading orchestras such as the Boston Symphony Orchestra, City of Birmingham Symphony Orchestra, Cleveland Orchestra, Israel Philharmonic Orchestra, Los Angeles Philharmonic, Mariinsky Orchestra, NHK Symphony Orchestra, Seoul Philharmonic Orchestra, Los Angeles Philharmonic, Sydney Symphony Orchestra, and The New York Philharmonic under such conductors as Valery Gergiev, Vladimir Ashkenazy, Manfred Honeck, Vasily Petrenko, James Gaffigan, Jakub Hrůša, Thomas Dausgaard and Vladimir Jurowski.

== Early life and education ==
Abduraimov was born in Tashkent, Uzbekistan, and began to play the piano at the age of five. He initially started his studies with his pianist mother, later studying with Tamara Popovich. At the age of 15, he began studying with Stanislav Ioudenitch, gold medalist of the Van Cliburn International Piano Competition in 2001, at Park University's International Center for Music (ICM). Since 2014, Abduraimov has served as the ICM's artist-in-residence.

== Career ==
In 2009, at the age of 18, Abduraimov won the London International Piano Competition. His performance of Sergei Prokofiev’s Piano Concerto No. 3 (Op. 26) in the final round with the London Philharmonic Orchestra was described by The Daily Telegraph as “the most enthralling roller-coaster ride of a Prokofiev third concerto imaginable.” Shortly after his victory in London, he substituted for Martha Argerich in a performance of the concerto with Charles Dutoit and the Royal Philharmonic Orchestra, and also toured China, performing as a soloist with the Sydney Symphony Orchestra conducted by Vladimir Ashkenazy. In 2010 he won the Kissinger Sommer festival's international piano competition, Kissinger Klavierolymp. Soon after, Abduraimov signed with HarrisonParrott artist management and the Decca Classics record label.

Abduraimov has collaborated with numerous major international orchestras, including the New York Philharmonic, Los Angeles Philharmonic, Mariinsky Orchestra, Hong Kong Philharmonic Orchestra, Cleveland Orchestra, Munich Philharmonic Orchestra, Boston Symphony Orchestra, Fort Worth Symphony Orchestra, Royal Concertgebouw Orchestra, Hr-Sinfonieorchester, San Francisco Symphony, Dallas Symphony Orchestra, Atlanta Symphony Orchestra, Montreal Symphony Orchestra, Yomiuri Nippon Symphony Orchestra, Seoul Philharmonic Orchestra, West Australian Symphony Orchestra, Pittsburgh Symphony Orchestra, Czech Philharmonic, BBC Symphony Orchestra, Orchestre National de Lyon, City of Birmingham Symphony Orchestra, NDR Elbphilharmonie Orchestra, Bergen Philharmonic Orchestra, and the Israel Philharmonic Orchestra, working with such conductors as Valery Gergiev, Vladimir Ashkenazy, Manfred Honeck, Vasily Petrenko, James Gaffigan, Jakub Hrůša, Thomas Dausgaard and Vladimir Jurowski. He has also collaborated with such musicians as Truls Mørk and his mentor Stanislav Ioudenitch, and appeared at such festivals as the Aspen Music Festival, Verbier Festival, Ravinia Festival, and the Vail Valley Music Festival.

In 2012, Abduraimov released his debut album for Decca, a recording of Sergei Prokofiev's Piano Sonata No. 6 and other works by Prokofiev, Liszt and Saint-Saëns: the album won the Choc de Classica and the Diapason Découverte. His second album for Decca, a recording of Prokofiev's Piano Concerto No. 3 and Tchaikovsky's Piano Concerto No. 1 with the Orchestra Sinfonica Nazionale della RAI conducted by Juraj Valčuha, was released in 2014.

In July 2014, Abduraimov, substituting for Yefim Bronfman, performed Tchaikovsky's Piano Concerto No. 1 with the Los Angeles Philharmonic at the Hollywood Bowl. Later that year, in October, he substituted for Leila Josefowicz and performed Prokofiev Piano Concerto No. 3 with the orchestra at Walt Disney Concert Hall. Although he got his own gig with the Los Angeles Philharmonic in August 2017 (performing Rachmaninoff's Piano Concerto No. 3 at the Hollywood Bowl), he substituted for Khatia Buniatishvili in July 2018 and performed Rachmaninoff's Piano Concerto No. 2 with the orchestra at the Hollywood Bowl.

In 2016, at the age of 26, Abduraimov made his solo recital debut in the Stern Auditorium of Carnegie Hall, becoming one of the very few young artists to do so; he played works by Schubert, Beethoven, Prokofiev, Tchaikovsky, and Liszt in addition to transcriptions of Johann Sebastian Bach by Alfred Cortot and Ferrucio Busoni. He had played a solo recital in Carnegie Hall's much smaller Weill Recital Hall that previous year, and also performed Prokofiev's Piano Concerto No. 3 with the Mariinsky Orchestra and Valery Gergiev at the Stern Auditorium in a concert that was broadcast by the video streaming platform Medici.tv. That same year, he also made his debut at the BBC Proms, performing Sergei Rachmaninoff's Piano Concerto No. 3 with the Munich Philharmonic conducted by Valery Gergiev; his performance was described by The Guardian as a "glitteringly idiomatic account". In 2017, Abduraimov returned to the Proms, performing Rachmaninoff's Piano Concerto No. 2 with the BBC National Orchestra of Wales conducted by Thomas Søndergård.
