= Amrillo Inoyatov =

Uzbek government official (born 1979)

Amrillo Inoyatov Amrillo Inoyatov Иноятов Амрилло Шодиевич
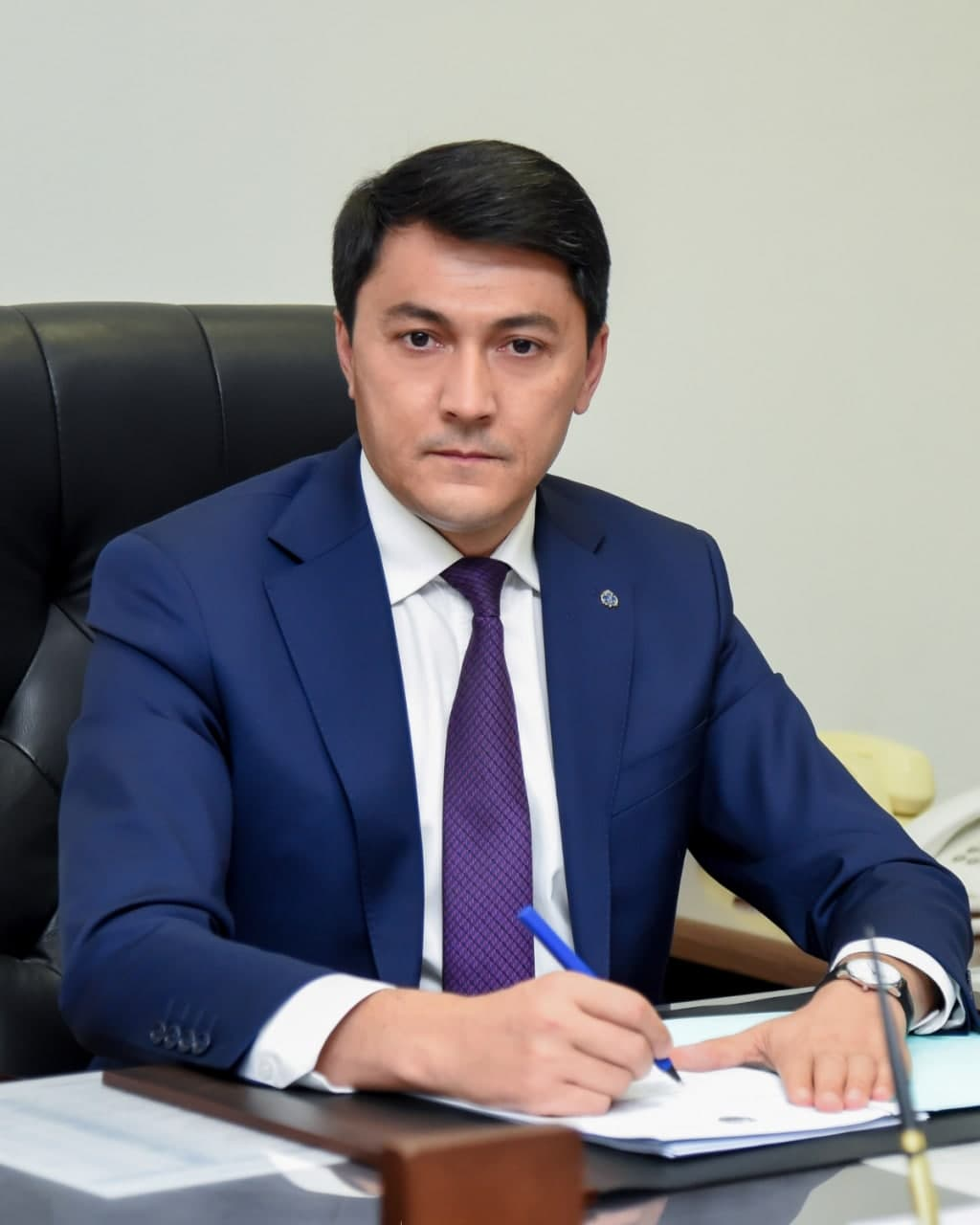
- Inoyatov in 2020

Minister of Health at Ministry of Public Health
- Incumbent
- Assumed office December 29, 2022
- President: Shavkat Mirziyoyev
- Minister: Abdulla Aripov
- Preceded by: Behzod Musaev

Personal details
- Born: 14 October 1979 (age 46)
- Education: Bukhara State Medical Institute

Amrillo Inoyatov (uzb: Inoyatov Amrillo cycrillic: Иноятов Амрилло Шодиевич born 1979 Bukhara, Uzbekistan) is an Uzbekistani plastic surgeon, former Minister at the Ministry of Health of the Republic of Uzbekistan and former Deputy Advisor to the President of the Republic of Uzbekistan on youth, science, education, healthcare, culture and sports. In 2024, he has been appointed as the Director of the Institute of Health and Strategic Development.

== Career ==
- 2017 - Rector of the Bukhara State Medical Institute
- 2020 - National counterpart of the World Health Organization
- 2020 - July–November - Deputy Advisor to the President of the Republic of Uzbekistan on youth, science, education, healthcare, culture and sports.
- 2020 November – December 2022 - First Deputy Minister of Health of the Republic of Uzbekistan
- 30 December 2022 - Minister of Health of the Republic of Uzbekistan

== Controversies ==
In February 2023, Inoyatov was criticized for remarks he made during a press briefing when a journalist asked about increasing the salaries of medical staff in Uzbekistan. Instead of addressing the issue of wages, he suggested that doctors could be additionally motivated if patients voluntarily gave them small "tips" as a sign of gratitude for special care, even if the doctors did not ask for it.

The statement was widely condemned by the Public Council under the Anti-Corruption Agency, which argued that such suggestions contradicted national anti-corruption policies, could legitimize bribery in healthcare, and risked undermining the status of medical professionals. Media outlets and civil society groups also criticized the remarks as encouraging informal payments instead of systemic salary reforms.

== Scientific literature ==
Inoyatov is the Chairman of the editorial board of the journal "World Medicine Journal" since 2020

- The condition of immune system of infants with congenital cleft lip and palate (March 2012)
- The level of mediators of immune response in infants with congenital cleft lip and palate. Medical and Health Science Journal (2012)
- Comparative Assessment of Structural and Functional Changes in Periodontal Tissues during Prosthetics with Metal-Ceramic and Zirconium Dentures (2020)
