= Mariinsky Theatre Orchestra =

Orchestra based in St. Petersburg, Russia

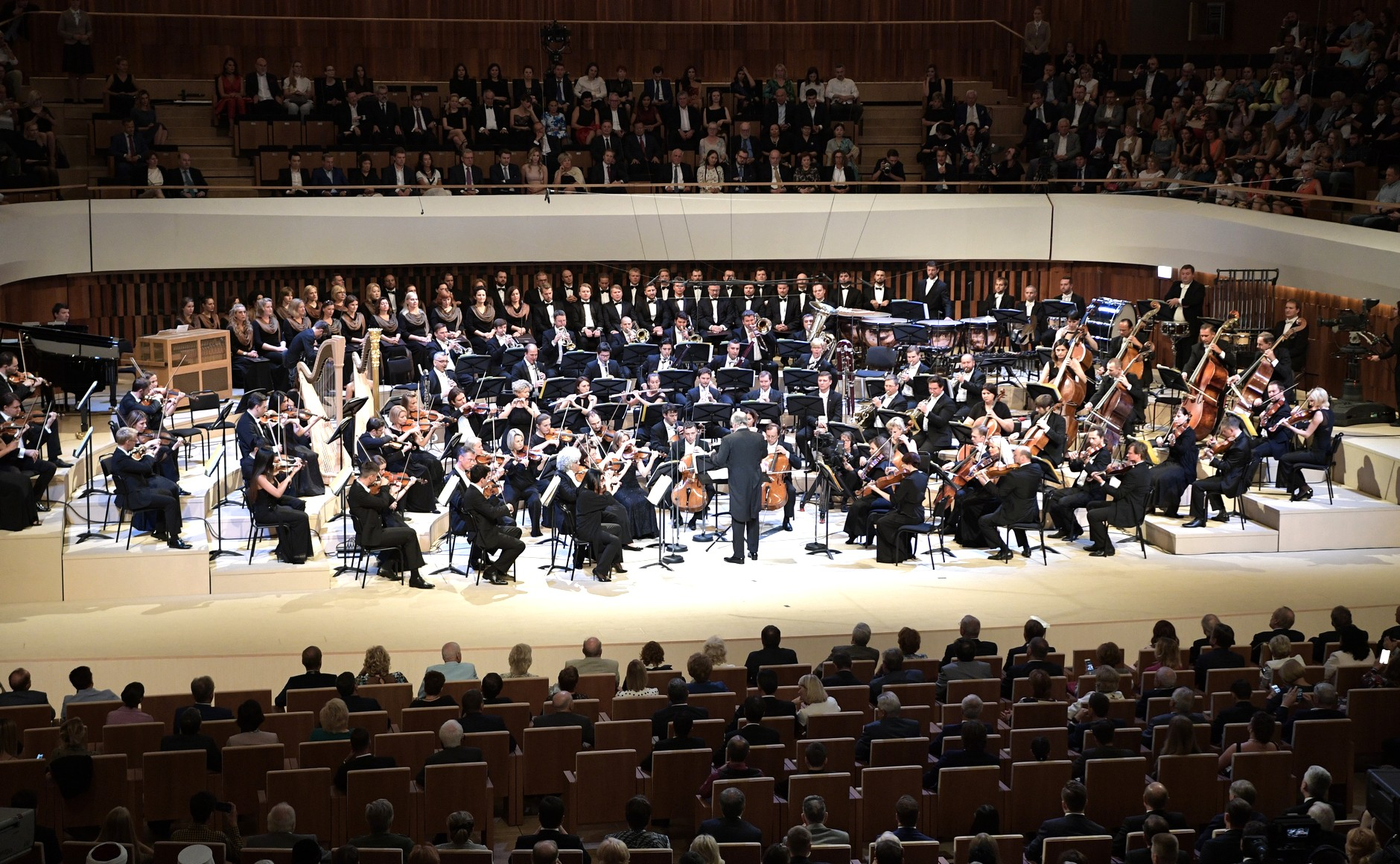
The Mariinsky Theater Orchestra at the Zaryadye Concert Hall in 2018

The Mariinsky Theatre Orchestra or just the Mariinsky Orchestra (formerly known as the Kirov Orchestra) is located in the Mariinsky Theatre in St. Petersburg, Russia. The orchestra was founded in 1783 during the reign of Catherine the Great, it was known before the revolution as the Russian Imperial Opera Orchestra. The orchestra is one of the oldest musical institutions in Russia.

In 1935 Joseph Stalin changed its name (and that of the Ballet) to the Kirov, after Sergei Kirov, the first secretary of the Communist Party in Leningrad, whose 1934 murder by his regime Stalin was attempting to whitewash. After the collapse of the Soviet Union, the name was changed to its current one in 1992.

The current artistic and general director of the Mariinsky Theatre is the conductor Valery Gergiev. Under Gergiev, the Mariinsky Orchestra has become one of the leading symphony orchestras in Russia. Ensembles of the orchestra's soloists participate in festivals.
