= Behzad Mohammadzadeh =

Iranian hacker

Behzad Mohammedzadeh
- بهزاد محمدزاده
- Other name: Mrb3hz4d
- Criminal charges: Computer fraud
- Criminal status: Fugitive

Behzad Mohammadzadeh (Persian: بهزاد محمدزاده) is an Iranian hacker and cyber-fugitive. Mohammadzadeh is wanted by the FBI for cybercrimes.

== Background ==
Behzad Mohammadzadeh was born c. 2001. (Note: According to the Department of Justice, at the time of his indictment in 2020, Mohammadzadeh was "approximately 19 years old".) Little is known about his early life.

== Criminal career ==
In 2020, Mohammadzadeh and another hacker named Marwan Abusrour defaced multiple American government websites after the death of Qasem Soleimani; they defaced the websites by putting the Iranian flag and the text "Down with America" on the websites. Mohammadzadeh was indicted in Massachusetts on the charges of Conspiracy to Commit Intentional Damage to a Protected Computer and Intentional Damage to a Protected Computer.
