= Behzod Hoshimov =

Uzbek economist (born 1993)

Bekhzod Khoshimov
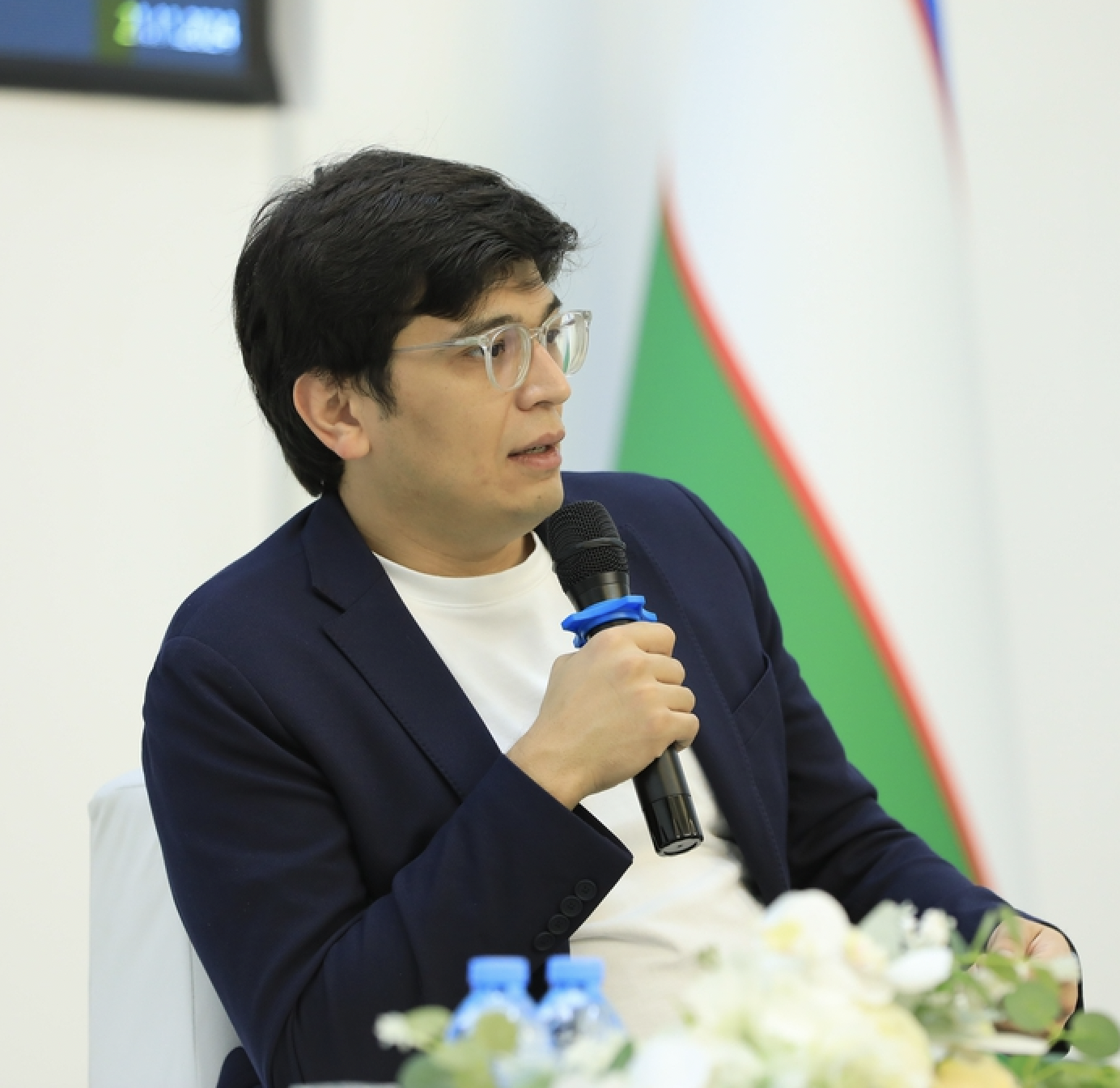
- Born: August 8, 1993 (age 33); Tashkent, Uzbekistan

Academic background
- Education: Nanyang Technological University (BA 2015)

Academic work
- Discipline: Entrepreneurship, Human Capital, Economics of Innovation
- Institutions: University of Wisconsin-Madison (2016–2024); Wisconsin Institute for Discovery (2016–2024)NYU Abu Dhabi (2024–present)

Behzod Hoshimov (also spelled Khoshimov; born August 8, 1993, Tashkent, UzSSR) is an Uzbek economist and researcher specializing in entrepreneurship, human capital, and the economics of innovation. He currently serves as an Assistant Professor of Business, Organizations, and Society at New York University Abu Dhabi. Previously, he was a Postdoctoral Fellow at the Wisconsin Institute for Discovery at the University of Wisconsin–Madison.

== Career ==
Behzod Hoshimov studied Applied Mathematics at Nanyang Technological University in Singapore (B.Sc.) and Economics at the University of Wisconsin–Madison (M.S.), before earning his Ph.D. at the Wisconsin School of Business. His research focuses on the determinants of early-stage entrepreneurial success and the factors that influence the supply of entrepreneurs in society.

Behzod Hoshimov initiated and played a key role in translating and publishing Why Nations Fail by Daron Acemoglu and James A. Robinson into Uzbek. The 2023 release marked the first time the influential work was made available in the Uzbek language and was accompanied by James Robinson's visit to Tashkent, where he engaged in public discussions and academic events.

In addition to his academic work, Hoshimov actively comments on economics and public policy. Through his Telegram blog, Iqtisodchi Kundaligi ("Diary of an Economist"), he writes about economics, social science research, and current economic and political developments in both Uzbekistan and the wider world.

Hoshimov is also the creator and host of the YouTube channel Hoshimov's Economics («Hoshimov Iqtisodiyoti»), a series of conversations covering topics such as economics, science, history, education, development, and Uzbekistan's future. His guests have included Nobel Prize laureates in Economic Sciences Daron Acemoglu and James Robinson, as well as policymakers and intellectuals such as Timur Ishmetov, Jo'rabek Mirzamahmudov, Sodiq Safoyev, Tymofiy Mylovanov, Michael McFaul, Francis Fukuyama, Jennifer Murtazashvili, Sergey Guriyev, and Natalya Zubarevich. His channel has been recognized as a valuable educational resource, notably recommended by Alisher Sadullayev, Chairperson of the Youth Union of Uzbekistan.

Hoshimov has contributed as an opinion columnist for Gazeta.uz, one of Uzbekistan's leading publications, where he wrote on economic and institutional reforms. He is also a co-host of Uzbekonomics, a podcast focused on economics, development, and Uzbek society.

== Publications and articles ==
1. Jonathan T. Eckhardt, Clint Harris, Chuan Chen, Bekhzod Khoshimov & Brent Goldfarb (2022) Student regional origins and student entrepreneurship, Regional Studies, 56:6, 956-971, DOI: 10.1080/00343404.2021.1987408
2. Bekhzod Khoshimov, Jonathan Thomas Eckhardt, and Brent Goldfarb, 2019: Abandonment of the Applicants Signal: Grades and Entrepreneurship. Proceedings, 2019,
3. Entrepreneurs, Signaling and Education. Bekhzod Khoshimov, Brent Goldfarb and Jon Eckhardt Published Online:28 Jan 2019.
4. Vague Language, Founding Team Human Capital, and Resource Acquisition. By: Andy El-Zayaty, Martin Ganco, Bekhzod Khoshimov. Published Online:23 Apr 2025 https://doi.org/10.1287/orsc.2022.16367
5. Three Essays on Behavioral Entrepreneurship by Khoshimov, Bekhzod. The University of Wisconsin - MadisonDissertations & Theses, 2023.
6. Consequences of Collective Turnover: A Matter of Time and Quality by Rakoon Piyanontalee and Bekhzod Khoshimov. Published Online:1 Aug 2019 https://doi.org/10.5465/AMBPP.2019.16026abstract
7. Goldfarb, Brent D. and Khoshimov, Bekhzod and Eckhardt, Jonathan T and Eckhardt, Jonathan T, Grade Dispersion and Entrepreneurship: Divergent Strategies of Student-Seekers and Student-Entrepreneurs. Available at SSRN: https://ssrn.com/abstract=5210947 or http://dx.doi.org/10.2139/ssrn.5210947

== Patents ==
1. U.S. Patent No.US 11676053 B2, titled "Systems, methods, and media for automatically identifying entrepreneurial individuals in a population using individual and population level data."
