= Ministry of Public Health (Uzbekistan) =

Uzbekistan governmental body responsible for public health

Ministry of Public Health of the Republic of Uzbekistan
- O'zbеkistоn Respublikasi Sоg'liqni sаqlаsh vazirligi
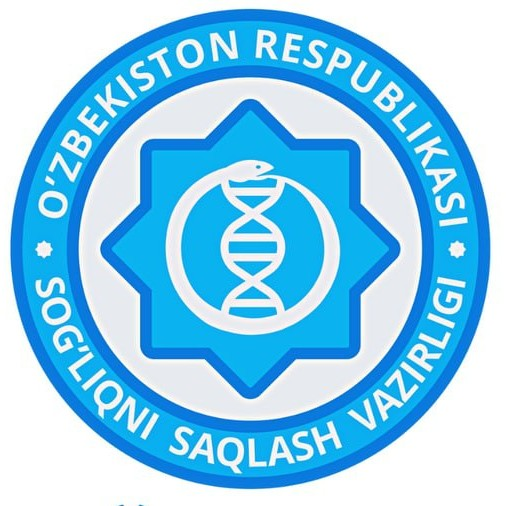

Agency overview
- Jurisdiction: Government of Uzbekistan
- Headquarters: Tashkent, Uzbekistan
- Minister responsible: Eldor Odilov, Minister of Public Health
- Website: mvd.uz

The Ministry of Public Health of the Republic of Uzbekistan, (Uzbek: O'zbеkistоn Respublikasi Sоg'liqni sаqlаsh vazirligi), is an agency of the government of Uzbekistan, headquartered in Tashkent. The Ministry of Health of the Republic of Uzbekistan (herein after referred as to The Ministry) is the central governmental management organ of management in healthcare and in its activities is subordinated to the Cabinet of Ministers of Uzbekistan.

The Ministry accomplishes its work in interaction with other state administration bodies, executive bodies of the Republic of Karakalpakstan, regions, city of Tashkent and public organizations.

== The ministry ==
In its activities the Ministry follows the Constitution of the Republic of Uzbekistan, laws and other acts of the Oliy Majlis (Parliament) of the Republic of Uzbekistan, resolutions and orders of the President of the Republic of Uzbekistan, resolutions and orders of the Cabinet of Ministers, other legislative acts, as well as international agreements of the Republic of Uzbekistan on health care issues and the current Regulations.

Normative legal documents of the Ministry, being issued in the limits of its competence are obligatory for execution by the governmental organs, establishments, organizations, regardless to form of ownership, public associations and individuals on the territory of the Republic of Uzbekistan.

Ministry of Health of the Republic of Uzbekistan, Ministry of Health of the Republic of Karakalpakstan, health care management bodies of regions and Tashkent city, their subdivisions in cities and districts compile a single system of health care management bodies of the republic.

Ministry of Health as a legal entity has separate estate on basis of right of operative management, independent balance, transaction and other accounts at the banks’ branch offices, a stamp with the image of the national state emblem of the Republic of Uzbekistan and the Ministries’ name.

== List of ministers ==
- 1991-1998 — Shavkat Karimov
- 1998-2009 — Feruz Nazirov
- 2009-2012 — Adham Ikromov
- 2012-2016 — Anvar Alimov
- 2016-2017 — Adham Ikromov
- 2017-2020 — Alisher Shodmonov
- 2020-2021 — Abduhakim Hojiboyev
- 2021-2022 — Behzod Musaev
- 2022-2024 — Amrillo Inoyatov
- 2024-2026 — Asilbek Khudoyorov
- Since 2026 — Eldor Odilov
