= Sar Tang =

Sar Tang or Sar-e Tang (Persian: سرتنگ) may refer to:

== Chaharmahal and Bakhtiari Province ==
- Sar Tang, Chaharmahal and Bakhtiari, a village in Ardal County
- Sartang-e Badam Shirin, a village in Kuhrang County
- Sartang-e Dinar Ali, a village in Lordegan County
- Sar Tang-e Mesen, a village in Lordegan County

== Fars Province ==
- Sar Tang, Fars, a village in Sepidan County
- Sar Tang-e Bala, a village in Darab County
- Sartang-e Bozorg, a village in Mamasani County
- Sar Tang-e Kuchak, a village in Mamasani County

== Hormozgan Province ==
- Sar Tang, Hormozgan, a village in Khamir County
- Sar Tang-e Darreh Shir, a village in Hajjiabad County

== Ilam Province ==
- Sartang, Ilam, a village in Eyvan County
- Sar Tang-e Olya, a village in Eyvan County
- Shahrak-e Sartang-e Bijar, a village in Ilam County
- Shahrak-e Sartang, a village in Shirvan and Chardaval County

== Kerman Province ==
- Sar Tang-e Darrehi, a village in Faryab County

== Kermanshah Province ==
- Sartang, Kermanshah, a village in Dalahu County

== Khuzestan Province ==
- Sar Tang, Andika, a village in Andika County
- Sar Tang, Chelo, a village in Andika County
- Sar Tang-e Dulab, a village in Andika County
- Sar Tang-e Gadarkhani, a village in Andika County
- Sartang-e Galal Sharb, a village in Bagh-e Malek County
- Sar Tang-e Soleyman Koshteh, a village in Bagh-e Malek County
- Sar Tang, Izeh, a village in Izeh County
- Sartang-e Faleh, a village in Izeh County
- Sartang-e Shab Kuri, a village in Izeh County
- Sar Tang, Lali, a village in Lali County
- Sar Tang, Ramhormoz, a village in Ramhormoz County

== Kohgiluyeh and Boyer-Ahmad Province ==
- Sar Tang, Basht, a village in Basht County
- Sartang, Sepidar, a village in Boyer-Ahmad County
- Sar Tang-e Firuzabad, a village in Boyer-Ahmad County
- Sar Tang-e Pivareh, a village in Boyer-Ahmad County
- Sartang-e Tang Sorkh, a village in Boyer-Ahmad County
- Sar Tang-e Deh Kohneh Hamidabad, a village in Dana County
- Sartang-e Ravaq, a village in Dana County
- Sartang-e Tomanak, a village in Dana County
- Sar Tang-e Tut-e Nadeh, a village in Dana County
- Sar Tang ol Majan, a village in Kohgiluyeh County
- Sartang-e Lirab, a village in Kohgiluyeh County
- Sartang-e Landeh, a village in Landeh County
- Sar Tang-e Mugarmun, a village in Landeh County

== Lorestan Province ==
- Sartang-e Barzeh, a village in Aligudarz County
- Sar Tang Mahi, a village in Aligudarz County
- Sar Tang-e Bid Gijeh, a village in Khorramabad County
- Sar Tang-e Eslamabad, a village in Khorramabad County
- Sar Tang-e Leyshan, a village in Khorramabad County

== West Azerbaijan Province ==
- Sar Tang, West Azerbaijan, a village in Mahabad County
- Sartang, alternate name of Sartan, Iran, a village in Mahabad County
