= Sar Tall =

Sar Tall, Sar Tal, Sar Tol, Sar-e Tal, Sar-e Tall, Sar-e Tol, Sartal, or Sartol (Persian: سرتل) may refer to various places in Iran:

- Aliabad-e Sar Tol, Fars, Fars province
- Sar Tol, Fars, Fars province
- Sar-e Tall, Hormozgan, Hormozgan province
- Sartol, Dehdez, Khuzestan province
- Sartal, Kohgiluyeh and Boyer-Ahmad, Kohgiluyeh and Boyer-Ahmad province
- Sartal-e Dingu, Kohgiluyeh and Boyer-Ahmad province
- Sartal-e Melleh Gahar, Kohgiluyeh and Boyer-Ahmad province
- Sartol, Kohgiluyeh and Boyer-Ahmad, Kohgiluyeh and Boyer-Ahmad province
- Sar Tall, Khash, Sistan and Baluchestan province
