= Tamanak =

Tamanak or Tomanak (Persian: تمنك), also rendered as Tumanak, may refer to:

- Tamanak-e Olya, Boyer-Ahmad
- Tamanak-e Sofla, Boyer-Ahmad
- Tomanak-e Olya, Dana
- Tomanak-e Sofla, Dana
