= Posht-e Chah =

Posht-e Chah پشت چاه
- Village
- Location within Iran
- Coordinates: 31°04′20″N 51°10′51″E
- Country: Iran
- Province: Kohgiluyeh and Boyer-Ahmad
- County: Dana
- Bakhsh: Pataveh
- Rural District: Sadat Mahmudi

Population (2006)
  - Total: 94
- Time zone: UTC+3:30 (IRST)
  - Summer (DST): UTC+4:30 (IRDT)

Posht-e Chah (Persian: پشت چاه, also Romanized as Posht-e Chāh; also known as Pas-e Chāh and Poshteh Chāh) is a village in Sadat Mahmudi Rural District, Pataveh District, Dana County, Kohgiluyeh and Boyer-Ahmad Province, Iran. At the 2006 census, its population was 94, in 23 families.
