= Cheshmeh Rizak-e Shabliz =

Cheshmeh Rizak-e Shabliz چشمه ريزك شبليز
- Village
- Location within Iran
- Coordinates: 31°07′58″N 50°59′48″E
- Country: Iran
- Province: Kohgiluyeh and Boyer-Ahmad
- County: Dana
- Bakhsh: Pataveh
- Rural District: Pataveh

Population (2006)
  - Total: 47
- Time zone: UTC+3:30 (IRST)
  - Summer (DST): UTC+4:30 (IRDT)

Cheshmeh Rizak-e Shabliz (Persian: چشمه ريزك شبليز, also Romanized as Cheshmeh Rīzak-e Shablīz) is a village in Pataveh Rural District, Pataveh District, Dana County, Kohgiluyeh and Boyer-Ahmad Province, Iran. At the 2006 census, its population was 47, in 9 families.
