= Cheshmeh Mir Hasani =

Cheshmeh Mir Hasani چشمه ميرحسني
- Village
- Location within Iran
- Coordinates: 31°05′55″N 51°11′50″E
- Country: Iran
- Province: Kohgiluyeh and Boyer-Ahmad
- County: Dana
- Bakhsh: Pataveh
- Rural District: Sadat Mahmudi

Population (2006)
  - Total: 42
- Time zone: UTC+3:30 (IRST)
  - Summer (DST): UTC+4:30 (IRDT)

Cheshmeh Mir Hasani (Persian: چشمه ميرحسني, also Romanized as Cheshmeh Mīr Ḩasanī) is a village in Sadat Mahmudi Rural District, Pataveh District, Dana County, Kohgiluyeh and Boyer-Ahmad Province, Iran. At the 2006 census, its population was 42, in 6 families.
