= Khomeyniabad-e Darshahi =

Khomeyniabad-e Darshahi خميني اباددارشاهي
- Village
- Location within Iran
- Coordinates: 30°50′43″N 51°20′56″E
- Country: Iran
- Province: Kohgiluyeh and Boyer-Ahmad
- County: Dana
- Bakhsh: Central
- Rural District: Dana

Population (2006)
  - Total: 79
- Time zone: UTC+3:30 (IRST)
  - Summer (DST): UTC+4:30 (IRDT)

Khomeyniabad-e Darshahi (Persian: خميني اباددارشاهي, also Romanized as Khomeynīābād-e Dārshāhī; also known as Khomeynīābād) is a village in Dana Rural District, in the Central District of Dana County, Kohgiluyeh and Boyer-Ahmad Province, Iran. At the 2006 census, its population was 79, in 13 families.
