= Cheshmeh Nesai-ye Banestan =

Cheshmeh Nesai-ye Banestan چشمه نسه اي بنستان
- Village
- Location within Iran
- Coordinates: 31°03′47″N 51°14′41″E
- Country: Iran
- Province: Kohgiluyeh and Boyer-Ahmad
- County: Dana
- Bakhsh: Pataveh
- Rural District: Sadat Mahmudi

Population (2006)
  - Total: 22
- Time zone: UTC+3:30 (IRST)
  - Summer (DST): UTC+4:30 (IRDT)

Cheshmeh Nesai-ye Banestan (Persian: چشمه نسه اي بنستان, also Romanized as Cheshmeh Nesā'ī-ye Banestān; also known as Cheshmeh Nesā'ī) is a village in Sadat Mahmudi Rural District, Pataveh District, Dana County, Kohgiluyeh and Boyer-Ahmad Province, Iran. At the 2006 census, its population was 22, in 4 families.
