= Darb Kalat-e Emamzadeh Mahmud =

Darb Kalat-e Emamzadeh Mahmud درب كلات امامزاده محمود
- Village
- Location within Iran
- Coordinates: 31°09′29″N 51°04′29″E
- Country: Iran
- Province: Kohgiluyeh and Boyer-Ahmad
- County: Dana
- Bakhsh: Pataveh
- Rural District: Sadat Mahmudi

Population (2006)
  - Total: 720
- Time zone: UTC+3:30 (IRST)
  - Summer (DST): UTC+4:30 (IRDT)

Darb Kalat-e Emamzadeh Mahmud (Persian: درب كلات امامزاده محمود, also Romanized as Darb Kalāt-e Emāmzādeh Maḩmūd; also known as Dar Kalāt-e Maḩmūd and Dar Kalāt-e Maḩmūdī) is a village in Sadat Mahmudi Rural District, Pataveh District, Dana County, Kohgiluyeh and Boyer-Ahmad Province, Iran. At the 2006 census, its population was 720, in 151 families.
