= Karreh Karami =

Karreh Karami كره كرمي
- Village
- Location within Iran
- Coordinates: 30°55′07″N 51°18′27″E
- Country: Iran
- Province: Kohgiluyeh and Boyer-Ahmad
- County: Dana
- Bakhsh: Central
- Rural District: Tut-e Nadeh

Population (2006)
  - Total: 340
- Time zone: UTC+3:30 (IRST)
  - Summer (DST): UTC+4:30 (IRDT)

Karreh Karami (Persian: كره كرمي, also Romanized as Karreh Karamī; also known as Karreh) is a village in Tut-e Nadeh Rural District, in the Central District of Dana County, Kohgiluyeh and Boyer-Ahmad Province, Iran. At the 2006 census, its population was 340, in 76 families.
