= Darreh-ye Bani Yab Bahram Beygi =

Darreh-ye Bani Yab Bahram Beygi دره بنياب بهرام بيگي
- Village
- Location within Iran
- Coordinates: 30°58′46″N 51°10′21″E
- Country: Iran
- Province: Kohgiluyeh and Boyer-Ahmad
- County: Dana
- Bakhsh: Pataveh
- Rural District: Pataveh

Population (2006)
  - Total: 149
- Time zone: UTC+3:30 (IRST)
  - Summer (DST): UTC+4:30 (IRDT)

Darreh-ye Bani Yab Bahram Beygi (Persian: دره بنياب بهرام بيگي, also Romanized as Darreh-ye Banī Yāb Bahrām Beygī; also known as Darreh-ye Banī Yāb) is a village in Pataveh Rural District, Pataveh District, Dana County, Kohgiluyeh and Boyer-Ahmad Province, Iran. At the 2006 census, its population was 149, in 30 families.
