= Lahsavareh =

Lahsavareh له سواره
- Village
- Location within Iran
- Coordinates: 31°04′34″N 51°11′15″E
- Country: Iran
- Province: Kohgiluyeh and Boyer-Ahmad
- County: Dana
- Bakhsh: Pataveh
- Rural District: Sadat Mahmudi

Population (2006)
  - Total: 95
- Time zone: UTC+3:30 (IRST)
  - Summer (DST): UTC+4:30 (IRDT)

Lahsavareh (Persian: له سواره, also Romanized as Lahsavāreh; also known as Lahvāreh) is a village in Sadat Mahmudi Rural District, Pataveh District, Dana County, Kohgiluyeh and Boyer-Ahmad Province, Iran. At the 2006 census, its population was 95, in 19 families.
