= Tang-e Putak =

Tang-e Putak تنگ پوتك
- Village
- Location within Iran
- Coordinates: 30°57′47″N 51°18′55″E
- Country: Iran
- Province: Kohgiluyeh and Boyer-Ahmad
- County: Dana
- Bakhsh: Central
- Rural District: Tut-e Nadeh

Population (2006)
  - Total: 74
- Time zone: UTC+3:30 (IRST)
  - Summer (DST): UTC+4:30 (IRDT)

Tang-e Putak (Persian: تنگ پوتك, also Romanized as Tang-e Pūtak; also known as Tang-e Bāvarā) is a village in Tut-e Nadeh Rural District, in the Central District of Dana County, Kohgiluyeh and Boyer-Ahmad Province, Iran. At the 2006 census, its population was 74, in 17 families.
