= Kohleh-ye Hammam =

Kohleh-ye Hammam كهله حمام
- Village
- Location within Iran
- Coordinates: 31°04′34″N 51°10′29″E
- Country: Iran
- Province: Kohgiluyeh and Boyer-Ahmad
- County: Dana
- Bakhsh: Pataveh
- Rural District: Sadat Mahmudi

Population (2006)
  - Total: 64
- Time zone: UTC+3:30 (IRST)
  - Summer (DST): UTC+4:30 (IRDT)

Kohleh-ye Hammam (Persian: كهله حمام, also Romanized as Kohleh-ye Ḩammām; also known as Koleh-ye Ḩammām) is a village in Sadat Mahmudi Rural District, Pataveh District, Dana County, Kohgiluyeh and Boyer-Ahmad Province, Iran. At the 2006 census, its population was 64, in 11 families.
