= Mashk Kar Jalaleh =

Mashk Kar Jalaleh ماشك كارجلاله
- Village
- Country: Iran
- Province: Kohgiluyeh and Boyer-Ahmad
- County: Dana
- Bakhsh: Pataveh
- Rural District: Sadat Mahmudi

Population (2006)
  - Total: 29
- Time zone: UTC+3:30 (IRST)
  - Summer (DST): UTC+4:30 (IRDT)

Mashk Kar Jalaleh (Persian: ماشك كارجلاله, also Romanized as Māshk Kār Jalāleh) is a village in Sadat Mahmudi Rural District, Pataveh District, Dana County, Kohgiluyeh and Boyer-Ahmad Province, Iran. At the 2006 census, its population was 29, in 5 families.
