= Gendi Khori =

Gendi Khori (Persian: گندي خوري) may refer to:

- Gendi Khori-ye Olya
- Gendi Khori-ye Sofla
- Gendi Khori-ye Vosta
