= Khungah =

Khungah خونگاه
- Village
- Location within Iran
- Coordinates: 31°02′18″N 51°17′57″E
- Country: Iran
- Province: Kohgiluyeh and Boyer-Ahmad
- County: Dana
- Bakhsh: Pataveh
- Rural District: Pataveh

Population (2006)
  - Total: 387
- Time zone: UTC+3:30 (IRST)
  - Summer (DST): UTC+4:30 (IRDT)

Khungah (Persian: خونگاه, also Romanized as Khūngāh and Khūnegāh; also known as Khūnegān and Khūngān) is a village in Pataveh Rural District, Pataveh District, Dana County, Kohgiluyeh and Boyer-Ahmad Province, Iran. At the 2006 census, its population was 387, in 77 families.
