= Deh Shirin-e Badengan =

Deh Shirin-e Badengan ده شيرين بادنگان
- Village
- Location within Iran
- Coordinates: 30°58′02″N 51°18′31″E
- Country: Iran
- Province: Kohgiluyeh and Boyer-Ahmad
- County: Dana
- Bakhsh: Pataveh
- Rural District: Pataveh

Population (2006)
  - Total: 264
- Time zone: UTC+3:30 (IRST)
  - Summer (DST): UTC+4:30 (IRDT)

Deh Shirin-e Badengan (Persian: ده شيرين بادنگان, also Romanized as Deh Shīrīn-e Bādengān; also known as Deh Shīrīn) is a village in Pataveh Rural District, Pataveh District, Dana County, Kohgiluyeh and Boyer-Ahmad Province, Iran. At the 2006 census, its population was 264, in 48 families.
