= Nadeh Gandi Khuri =

Nadeh Gandi Khuri نده گندي خوري
- Village
- Location within Iran
- Coordinates: 30°54′25″N 51°17′26″E
- Country: Iran
- Province: Kohgiluyeh and Boyer-Ahmad
- County: Dana
- Bakhsh: Central
- Rural District: Tut-e Nadeh

Population (2006)
  - Total: 216
- Time zone: UTC+3:30 (IRST)
  - Summer (DST): UTC+4:30 (IRDT)

Nadeh Gandi Khuri (Persian: نده گندي خوري, also Romanized as Nadeh Gandī khūrī; also known as Gandī Khūrī) is a village in Tut-e Nadeh Rural District, in the Central District of Dana County, Kohgiluyeh and Boyer-Ahmad Province, Iran. At the 2006 census, its population was 216, in 45 families.
