= Pey Abzar =

Pey Abzar پي ابزار
- Village
- Location within Iran
- Coordinates: 30°57′32″N 51°18′45″E
- Country: Iran
- Province: Kohgiluyeh and Boyer-Ahmad
- County: Dana
- Bakhsh: Central
- Rural District: Tut-e Nadeh

Population (2006)
  - Total: 181
- Time zone: UTC+3:30 (IRST)
  - Summer (DST): UTC+4:30 (IRDT)

Pey Abzar (Persian: پي ابزار, also Romanized as Pey Ābzār; also known as Pey Ābzā) is a village in Tut-e Nadeh Rural District, in the Central District of Dana County, Kohgiluyeh and Boyer-Ahmad Province, Iran. At the 2006 census, its population was 181, in 38 families.
