= Mirza Qoli-ye Bahram Beygi =

Mirza Qoli-ye Bahram Beygi ميرزاقلي بهرام بيگي
- Village
- Location within Iran
- Coordinates: 30°59′00″N 51°10′00″E
- Country: Iran
- Province: Kohgiluyeh and Boyer-Ahmad
- County: Dana
- Bakhsh: Pataveh
- Rural District: Pataveh

Population (2006)
  - Total: 168
- Time zone: UTC+3:30 (IRST)
  - Summer (DST): UTC+4:30 (IRDT)

Mirza Qoli-ye Bahram Beygi (Persian: ميرزاقلي بهرام بيگي, also Romanized as Mīrzā Qolī-ye Bahrām Beygī; also known as Mīrzā Qolī) is a village in Pataveh Rural District, Pataveh District, Dana County, Kohgiluyeh and Boyer-Ahmad Province, Iran. At the 2006 census, its population was 168, in 30 families.
