= Darshahi =

Darshahi دارشاهي
- Village
- Location within Iran
- Coordinates: 30°49′34″N 51°22′29″E
- Country: Iran
- Province: Kohgiluyeh and Boyer-Ahmad
- County: Dana
- Bakhsh: Central
- Rural District: Dana

Population (2006)
  - Total: 841
- Time zone: UTC+3:30 (IRST)
  - Summer (DST): UTC+4:30 (IRDT)

Darshahi (Persian: دارشاهي, also Romanized as Dārshāhī) is a village in Dana Rural District, in the Central District of Dana County, Kohgiluyeh and Boyer-Ahmad Province, Iran. At the 2006 census, its population was 841, in 187 families.
