= Bakaludun-e Shabliz =

Bakaludun-e Shabliz بكلودون شبليز
- Village
- Location within Iran
- Coordinates: 31°05′03″N 51°03′13″E
- Country: Iran
- Province: Kohgiluyeh and Boyer-Ahmad
- County: Dana
- Bakhsh: Pataveh
- Rural District: Pataveh

Population (2006)
  - Total: 38
- Time zone: UTC+3:30 (IRST)
  - Summer (DST): UTC+4:30 (IRDT)

Bakaludun-e Shabliz (Persian: بكلودون شبليز, also Romanized as Bakalūdūn-e Shablīz; also known as Balkehdūn) is a village in Pataveh Rural District, Pataveh District, Dana County, Kohgiluyeh and Boyer-Ahmad Province, Iran. At the 2006 census, its population was 38, in 7 families.
