= Kowkhdan =

Kowkhdan كوخدان
- Village
- Location within Iran
- Coordinates: 30°49′52″N 51°29′03″E
- Country: Iran
- Province: Kohgiluyeh and Boyer-Ahmad
- County: Dana
- Bakhsh: Central
- Rural District: Dana

Population (2006)
  - Total: 379
- Time zone: UTC+3:30 (IRST)
  - Summer (DST): UTC+4:30 (IRDT)

Kowkhdan (Persian: كوخدان, also Romanized as Kowkhdān; also known as Kokhdān and Kokhedān) is a village in Dana Rural District, in the Central District of Dana County, Kohgiluyeh and Boyer-Ahmad Province, Iran. At the 2006 census, its population was 379, in 93 families.
