= Darreh Chenari-ye Kareyak =

Darreh Chenari-ye Kareyak دره چناري كريك
- Village
- Country: Iran
- Province: Kohgiluyeh and Boyer-Ahmad
- County: Dana
- Bakhsh: Central
- Rural District: Dana

Population (2006)
  - Total: 37
- Time zone: UTC+3:30 (IRST)
  - Summer (DST): UTC+4:30 (IRDT)

Darreh Chenari-ye Kareyak (Persian: دره چناري كريك, also Romanized as Darreh Chenārī-ye Kareyak) is a village in Dana Rural District, in the Central District of Dana County, Kohgiluyeh and Boyer-Ahmad Province, Iran. At the 2006 census, its population was 37, in 9 families.
