= Cham Arabi-ye Pataveh =

Cham Arabi-ye Pataveh چم عربي پاتاوه
- Village
- Location within Iran
- Coordinates: 30°56′23″N 51°15′50″E
- Country: Iran
- Province: Kohgiluyeh and Boyer-Ahmad
- County: Dana
- Bakhsh: Pataveh
- Rural District: Pataveh

Population (2006)
  - Total: 145
- Time zone: UTC+3:30 (IRST)
  - Summer (DST): UTC+4:30 (IRDT)

Cham Arabi-ye Pataveh (Persian: چم عربي پاتاوه, also Romanized as Cham ‘Arabī-ye Pātāveh; also known as Cham ‘Arabī and Cham Gharbī) is a village in Pataveh Rural District, Pataveh District, Dana County, Kohgiluyeh and Boyer-Ahmad Province, Iran. At the 2006 census, its population was 145, in 23 families.
