= Chat Kuh-e Bahram Beygi =

Chat Kuh-e Bahram Beygi چاتكوه بهرام بيگي
- Village
- Location within Iran
- Coordinates: 30°59′06″N 51°11′26″E
- Country: Iran
- Province: Kohgiluyeh and Boyer-Ahmad
- County: Dana
- Bakhsh: Pataveh
- Rural District: Pataveh

Population (2006)
  - Total: 78
- Time zone: UTC+3:30 (IRST)
  - Summer (DST): UTC+4:30 (IRDT)

Chat Kuh-e Bahram Beygi (Persian: چاتكوه بهرام بيگي, also Romanized as Chāt Kūh-e Bahrām Beygī; also known as Chāt Kū and Chāt Kūh) is a village in Pataveh Rural District, Pataveh District, Dana County, Kohgiluyeh and Boyer-Ahmad Province, Iran. At the 2006 census, its population was 78, in 15 families.
