= Margh-e Chenar =

Margh-e Chenar مرغ چنار
- Village
- Location within Iran
- Coordinates: 31°09′48″N 51°11′39″E
- Country: Iran
- Province: Kohgiluyeh and Boyer-Ahmad
- County: Dana
- Bakhsh: Pataveh
- Rural District: Sadat Mahmudi

Population (2006)
  - Total: 88
- Time zone: UTC+3:30 (IRST)
  - Summer (DST): UTC+4:30 (IRDT)

Margh-e Chenar (Persian: مرغ چنار, also Romanized as Margh-e Chenār) is a village in Sadat Mahmudi Rural District, Pataveh District, Dana County, Kohgiluyeh and Boyer-Ahmad Province, Iran. At the 2006 census, its population was 88, in 16 families.
