= Mirza Bahram Beygi =

Mirza Bahram Beygi ميرزابهرام بيگي
- Village
- Country: Iran
- Province: Kohgiluyeh and Boyer-Ahmad
- County: Dana
- Bakhsh: Pataveh
- Rural District: Pataveh

Population (2006)
  - Total: 77
- Time zone: UTC+3:30 (IRST)
  - Summer (DST): UTC+4:30 (IRDT)

Mirza Bahram Beygi (Persian: ميرزابهرام بيگي, also Romanized as Mīrzā Bahrām Beygī) is a village in Pataveh Rural District, Pataveh District, Dana County, Kohgiluyeh and Boyer-Ahmad Province, Iran. At the 2006 census, its population was 77, in 20 families.
