= Pey Zard-e Bahram Beygi-ye Olya =

Pey Zard-e Bahram Beygi-ye Olya پي زردبهرام بيگي عليا
- Village
- Country: Iran
- Province: Kohgiluyeh and Boyer-Ahmad
- County: Dana
- Bakhsh: Pataveh
- Rural District: Pataveh

Population (2006)
  - Total: 190
- Time zone: UTC+3:30 (IRST)
  - Summer (DST): UTC+4:30 (IRDT)

Pey Zard-e Bahram Beygi-ye Olya (Persian: پي زردبهرام بيگي عليا, also Romanized as Pay Zard-e Bahrām Beygī-ye ‘Olyā) is a village in Pataveh Rural District, Pataveh District, Dana County, Kohgiluyeh and Boyer-Ahmad Province, Iran. At the 2006 census, its population was 190, in 38 families.
