= Sirun-e Shabliz =

Sirun-e Shabliz سيرون شبليز
- Village
- Location within Iran
- Coordinates: 31°07′06″N 51°00′38″E
- Country: Iran
- Province: Kohgiluyeh and Boyer-Ahmad
- County: Dana
- Bakhsh: Pataveh
- Rural District: Pataveh

Population (2006)
  - Total: 33
- Time zone: UTC+3:30 (IRST)
  - Summer (DST): UTC+4:30 (IRDT)

Sirun-e Shabliz (Persian: سيرون شبليز, also Romanized as Sīrūn-e Shablīz; also known as Sīrūn) is a village in Pataveh Rural District, Pataveh District, Dana County, Kohgiluyeh and Boyer-Ahmad Province, Iran. At the 2006 census, its population was 33, in 8 families.
