= Bahram Beygi-ye Olya Samandi =

Bahram Beygi-ye Olya Samandi بهرام بيگي علياسمندي
- Village
- Location within Iran
- Coordinates: 30°58′57″N 51°11′48″E
- Country: Iran
- Province: Kohgiluyeh and Boyer-Ahmad
- County: Dana
- Bakhsh: Pataveh
- Rural District: Pataveh

Population (2006)
  - Total: 921
- Time zone: UTC+3:30 (IRST)
  - Summer (DST): UTC+4:30 (IRDT)

Bahram Beygi-ye Olya Samandi (Persian: بهرام بيگي علياسمندي, also Romanized as Bahrām Beygī-ye ‘Olyā Samandī; also known as Bahrāmbeygī) is a village in Pataveh Rural District, Pataveh District, Dana County, Kohgiluyeh and Boyer-Ahmad Province, Iran. At the 2006 census, its population was 921, in 169 families.
