= Sineh Namak =

Sineh Namak سينه نمك
- Village
- Location within Iran
- Coordinates: 31°12′15″N 51°14′16″E
- Country: Iran
- Province: Kohgiluyeh and Boyer-Ahmad
- County: Dana
- Bakhsh: Pataveh
- Rural District: Sadat Mahmudi

Population (2006)
  - Total: 18
- Time zone: UTC+3:30 (IRST)
  - Summer (DST): UTC+4:30 (IRDT)

Sineh Namak (Persian: سينه نمك, also Romanized as Sīneh Namak) is a village in Sadat Mahmudi Rural District, Pataveh District, Dana County, Kohgiluyeh and Boyer-Ahmad Province, Iran. At the 2006 census, its population was 18, in 5 families.
