= Chal Badam-e Kata =

Chal Badam-e Kata چال بادام كتا
- Village
- Location within Iran
- Coordinates: 31°11′23″N 51°15′12″E
- Country: Iran
- Province: Kohgiluyeh and Boyer-Ahmad
- County: Dana
- Bakhsh: Pataveh
- Rural District: Sadat Mahmudi

Population (2006)
  - Total: 39
- Time zone: UTC+3:30 (IRST)
  - Summer (DST): UTC+4:30 (IRDT)

Chal Badam-e Kata (Persian: چال بادام كتا, also Romanized as Chāl Bādām-e Katā; also known as Chāleh Bādām) is a village in Sadat Mahmudi Rural District, Pataveh District, Dana County, Kohgiluyeh and Boyer-Ahmad Province, Iran. At the 2006 census, its population was 39, in 7 families.
