= Choqeh-ye Sorkh-e Bahram Beygi =

Choqeh-ye Sorkh-e Bahram Beygi چقه سرخ بهرام بيگي
- Village
- Location within Iran
- Coordinates: 30°58′51″N 51°12′12″E
- Country: Iran
- Province: Kohgiluyeh and Boyer-Ahmad
- County: Dana
- Bakhsh: Pataveh
- Rural District: Pataveh

Population (2006)
  - Total: 28
- Time zone: UTC+3:30 (IRST)
  - Summer (DST): UTC+4:30 (IRDT)

Choqeh-ye Sorkh-e Bahram Beygi (Persian: چقه سرخ بهرام بيگي, also Romanized as Choqeh-ye Sorkh-e Bahrām Beygī; also known as Choqeh-ye Sorkh) is a village in Pataveh Rural District, Pataveh District, Dana County, Kohgiluyeh and Boyer-Ahmad Province, Iran. At the 2006 census, its population was 28, in 5 families.
