= Gur-e Ganju =

Gur-e Ganju گورگنجو
- Village
- Location within Iran
- Coordinates: 30°55′16″N 51°17′54″E
- Country: Iran
- Province: Kohgiluyeh and Boyer-Ahmad
- County: Dana
- Bakhsh: Central
- Rural District: Tut-e Nadeh

Population (2006)
  - Total: 469
- Time zone: UTC+3:30 (IRST)
  - Summer (DST): UTC+4:30 (IRDT)

Gur-e Ganju (Persian: گورگنجو, also Romanized as Gūr-e Ganjū and Gūr Ganjū; also known as Gowd-e Ganjū and Gūr Ganjeh) is a village in Tut-e Nadeh Rural District, in the Central District of Dana County, Kohgiluyeh and Boyer-Ahmad Province, Iran. At the 2006 census, its population was 469, in 100 families.
