= Do Rah-e Ghomashkeh =

Do Rah-e Ghomashkeh دوراه غماشكه
- Village
- Location within Iran
- Coordinates: 31°07′00″N 51°08′32″E
- Country: Iran
- Province: Kohgiluyeh and Boyer-Ahmad
- County: Dana
- Bakhsh: Pataveh
- Rural District: Sadat Mahmudi

Population (2006)
  - Total: 490
- Time zone: UTC+3:30 (IRST)
  - Summer (DST): UTC+4:30 (IRDT)

Do Rah-e Ghomashkeh (Persian: دوراه غماشكه, also Romanized as Do Rāh-e Ghomāshkeh; also known as Do Rāh) is a village in Sadat Mahmudi Rural District, Pataveh District, Dana County, Kohgiluyeh and Boyer-Ahmad Province, Iran. At the 2006 census, its population was 490, in 109 families.
