= Bon Zard =

Bon Zard (Persian: بن زرد) may refer to:

- Bon Zard, Fars
- Bon Zard, Kerman
- Bon Zard-e Olya, Kohgiluyeh and Boyer-Ahmad Province
- Bon Zard-e Sofla, Kohgiluyeh and Boyer-Ahmad Province
