= Kalleh Sur-e Shabliz =

Kalleh Sur-e Shabliz كهله شورشبليز
- Village
- Location within Iran
- Coordinates: 31°06′20″N 51°01′49″E
- Country: Iran
- Province: Kohgiluyeh and Boyer-Ahmad
- County: Dana
- Bakhsh: Pataveh
- Rural District: Pataveh

Population (2006)
  - Total: 61
- Time zone: UTC+3:30 (IRST)
  - Summer (DST): UTC+4:30 (IRDT)

Kalleh Sur-e Shabliz (Persian: كهله شورشبليز, also Romanized as Kalleh Sūr-e Shablīz; also known as Kalleh Sūr) is a village in Pataveh Rural District, Pataveh District, Dana County, Kohgiluyeh and Boyer-Ahmad Province, Iran. At the 2006 census, its population was 61, in 12 families.
