= Semerun =

Semerun سمرون
- Village
- Location within Iran
- Coordinates: 30°55′45″N 51°17′19″E
- Country: Iran
- Province: Kohgiluyeh and Boyer-Ahmad
- County: Dana
- Bakhsh: Central
- Rural District: Tut-e Nadeh

Population (2006)
  - Total: 583
- Time zone: UTC+3:30 (IRST)
  - Summer (DST): UTC+4:30 (IRDT)

Semerun (Persian: سمرون, also Romanized as Semerūn and Semrun; also known as Semīrūn and Sīmerūn) is a village in Tut-e Nadeh Rural District, in the Central District of Dana County, Kohgiluyeh and Boyer-Ahmad Province, Iran. At the 2006 census, its population was 583, in 124 families.
