= Gol-e Chaharabad-e Sadat Mahmudi =

Gol-e Chaharabad-e Sadat Mahmudi گل چهرابادسادات محمودي
- Village
- Location within Iran
- Coordinates: 31°04′53″N 51°10′38″E
- Country: Iran
- Province: Kohgiluyeh and Boyer-Ahmad
- County: Dana
- Bakhsh: Pataveh
- Rural District: Sadat Mahmudi

Population (2006)
  - Total: 115
- Time zone: UTC+3:30 (IRST)
  - Summer (DST): UTC+4:30 (IRDT)

Gol-e Chaharabad-e Sadat Mahmudi (Persian: گل چهرابادسادات محمودي, also Romanized as Gol-e Chaharābād-e Sādāt Maḩmūdī; also known as Gol-e Chaharābād) is a village in Sadat Mahmudi Rural District, Pataveh District, Dana County, Kohgiluyeh and Boyer-Ahmad Province, Iran. At the 2006 census, its population was 115, in 21 families.
