= Tang Ravaq =

Tang Ravaq تنگرواق
- Village
- Location within Iran
- Coordinates: 31°02′19″N 51°14′20″E
- Country: Iran
- Province: Kohgiluyeh and Boyer-Ahmad
- County: Dana
- Bakhsh: Pataveh
- Rural District: Pataveh

Population (2006)
  - Total: 613
- Time zone: UTC+3:30 (IRST)
  - Summer (DST): UTC+4:30 (IRDT)

Tang Ravaq (Persian: تنگرواق, also Romanized as Tang-e Ravāq and Tang Ravāq) is a village in Pataveh Rural District, Pataveh District, Dana County, Kohgiluyeh and Boyer-Ahmad Province, Iran. At the 2006 census, its population was 613, in 132 families. Near Tang Ravaq is the Lama Historical Cemetery, with burials dating to the Bronze Age.
