= Bizhgan =

Bizhgan (Persian: بيژگن) may refer to:

- Bizhgan, Chaharmahal and Bakhtiari
- Bizhgan, Kohgiluyeh and Boyer-Ahmad
