= Masumabad va Aliabad-e Kareyak =

Village in Kohgiluyeh and Boyer-Ahmad province, Iran

Masumabad va Aliabad-e Kareyak Persian: معصوم‌آباد و علی‌آباد کریک
- Village
- Location within Iran
- Coordinates: 30°49′14″N 51°25′10″E
- Country: Iran
- Province: Kohgiluyeh and Boyer-Ahmad
- County: Dana
- District: Central
- Rural District: Dana

Population (2016)
  - Total: 1,004
- Time zone: UTC+3:30 (IRST)

Masumabad va Aliabad-e Kareyak (Persian: معصوم‌آباد و علی‌آباد کریک) is a village in Dana Rural District of the Central District of Dana County, Kohgiluyeh and Boyer-Ahmad province, Iran.

== Demographics ==
=== Population ===
At the time of the 2006 National Census, the village's population was 753 in 177 households. The following census in 2011 counted 979 people in 258 households. The 2016 census measured the population of the village as 1,004 people in 272 households. It was the most populous village in its rural district.
