= Kareyak, Kohgiluyeh and Boyer-Ahmad =

Village in Kohgiluyeh and Boyer-Ahmad province, Iran

Karyak Persian: کریک
- Village
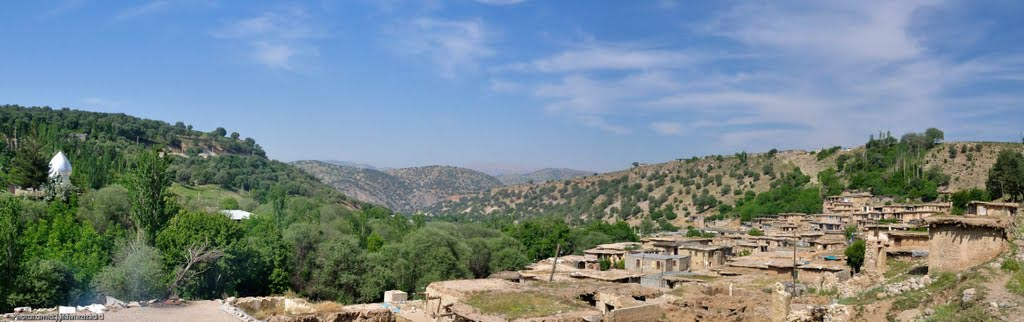
- Panorama of Kareyak village

- Location within Iran
- Coordinates: 30°48′42″N 51°24′58″E
- Country: Iran
- Province: Kohgiluyeh and Boyer-Ahmad
- County: Dana
- District: Central
- Rural District: Dana

Population (2016)
  - Total: 635
- Time zone: UTC+3:30 (IRST)

Karyak (Persian: کریک) (Note: Also romanized as Karīak) is a village in, and the capital of, Dana Rural District of the Central District of Dana County, Kohgiluyeh and Boyer-Ahmad province, Iran.

== Demographics ==
=== Population ===
At the time of the 2006 National Census, the village's population was 786 in 195 households. The following census in 2011 counted 751 people in 215 households. The 2016 census measured the population of the village as 635 people in 193 households.
