= Badengan =

Badengan (Persian: بادنگان), also rendered as Badangun or Badengun or Bademgum, may refer to:

- Badengan-e Olya
- Badengan-e Sofla
