= Bon Zard-e Olya =

Bon Zard-e Olya بن زردعليا
- Village
- Location within Iran
- Coordinates: 31°01′22″N 51°16′29″E
- Country: Iran
- Province: Kohgiluyeh and Boyer-Ahmad
- County: Dana
- Bakhsh: Pataveh
- Rural District: Pataveh

Population (2006)
  - Total: 603
- Time zone: UTC+3:30 (IRST)
  - Summer (DST): UTC+4:30 (IRDT)

Bon Zard-e Olya (Persian: بن زردعليا, also Romanized as Bon Zard-e ‘Olyā and Bon Zard ‘Olyā; also known as Bon Zard and Bon Zard-e Bālā) is a village in Pataveh Rural District, Pataveh District, Dana County, Kohgiluyeh and Boyer-Ahmad Province, Iran. At the 2006 census, its population was 603, in 126 families.
