= Sar Tang-e Deh Kohneh Hamidabad =

Sar Tang-e Deh Kohneh Hamidabad سرتنگ ده كهنه حميداباد
- Village
- Location within Iran
- Coordinates: 30°57′50″N 51°19′21″E
- Country: Iran
- Province: Kohgiluyeh and Boyer-Ahmad
- County: Dana
- Bakhsh: Pataveh
- Rural District: Pataveh

Population (2006)
  - Total: 38
- Time zone: UTC+3:30 (IRST)
  - Summer (DST): UTC+4:30 (IRDT)

Sar Tang-e Deh Kohneh Hamidabad (Persian: سرتنگ ده كهنه حميداباد, also Romanized as Sar Tang-e Deh Kohneh Ḩāmīdābād; also known as Āb Zār, Sar Tang, and Sar Tang-e Āb Zā) is a village in Pataveh Rural District, Pataveh District, Dana County, Kohgiluyeh and Boyer-Ahmad Province, Iran. At the 2006 census, its population was 38, in 7 families.
