= Sartang-e Ravaq =

Sartang-e Ravaq سرتنگ رواق
- Village
- Location within Iran
- Coordinates: 31°02′47″N 51°15′24″E
- Country: Iran
- Province: Kohgiluyeh and Boyer-Ahmad
- County: Dana
- Bakhsh: Pataveh
- Rural District: Pataveh

Population (2006)
  - Total: 103
- Time zone: UTC+3:30 (IRST)
  - Summer (DST): UTC+4:30 (IRDT)

Sartang-e Ravaq (Persian: سرتنگ رواق, also Romanized as Sartang-e Ravāq) is a village in Pataveh Rural District, Pataveh District, Dana County, Kohgiluyeh and Boyer-Ahmad Province, Iran. At the 2006 census, its population was 103, in 21 families.
