= Dozdak, Dana =

Village in Kohgiluyeh and Boyer-Ahmad province, Iran

Dozdak Persian: دزدک
- Village
- Location within Iran
- Coordinates: 30°50′07″N 50°30′20″E
- Country: Iran
- Province: Kohgiluyeh and Boyer-Ahmad
- County: Dana
- District: Pataveh
- Rural District: Sadat Mahmudi

Population (2016)
  - Total: 447
- Time zone: UTC+3:30 (IRST)

Dozdak (Persian: دزدک) is a village in, and the capital of, Sadat Mahmudi Rural District of Pataveh District, Dana County, Kohgiluyeh and Boyer-Ahmad province, Iran.

== Demographics ==
=== Population ===
At the time of the 2006 National Census, the village's population was 399 in 80 households. The following census in 2011 counted 414 people in 101 households. The 2016 census measured the population of the village as 447 people in 122 households.
