= Badengan-e Sofla =

Badengan-e Sofla بادنگان سفلي
- Village
- Location within Iran
- Coordinates: 30°58′31″N 51°14′41″E
- Country: Iran
- Province: Kohgiluyeh and Boyer-Ahmad
- County: Dana
- Bakhsh: Pataveh
- Rural District: Pataveh

Population (2006)
  - Total: 235
- Time zone: UTC+3:30 (IRST)
  - Summer (DST): UTC+4:30 (IRDT)

Badengan-e Sofla (Persian: بادنگان سفلي, also Romanized as Bādengān-e Soflá; also known as Bādangūn-e Pā’īn, Bādengān-e Pā’īn, and Bādengūn Soflá) is a village in Pataveh Rural District, Pataveh District, Dana County, Kohgiluyeh and Boyer-Ahmad Province, Iran. At the 2006 census, its population was 235, in 47 families.
