= Meymand, Kohgiluyeh and Boyer-Ahmad =

Village in Kohgiluyeh and Boyer-Ahmad province, Iran

Meymand Persian: ميمند
- Village
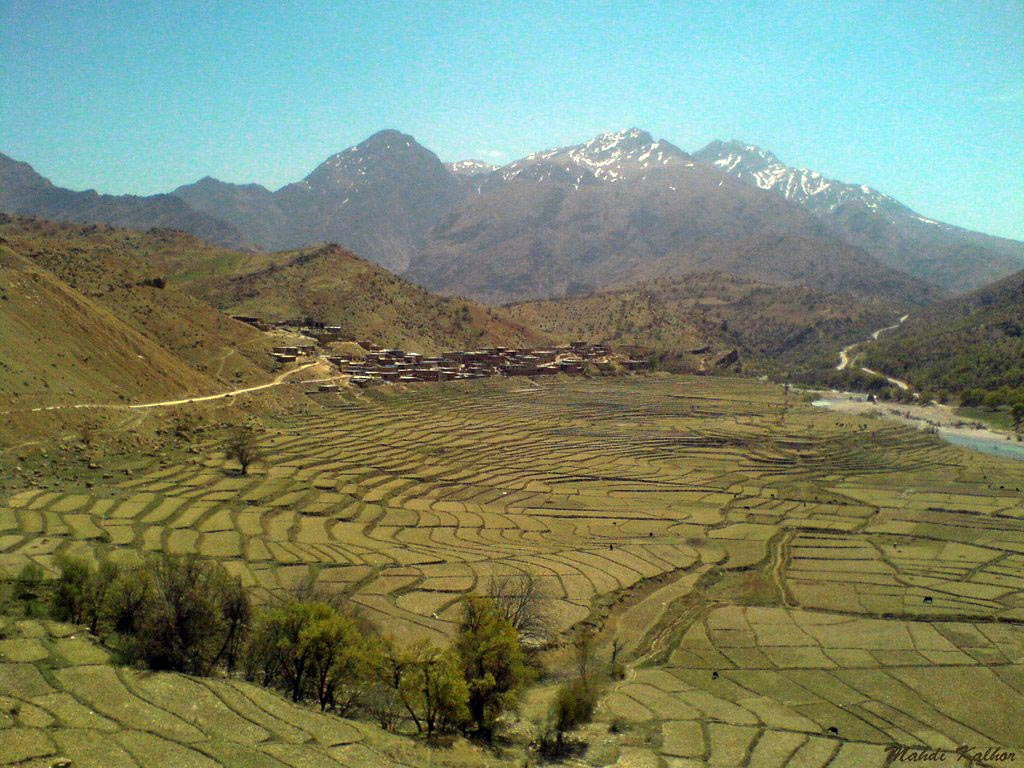
- The village of Meymand, Dana County

- Location within Iran
- Coordinates: 31°08′50″N 51°16′02″E
- Country: Iran
- Province: Kohgiluyeh and Boyer-Ahmad
- County: Dana
- District: Pataveh
- Rural District: Sadat Mahmudi

Population (2016)
  - Total: 1,463
- Time zone: UTC+3:30 (IRST)

Meymand (Persian: ميمند) (Note: Also romanized as Maimand) is a village in Sadat Mahmudi Rural District of Pataveh District, Dana County, Kohgiluyeh and Boyer-Ahmad province, Iran.

== Demographics ==
=== Population ===
At the time of the 2006 National Census, the village's population was 1,446 in 313 households. The following census in 2011 counted 1,504 people in 366 households. The 2016 census measured the population of the village as 1,463 people in 416 households. It was the most populous village in its rural district.
