= Tall Gah =

Tall Gah (Persian: تل گه or تل گاه) may refer to:

- Tall Gah, Boyer-Ahmad (تل گه - Tall Gah)
- Tall Gah, Dana (تل گاه - Tall Gāh)
