= Dera =

Dera or DERA may refer to:

== Businesses and organisations ==
- Defence Evaluation and Research Agency, part of the UK Ministry of Defence 1995–2001
- Downtown Eastside Residents Association in Vancouver, British Columbia, Canada 1973–2010
- Dera (organization), a socio-religious organization in northern India
- Deutsche Rohstoffagentur (German Natural Resources Agency), section of Federal Institute for Geosciences and Natural Resources

== Places ==
=== Ethiopia ===
- Dera, Ethiopia
- Dera, Amhara (woreda)
- Dera, Oromia

=== India ===
- Dera Gopipur, Himachal Pradesh, known during the British Raj as Dera
- Dera (village) in South Delhi district.

=== Iran ===
- Dera, Iran, in Kerman Province
- Dera, Kohgiluyeh and Boyer-Ahmad

== Other uses ==
- dera, a component of some placenames in South Asia
- Dera language, a Senagi language of Papua New Guinea and Indonesia
- Kanakuru language, or Dera, in Nigeria
- Charles Dera (born 1978), American pornographic actor
- Defense-Independent ERA, a baseball statistic
- Diesel Emissions Reduction Act, American legislation

== See also ==
- Daraa, a city in Syria
- Deira, an area of post-Roman Britain
- Deira, Dubai, a district in the UAE
- Dera Sacha Sauda, an Indian religious cult
