= Tal-e Gavi =

Tal-e Gavi تل گاوي
- Village
- Location within Iran
- Coordinates: 30°47′12″N 51°25′14″E
- Country: Iran
- Province: Kohgiluyeh and Boyer-Ahmad
- County: Dana
- Bakhsh: Central
- Rural District: Dana

Population (2006)
  - Total: 118
- Time zone: UTC+3:30 (IRST)
  - Summer (DST): UTC+4:30 (IRDT)

Tal-e Gavi (Persian: تل گاوي, also Romanized as Tal-e Gāvī and Tall-e Gāvī; also known as Tall Gāh) is a village in Dana Rural District, in the Central District of Dana County, Kohgiluyeh and Boyer-Ahmad Province, Iran. At the 2006 census, its population was 118, in 30 families.
