= Sartal-e Dingu =

Sartal-e Dingu سرتل دينگو
- Village
- Location within Iran
- Coordinates: 31°05′27″N 51°09′34″E
- Country: Iran
- Province: Kohgiluyeh and Boyer-Ahmad
- County: Dana
- Bakhsh: Pataveh
- Rural District: Sadat Mahmudi

Population (2006)
  - Total: 138
- Time zone: UTC+3:30 (IRST)
  - Summer (DST): UTC+4:30 (IRDT)

Sartal-e Dingu (Persian: سرتل دينگو, also Romanized as Sartal-e Dīngū) is a village in Sadat Mahmudi Rural District, Pataveh District, Dana County, Kohgiluyeh and Boyer-Ahmad Province, Iran. At the 2006 census, its population was 138, in 30 families.
