= Tut-e Nadeh =

Village in Kohgiluyeh and Boyer-Ahmad province, Iran

Tut-e Nadeh Persian: توت نده
- Village
- Location within Iran
- Coordinates: 30°53′09″N 51°20′13″E
- Country: Iran
- Province: Kohgiluyeh and Boyer-Ahmad
- County: Dana
- District: Central
- Rural District: Tut-e Nadeh

Population (2016)
  - Total: 1,510
- Time zone: UTC+3:30 (IRST)

Tut-e Nadeh (Persian: توت نده) (Note: Also romanized as Tūt Nadeh and Tūt-e Nadeh) is a village in, and the capital of, Tut-e Nadeh Rural District of the Central District of Dana County, Kohgiluyeh and Boyer-Ahmad province, Iran.

== Demographics ==
=== Population ===
At the time of the 2006 National Census, the village's population was 1,600 in 353 households. The following census in 2011 counted 2,003 people in 489 households. The 2016 census measured the population of the village as 1,510 people in 431 households. It was the most populous village in its rural district.
