= Do Rah-e Bahram Beygi =

Do Rah-e Bahram Beygi دوراه بهرام بيگي
- Village
- Location within Iran
- Coordinates: 30°58′30″N 51°13′00″E
- Country: Iran
- Province: Kohgiluyeh and Boyer-Ahmad
- County: Dana
- Bakhsh: Pataveh
- Rural District: Pataveh

Population (2006)
  - Total: 35
- Time zone: UTC+3:30 (IRST)
  - Summer (DST): UTC+4:30 (IRDT)

Do Rah-e Bahram Beygi (Persian: دوراه بهرام بيگي, also Romanized as Do Rāh-e Bahrām Beygī; also known as Derā, Do Rāh, and Dorrā) is a village in Pataveh Rural District, Pataveh District, Dana County, Kohgiluyeh and Boyer-Ahmad Province, Iran. At the 2006 census, its population was 35, in 8 families.
