= Bon Zard-e Sofla =

Bon Zard-e Sofla بن زردسفلي
- Village
- Location within Iran
- Coordinates: 31°00′33″N 51°16′59″E
- Country: Iran
- Province: Kohgiluyeh and Boyer-Ahmad
- County: Dana
- Bakhsh: Pataveh
- Rural District: Pataveh

Population (2006)
  - Total: 883
- Time zone: UTC+3:30 (IRST)
  - Summer (DST): UTC+4:30 (IRDT)

Bon Zard-e Sofla (Persian: بن زردسفلي, also Romanized as Bon Zard-e Soflá and Bon Zard Soflá; also known as Bon Zard and Bon Zard-e Pā’īn) is a village in Pataveh Rural District, Pataveh District, Dana County, Kohgiluyeh and Boyer-Ahmad Province, Iran. At the 2006 census, its population was 883, in 192 families.
