= Sar Tang-e Tut-e Nadeh =

Sar Tang-e Tut-e Nadeh سرتنگ توتنده
- Village
- Location within Iran
- Coordinates: 30°53′11″N 51°19′01″E
- Country: Iran
- Province: Kohgiluyeh and Boyer-Ahmad
- County: Dana
- Bakhsh: Central
- Rural District: Tut-e Nadeh

Population (2006)
  - Total: 277
- Time zone: UTC+3:30 (IRST)
  - Summer (DST): UTC+4:30 (IRDT)

Sar Tang-e Tut-e Nadeh (Persian: سرتنگ توتنده, also Romanized as Sar Tang-e Tūt-e Nadeh; also known as Sar Tang, Sartang-e Pā’īn, and Sartang-e Soflá) is a village in Tut-e Nadeh Rural District, in the Central District of Dana County, Kohgiluyeh and Boyer-Ahmad Province, Iran. At the 2006 census, its population was 277, in 55 families.
