= Gendi Khori-ye Olya =

Gendi Khori-ye Olya گندي خوري عليا
- Village
- Location within Iran
- Coordinates: 30°52′38″N 51°20′31″E
- Country: Iran
- Province: Kohgiluyeh and Boyer-Ahmad
- County: Dana
- Bakhsh: Central
- Rural District: Tut-e Nadeh

Population (2006)
  - Total: 96
- Time zone: UTC+3:30 (IRST)
  - Summer (DST): UTC+4:30 (IRDT)

Gendi Khori-ye Olya (Persian: گندي خوري عليا, also Romanized as Gendī Khorī-ye ‘Olyā; also known as Gendī Khorī-ye Bālā) is a village in Tut-e Nadeh Rural District, in the Central District of Dana County, Kohgiluyeh and Boyer-Ahmad Province, Iran. At the 2006 census, its population was 96, in 17 families.
