= Sartang-e Tomanak =

Sartang-e Tomanak سرتنگ تمنك
- Village
- Location within Iran
- Coordinates: 30°59′55″N 51°13′59″E
- Country: Iran
- Province: Kohgiluyeh and Boyer-Ahmad
- County: Dana
- Bakhsh: Pataveh
- Rural District: Pataveh

Population (2006)
  - Total: 86
- Time zone: UTC+3:30 (IRST)
  - Summer (DST): UTC+4:30 (IRDT)

Sartang-e Tomanak (Persian: سرتنگ تمنك) is a village in Pataveh Rural District, Pataveh District, Dana County, Kohgiluyeh and Boyer-Ahmad Province, Iran. At the 2006 census, its population was 86, in 16 families.
