= Shotor Khun =

Shotor Khun شترخون
- Village
- Location within Iran
- Coordinates: 31°00′15″N 51°13′59″E
- Country: Iran
- Province: Kohgiluyeh and Boyer-Ahmad
- County: Dana
- Bakhsh: Pataveh
- Rural District: Pataveh

Population (2006)
  - Total: 288
- Time zone: UTC+3:30 (IRST)
  - Summer (DST): UTC+4:30 (IRDT)

Shotor Khun (Persian: شترخون, also Romanized as Shotor Khūn; also known as Shotor Khān) is a village in Pataveh Rural District, Pataveh District, Dana County, Kohgiluyeh and Boyer-Ahmad Province, Iran. At the 2006 census, its population was 288, in 60 families.
