= Mirza Ali Bahram Beygi =

Mirza Ali Bahram Beygi ميرزاعلي بهرام بيگي
- Village
- Location within Iran
- Coordinates: 30°59′17″N 51°09′59″E
- Country: Iran
- Province: Kohgiluyeh and Boyer-Ahmad
- County: Dana
- Bakhsh: Pataveh
- Rural District: Pataveh

Population (2006)
  - Total: 250
- Time zone: UTC+3:30 (IRST)
  - Summer (DST): UTC+4:30 (IRDT)

Mirza Ali Bahram Beygi (Persian: ميرزاعلي بهرام بيگي, also Romanized as Mīrzā ʿAlī Bahrām Beygī; also known as Sartol (Persian: سرتل ) and Sar Tall and Sartol) is a village in Pataveh Rural District, Pataveh District, Dana County, Kohgiluyeh and Boyer-Ahmad Province, Iran. At the 2006 census, its population was 250, in 48 families.
