= Badengan-e Olya =

Badengan-e Olya بادنگان عليا
- Village
- Location within Iran
- Coordinates: 30°58′31″N 51°18′04″E
- Country: Iran
- Province: Kohgiluyeh and Boyer-Ahmad
- County: Dana
- Bakhsh: Pataveh
- Rural District: Pataveh

Population (2006)
  - Total: 714
- Time zone: UTC+3:30 (IRST)
  - Summer (DST): UTC+4:30 (IRDT)

Badengan-e Olya (Persian: بادنگان عليا, also Romanized as Bādengān-e ‘Olyā; also known as Bādangūn-e Bālā, Bādemgūn-e ‘Olyā, Bādengān-e Bālā, Bādengūn-e ‘Olyā, and Bādengūn ‘Olyā) is a village in Pataveh Rural District, Pataveh District, Dana County, Kohgiluyeh and Boyer-Ahmad Province, Iran. At the 2006 census, its population was 714, in 141 families.
