= Sartang =

Sartang may refer to:

- Sartang River, in Russia
- Sartang language, native to India
- Sar Tang (disambiguation), various places in Iran
