= Tomanak-e Olya, Dana =

Village in Kohgiluyeh and Boyer-Ahmad province, Iran

Tomanak-e Olya Persian: تمنك عليا
- Village
- Location within Iran
- Coordinates: 30°59′42″N 51°12′54″E
- Country: Iran
- Province: Kohgiluyeh and Boyer-Ahmad
- County: Dana
- District: Pataveh
- Rural District: Pataveh

Population (2016)
  - Total: 1,707
- Time zone: UTC+3:30 (IRST)

Tomanak-e Olya (Persian: تمنك عليا) (Note: Also romanized as Tomanak-e ‘Olyā) is a village in Pataveh Rural District of Pataveh District, Dana County, Kohgiluyeh and Boyer-Ahmad province, Iran.

== Demographics ==
=== Population ===
At the time of the 2006 National Census, the village's population was 1,248 in 242 households. The following census in 2011 counted 1,775 people in 401 households. The 2016 census measured the population of the village as 1,707 people in 447 households. It was the most populous village in its rural district.
