= Shotor Khan =

Shotor Khan (Persian: شترخان) may refer to:

- Shotor Khun, Kohgiluyeh and Boyer-Ahmad
- Shotor Khan, Tehran
