= Sisakht =

City in Kohgiluyeh and Boyer-Ahmad province, Iran

Sisakht سی‌سخت
- City
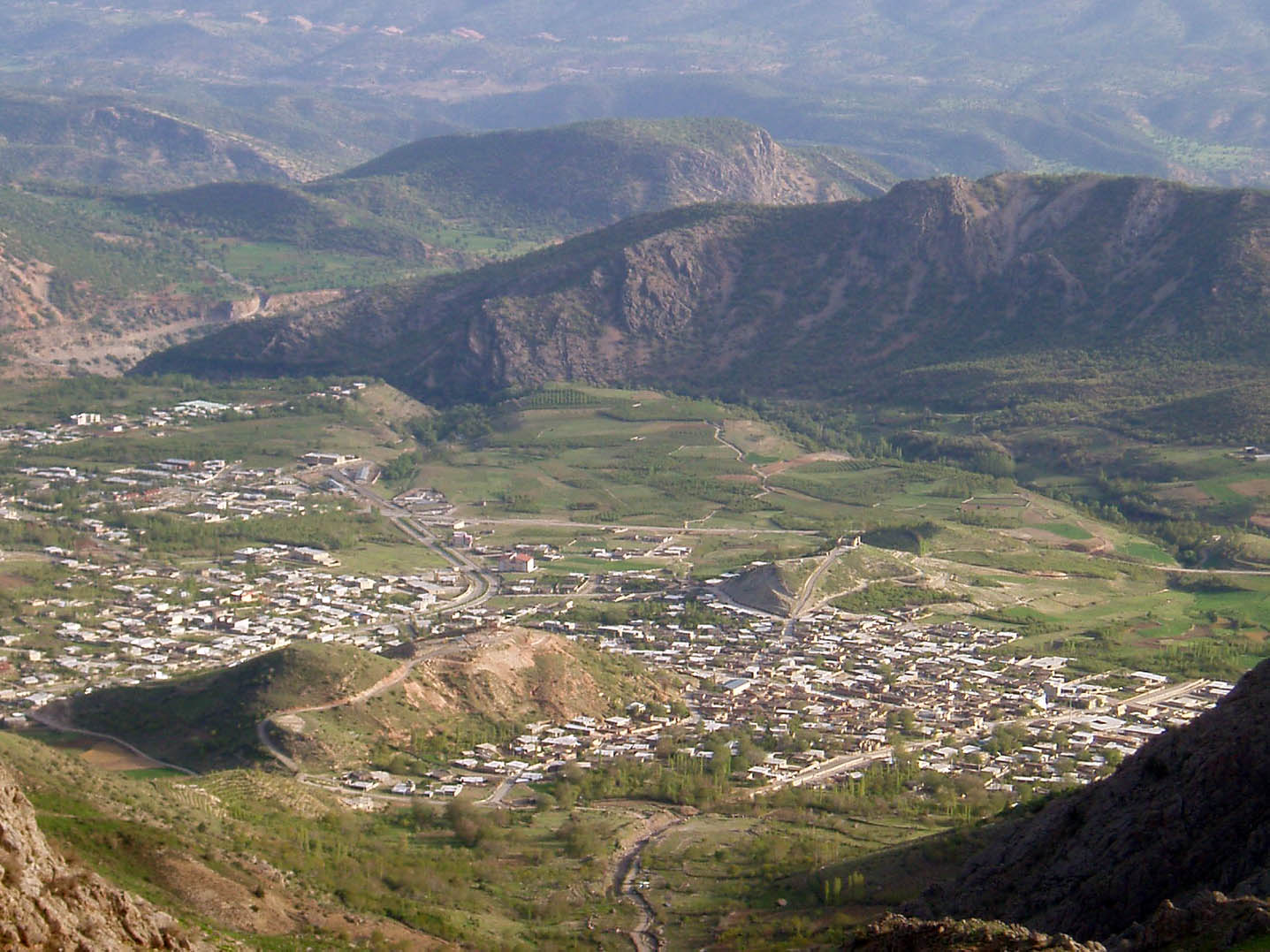

- Location within Iran
- Coordinates: 30°51′39″N 51°27′28″E
- Country: Iran
- Province: Kohgiluyeh and Boyer-Ahmad
- County: Dana
- District: Central

Population (2016)
  - Total: 7,855
- Time zone: UTC+3:30 (IRST)

Sisakht (Persian: سی‌سخت (Note: Also romanized as Sī Sakht and Sīsakht; (Northern Luri: سی‌سخت), romanized as SỉSext; also known as Deh Bozorg-e Sīsakht, Deh Bozorg-e Sīsākht, and Deh-e Bozorg Sīsakht) is a city in the Central District of Dana County, Kohgiluyeh and Boyer-Ahmad province, Iran, serving as capital of both the county and the district. Sisakht is in the foothills of the Zagros Mountains, 34 km from Yasuj, in the northern part of the province. The area of Dana is protected.

== History ==
Traces of ancient pottery have been found in excavations in Sisakht, as well as graves dating to c. 3000 BC. In Telespid, registered in the Iranian national heritage Organization list, there are traces of Sassanian and Safavid eras.

== Demographics ==
=== Language and ethnicity ===
Residents belong to Lur ethnic group and speak the Luri language.

=== Population ===
At the time of the 2006 National Census, the city's population was 6,342 in 1,528 households. The following census in 2011 counted 7,389 people in 1,852 households. The 2016 census measured the population of the city as 7,855 people in 2,200 households.

== Climate ==
Sisakht has a Mediterranean-influenced hot-summer humid continental climate (Dsa) according to the Köppen climate classification. The climate of the city of Sisakht is influenced by the cold Dena Mountains and is covered by snow in parts of the autumn and throughout the winter.

Climate data for Sisakht
Month	Jan	Feb	Mar	Apr	May	Jun	Jul	Aug	Sep	Oct	Nov	Dec	Year
Mean daily maximum °C (°F)	6.1 (43.0)	8.9 (48.0)	13.0 (55.4)	17.6 (63.7)	24.5 (76.1)	31.1 (88.0)	34.3 (93.7)	33.6 (92.5)	30.7 (87.3)	24.3 (75.7)	16.4 (61.5)	9.9 (49.8)	20.9 (69.6)
Mean daily minimum °C (°F)	−6.7 (19.9)	−3.9 (25.0)	−0.8 (30.6)	3.5 (38.3)	7.9 (46.2)	11.8 (53.2)	15.7 (60.3)	14.4 (57.9)	10.5 (50.9)	5.4 (41.7)	0.8 (33.4)	−3.1 (26.4)	4.6 (40.3)
Average precipitation mm (inches)	57 (2.2)	45 (1.8)	47 (1.9)	32 (1.3)	12 (0.5)	1 (0.0)	2 (0.1)	1 (0.0)	0 (0)	4 (0.2)	23 (0.9)	47 (1.9)	271 (10.7)
Source: Climate-data.org
