= Pataveh =

City in Kohgiluyeh and Boyer-Ahmad province, Iran

Pataveh Persian: پاتاوه
- City
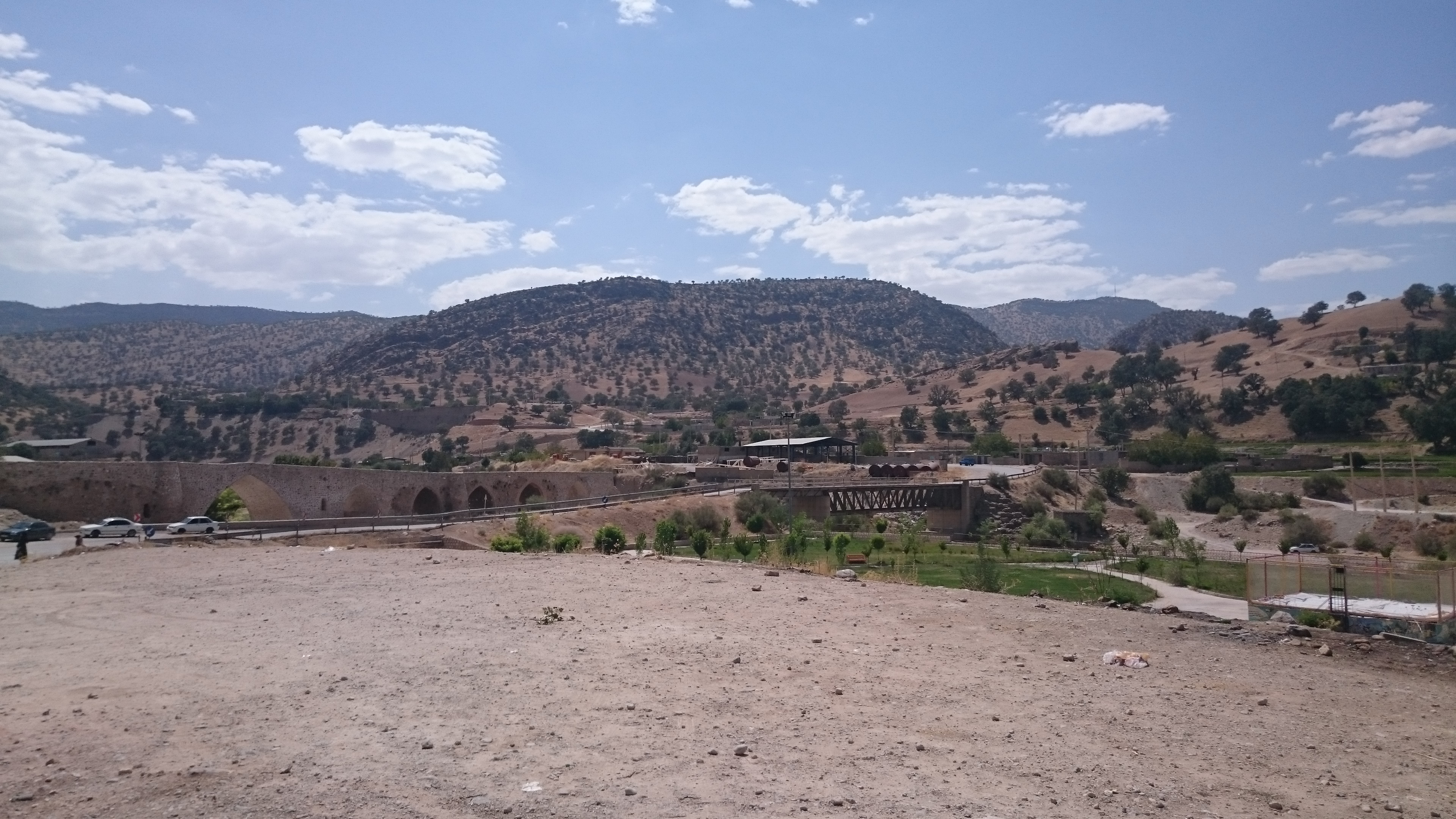
- The city of Pataveh

- Location within Iran
- Coordinates: 30°57′19″N 51°16′04″E
- Country: Iran
- Province: Kohgiluyeh and Boyer-Ahmad
- County: Dana
- District: Pataveh

Population (2016)
  - Total: 2,284
- Time zone: UTC+3:30 (IRST)

Pataveh (Persian: پاتاوه) (Note: Also romanized as Pātāveh, Pāţāveh, and Pataweh) is a city in, and the capital of, Pataveh District of Dana County, Kohgiluyeh and Boyer-Ahmad province, Iran. It also serves as the administrative center for Pataveh Rural District.

== Demographics ==
=== Population ===
At the time of the 2006 National Census, Pataveh's population was 1,925 in 377 households, when it was a village in Pataveh Rural District. The following census in 2011 counted 2,314 people in 522 households, by which time the village had been elevated to the status of a city. The 2016 census measured the population of the city as 2,284 people in 629 households.

== See also ==
- Arrajan
