= Sar Tang-e Bala =

Sar Tang-e Bala سرتنگ بالا
- Village
- Location within Iran
- Coordinates: 28°25′52″N 55°04′20″E
- Country: Iran
- Province: Fars
- County: Darab
- Bakhsh: Rostaq
- Rural District: Rostaq

Population (2006)
  - Total: 58
- Time zone: UTC+3:30 (IRST)
  - Summer (DST): UTC+4:30 (IRDT)

Sar Tang-e Bala (Persian: سرتنگ بالا, also Romanized as Sar Tang-e Bālā) is a village in Rostaq Rural District, Rostaq District, Darab County, Fars province, Iran. At the 2006 census, its population was 58, in 12 families.
