= Bon Zard, Kerman =

Bon Zard بن زرد
- Village
- Location within Iran
- Coordinates: 26°52′58″N 58°08′49″E
- Country: Iran
- Province: Kerman
- County: Qaleh Ganj
- Bakhsh: Chah Dadkhoda
- Rural District: Marz

Population (2006)
  - Total: 49
- Time zone: UTC+3:30 (IRST)
  - Summer (DST): UTC+4:30 (IRDT)

Bon Zard (Persian: بن زرد) is a village in Marz Rural District, Chah Dadkhoda District, Qaleh Ganj County, Kerman Province, Iran. At the 2006 census, its population was 49, in 12 families.
