= Sartang, Ilam =

Sartang سرتنگ
- Village
- Location within Iran
- Coordinates: 33°20′45″N 47°00′12″E
- Country: Iran
- Province: Ilam
- County: Eyvan
- Bakhsh: Zarneh
- Rural District: Kalan

Population (2006)
  - Total: 1,177
- Time zone: UTC+3:30 (IRST)
  - Summer (DST): UTC+4:30 (IRDT)

Sartang (Persian: سرتنگ) is a village in Kalan Rural District, Zarneh District, Eyvan County, Ilam Province, Iran. At the 2006 census, its population was 1,177, in 255 families. The village is populated by Kurds.
