= Sartal-e Abdarreh =

Sartal-e Abdarreh سرتل ابدره
- Village
- Location within Iran
- Coordinates: 31°15′39″N 50°22′58″E
- Country: Iran
- Province: Kohgiluyeh and Boyer-Ahmad
- County: Kohgiluyeh
- Bakhsh: Charusa
- Rural District: Tayebi-ye Sarhadi-ye Gharbi

Population (2006)
  - Total: 50
- Time zone: UTC+3:30 (IRST)
  - Summer (DST): UTC+4:30 (IRDT)

Sartal-e Abdarreh (Persian: سرتل ابدره, also Romanized as Sartal-e Ābdarreh; also known as Sartal and Sar Tūl) is a village in Tayebi-ye Sarhadi-ye Gharbi Rural District, Charusa District, Kohgiluyeh County, Kohgiluyeh and Boyer-Ahmad Province, Iran. At the 2006 census, its population was 50, in 10 families.
