= Sar Tang-e Gadarkhani =

Sar Tang-e Gadarkhani سرتنگ گدارخاني
- Village
- Country: Iran
- Province: Khuzestan
- County: Andika
- Bakhsh: Abezhdan
- Rural District: Abezhdan

Population (2006)
  - Total: 39
- Time zone: UTC+3:30 (IRST)
  - Summer (DST): UTC+4:30 (IRDT)

Sar Tang-e Gadarkhani (Persian: سرتنگ گدارخاني, also Romanized as Sar Tang-e Gadārkhānī) is a village in Abezhdan Rural District, Abezhdan District, Andika County, Khuzestan Province, Iran. At the 2006 census, its population was 39, in 10 families.
