= Sar Tang ol Majan =

Village in Kohgiluyeh and Boyer-Ahmad, Iran

Sar Tang ol Majan سرتنگ المجن
- Village
- Location within Iran
- Coordinates: 31°08′08″N 50°32′45″E
- Country: Iran
- Province: Kohgiluyeh and Boyer-Ahmad
- County: Kohgiluyeh
- Bakhsh: Charusa
- Rural District: Tayebi-ye Sarhadi-ye Gharbi

Population (2006)
  - Total: 27
- Time zone: UTC+3:30 (IRST)
  - Summer (DST): UTC+4:30 (IRDT)

Sar Tang ol Majan (Persian: سرتنگ المجن; also known as Sar Tang) is a village in Tayebi-ye Sarhadi-ye Gharbi Rural District, Charusa District, Kohgiluyeh County, Kohgiluyeh and Boyer-Ahmad Province, Iran. At the 2006 census, its population was 27, in 6 families.
