= Bizhgan, Chaharmahal and Bakhtiari =

Bizhgan بيژگن
- Village
- Location within Iran
- Coordinates: 31°15′45″N 51°10′45″E
- Country: Iran
- Province: Chaharmahal and Bakhtiari
- County: Lordegan
- Bakhsh: Falard
- Rural District: Poshtkuh

Population (2006)
  - Total: 167
- Time zone: UTC+3:30 (IRST)
  - Summer (DST): UTC+4:30 (IRDT)

Bizhgan (Persian: بيژگن, also Romanized as Bīzhgan; also known as Bīzhan and Bīzh Gerd) is a village in Poshtkuh Rural District, Falard District, Lordegan County, Chaharmahal and Bakhtiari Province, Iran. At the 2006 census, its population was 167, in 30 families. The village is populated by Lurs.
