= Sar Tang, Izeh =

Sar Tang سرتنگ
- Village
- Location within Iran
- Coordinates: 32°02′26″N 49°43′54″E
- Country: Iran
- Province: Khuzestan
- County: Izeh
- Bakhsh: Central
- Rural District: Pian

Population (2006)
  - Total: 214
- Time zone: UTC+3:30 (IRST)
  - Summer (DST): UTC+4:30 (IRDT)

Sar Tang (Persian: سرتنگ) is a village in Pian Rural District, in the Central District of Izeh County, Khuzestan Province, Iran. At the 2006 census, its population was 214, in 37 families.
