= Sar Tang-e Bard Gadun =

Sar Tang-e Bard Gadun سرتنگ بردگادون
- Village
- Location within Iran
- Coordinates: 30°53′36″N 51°18′51″E
- Country: Iran
- Province: Kohgiluyeh and Boyer-Ahmad
- County: Basht
- Bakhsh: Central
- Rural District: Kuh Mareh Khami

Population (2006)
  - Total: 55
- Time zone: UTC+3:30 (IRST)
  - Summer (DST): UTC+4:30 (IRDT)

Sar Tang-e Bard Gadun (Persian: سرتنگ بردگادون, also Romanized as Sartang-e Bard Gādūn; also known as Sar Tang and Sartang-e Bālā) is a village in Kuh Mareh Khami Rural District, in the Central District of Basht County, Kohgiluyeh and Boyer-Ahmad Province, Iran. At the 2006 census, its population was 55, in 12 families.
