= Shahrak-e Sartang =

Village in Ilam province, Iran

Shahrak-e Sartang Persian: شهرك سرتنگ
- Village
- Location within Iran Location within Ilam Province
- Coordinates: 33°38′40″N 46°40′36″E
- Country: Iran
- Province: Ilam
- County: Sirvan
- District: Karezan
- Rural District: Zangvan

Population (2016)
  - Total: 786
- Time zone: UTC+3:30 (IRST)

Shahrak-e Sartang (Persian: شهرك سرتنگ) (Note: Also known as Shahrak-e Jomhūrī-ye Eslāmī-ye Sartang and Shahrak-e Sartang-e Zangūn) is a village in, and the capital of, Zangvan Rural District of Karezan District, Sirvan County, Ilam province, Iran.

== Demographics ==
=== Ethnicity ===
The village is populated by Kurds.

=== Population ===
At the time of the 2006 National Census, the village's population was 967 in 208 households, when it was in the former Shirvan District of Chardavol County. (Note: Formerly Shirvan and Chardavol County) The following census in 2011 counted 988 people in 264 households. The 2016 census measured the population of the village as 786 people in 223 households, by which time the district had been separated from the county in the establishment of Sirvan County. The rural district was transferred to the new Karezan District. It was the most populous village in its rural district.
