= Sar Tall, Khash =

Sar Tall سر تل
- Village
- Location within Iran
- Coordinates: 28°48′37″N 60°43′52″E
- Country: Iran
- Province: Sistan and Baluchestan
- County: Khash
- Bakhsh: Nukabad
- Rural District: Nazil

Population (2006)
  - Total: 30
- Time zone: UTC+3:30 (IRST)
  - Summer (DST): UTC+4:30 (IRDT)

Sar Tall (Persian: سر تل, also Romanized as Sartal) is a village in Nazil Rural District, Nukabad District, Khash County, Sistan and Baluchestan Province, Iran. At the 2006 census, its population was 30, in 10 families.
