= Tamanak-e Sofla, Boyer-Ahmad =

Tamanak-e Sofla تمنك سفلي
- Village
- Location within Iran
- Coordinates: 30°28′38″N 51°23′51″E
- Country: Iran
- Province: Kohgiluyeh and Boyer-Ahmad
- County: Boyer-Ahmad
- Bakhsh: Central
- Rural District: Sepidar

Population (2006)
  - Total: 48
- Time zone: UTC+3:30 (IRST)
  - Summer (DST): UTC+4:30 (IRDT)

Tamanak-e Sofla (Persian: تمنك سفلي, also Romanized as Tamānak-e Soflá; also known as Tūmanak-e Pā’īn, Tūmānak-e Soflá, and Tūmanak-e Soflá) is a village in Sepidar Rural District, in the Central District of Boyer-Ahmad County, Kohgiluyeh and Boyer-Ahmad Province, Iran. At the 2006 census, its population was forty-eight, in eight families.
