= Sartol, Dehdez =

Sartol سرتل
- Village
- Location within Iran
- Coordinates: 31°42′46″N 50°17′18″E
- Country: Iran
- Province: Khuzestan
- County: Izeh
- Bakhsh: Dehdez
- Rural District: Dehdez

Population (2006)
  - Total: 36
- Time zone: UTC+3:30 (IRST)
  - Summer (DST): UTC+4:30 (IRDT)

Sartol (Persian: سرتل) is a village in Dehdez Rural District, Dehdez District, Izeh County, Khuzestan Province, Iran. At the 2006 census, its population was 36, in 5 families.
