= Sar Tang-e Firuzabad =

Sar Tang-e Firuzabad سرتنگ فيروزاباد
- Village
- Location within Iran
- Coordinates: 30°43′27″N 51°26′15″E
- Country: Iran
- Province: Kohgiluyeh and Boyer-Ahmad
- County: Boyer-Ahmad
- Bakhsh: Central
- Rural District: Sarrud-e Jonubi

Population (2006)
  - Total: 128
- Time zone: UTC+3:30 (IRST)
  - Summer (DST): UTC+4:30 (IRDT)

Sar Tang-e Firuzabad (Persian: سرتنگ فيروزاباد, also Romanized as Sar Tang-e Fīrūzābād; also known as Sar Tang) is a village in Sarrud-e Jonubi Rural District, in the Central District of Boyer-Ahmad County, Kohgiluyeh and Boyer-Ahmad Province, Iran. At the 2006 census, its population was 128, in 32 families.
