= Sartan, Iran =

Sartan سرطان
- Village
- Location within Iran
- Coordinates: 36°37′34″N 45°29′43″E
- Country: Iran
- Province: West Azerbaijan
- County: Mahabad
- Bakhsh: Khalifan
- Rural District: Mangur-e Sharqi

Population (2006)
  - Total: 250
- Time zone: UTC+3:30 (IRST)
  - Summer (DST): UTC+4:30 (IRDT)

Sartan (Persian: سرطان, also Romanized as Sarţān; also known as Sartang) is a village in Mangur-e Sharqi Rural District, Khalifan District, Mahabad County, West Azerbaijan Province, Iran. At the 2006 census, its population was 250, in 51 families.
