= Sar Tang Mahi =

Sar Tang Mahi سرتنگ ماهي
- Village
- Country: Iran
- Province: Lorestan
- County: Aligudarz
- Bakhsh: Zaz and Mahru
- Rural District: Mahru

Population (2006)
  - Total: 38
- Time zone: UTC+3:30 (IRST)
  - Summer (DST): UTC+4:30 (IRDT)

Sar Tang Mahi (Persian: سرتنگ ماهي, also Romanized as Sar Tang Māhī) is a village in Mahru Rural District, Zaz and Mahru District, Aligudarz County, Lorestan Province, Iran. At the 2006 census, its population was 38, in 7 families.
