= Sar Tang-e Pivareh =

Sar Tang-e Pivareh سرتنگ پيواره
- Village
- Location within Iran
- Coordinates: 30°59′53″N 51°13′43″E
- Country: Iran
- Province: Kohgiluyeh and Boyer-Ahmad
- County: Boyer-Ahmad
- Bakhsh: Ludab
- Rural District: Ludab

Population (2006)
  - Total: 72
- Time zone: UTC+3:30 (IRST)
  - Summer (DST): UTC+4:30 (IRDT)

Sar Tang-e Pivareh (Persian: سرتنگ پيواره, also Romanized as Sar Tang-e Pīvāreh; also known as Sar Tang) is a village in Ludab Rural District, Ludab District, Boyer-Ahmad County, Kohgiluyeh and Boyer-Ahmad Province, Iran. At the 2006 census, its population was 72, in 11 families.
