= Sar Tang-e Bid Gijeh =

Sar Tang-e Bid Gijeh سرتنگ بيدگيجه
- Village
- Location within Iran
- Coordinates: 33°35′39″N 48°44′40″E
- Country: Iran
- Province: Lorestan
- County: Khorramabad
- Bakhsh: Zagheh
- Rural District: Qaedrahmat

Population (2006)
  - Total: 25
- Time zone: UTC+3:30 (IRST)
  - Summer (DST): UTC+4:30 (IRDT)

Sar Tang-e Bid Gijeh (Persian: سرتنگ بيدگيجه, also Romanized as Sar Tang-e Bīd Gījeh; also known as Sar Tang) is a village in Qaedrahmat Rural District, Zagheh District, Khorramabad County, Lorestan Province, Iran. At the 2006 census, its population was 25, in 4 families.
