= Sartang-e Badam Shirin =

Sartang-e Badam Shirin سرتنگ بادام شيرين
- Village
- Location within Iran
- Coordinates: 32°00′15″N 50°06′34″E
- Country: Iran
- Province: Chaharmahal and Bakhtiari
- County: Kuhrang
- Bakhsh: Bazoft
- Rural District: Doab

Population (2006)
  - Total: 39
- Time zone: UTC+3:30 (IRST)
  - Summer (DST): UTC+4:30 (IRDT)

Sartang-e Badam Shirin (Persian: سرتنگ بادام شيرين, also Romanized as Sartang-e Bādām Shīrīn; also known as Sartang-e Fāleḩ) is a village in Doab Rural District, Bazoft District, Kuhrang County, Chaharmahal and Bakhtiari Province, Iran. At the 2006 census, its population was 39, in 6 families. The village is populated by Lurs.
