= Sar Tang-e Leyshan =

Sar Tang-e Leyshan سرتنگ ليشن
- Village
- Location within Iran
- Coordinates: 33°01′29″N 48°45′58″E
- Country: Iran
- Province: Lorestan
- County: Khorramabad
- Bakhsh: Papi
- Rural District: Tang-e Haft

Population (2006)
  - Total: 74
- Time zone: UTC+3:30 (IRST)
  - Summer (DST): UTC+4:30 (IRDT)

Sar Tang-e Leyshan (Persian: سرتنگ ليشن) is a village in Tang-e Haft Rural District, Papi District, Khorramabad County, Lorestan Province, Iran. At the 2006 census, its population was 74, in 17 families.
