= Sartal-e Melleh Gahar =

Sartal-e Melleh Gahar سرتل مله گهر
- Village
- Location within Iran
- Coordinates: 31°16′03″N 50°23′41″E
- Country: Iran
- Province: Kohgiluyeh and Boyer-Ahmad
- County: Kohgiluyeh
- Bakhsh: Dishmok
- Rural District: Bahmayi-ye Sarhadi-ye Gharbi

Population (2006)
  - Total: 70
- Time zone: UTC+3:30 (IRST)
  - Summer (DST): UTC+4:30 (IRDT)

Sartal-e Melleh Gahar (Persian: سرتل مله گهر; also known as Sartal-e Tīghāb) is a village in Bahmayi-ye Sarhadi-ye Gharbi Rural District, Dishmok District, Kohgiluyeh County, Kohgiluyeh and Boyer-Ahmad Province, Iran. At the 2006 census, its population was 70, in 12 families.
