= Sar Tang-e Kuchak =

Sar Tang-e Kuchak سرتنگ كوچك
- Village
- Location within Iran
- Coordinates: 30°21′17″N 51°38′43″E
- Country: Iran
- Province: Fars
- County: Mamasani
- Bakhsh: Central
- Rural District: Jowzar

Population (2006)
  - Total: 103
- Time zone: UTC+3:30 (IRST)
  - Summer (DST): UTC+4:30 (IRDT)

Sar Tang-e Kuchak (Persian: سرتنگ كوچك, also Romanized as Sar Tang-e Kūchak; also known as Sar Tang-e Soflá) is a village in Jowzar Rural District, in the Central District of Mamasani County, Fars province, Iran. At the 2006 census, its population was 103, in 23 families.
