= Sar Tol-e Dowlatabad =

Sar Tol-e Dowlatabad سرتل دولت آباد
- Village
- Location within Iran
- Coordinates: 28°45′25″N 52°30′03″E
- Country: Iran
- Province: Fars
- County: Firuzabad
- Bakhsh: Central
- Rural District: Ahmadabad

Population (2006)
  - Total: 692
- Time zone: UTC+3:30 (IRST)
  - Summer (DST): UTC+4:30 (IRDT)

Sar Tol-e Dowlatabad (Persian: سرتل دولت آباد, also Romanized as Sar Tol-e Dowlatābād; also known as Sar-e Tol and Sar Tol) is a village in Ahmadabad Rural District, in the Central District of Firuzabad County, Fars province, Iran. At the 2006 census, its population was 692, in 150 families.
