= Sartang-e Landeh =

Sartang-e Landeh سرتنگ لنده
- Village
- Location within Iran
- Coordinates: 30°59′49″N 50°25′42″E
- Country: Iran
- Province: Kohgiluyeh and Boyer-Ahmad
- County: Landeh
- Bakhsh: Central
- Rural District: Tayebi-ye Garmsiri-ye Shomali

Population (2006)
  - Total: 16
- Time zone: UTC+3:30 (IRST)
  - Summer (DST): UTC+4:30 (IRDT)

Sartang-e Landeh (Persian: سرتنگ لنده, also Romanized as Sartang-e Lendeh) is a village in Tayebi-ye Garmsiri-ye Shomali Rural District, in the Central District of Landeh County, Kohgiluyeh and Boyer-Ahmad Province, Iran. At the 2006 census, its population was 16, in 6 families.
