= Sar Tang-e Darreh Shir =

Sar Tang-e Darreh Shir سرتنگ دره شير
- Village
- Country: Iran
- Province: Hormozgan
- County: Hajjiabad
- Bakhsh: Central
- Rural District: Dar Agah

Population (2006)
  - Total: 89
- Time zone: UTC+3:30 (IRST)
  - Summer (DST): UTC+4:30 (IRDT)

Sar Tang-e Darreh Shir (Persian: سرتنگ دره شير, also Romanized as Sar Tang-e Darreh Shīr) is a village in Dar Agah Rural District, in the Central District of Hajjiabad County, Hormozgan Province, Iran. At the 2006 census, its population was 89, in 21 families.
