= Sar Tang-e Darrehi =

Sar Tang-e Darrehi سرتنگ دره اي
- Village
- Location within Iran
- Coordinates: 28°12′32″N 57°06′07″E
- Country: Iran
- Province: Kerman
- County: Faryab
- Bakhsh: Central
- Rural District: Hur

Population (2006)
  - Total: 57
- Time zone: UTC+3:30 (IRST)
  - Summer (DST): UTC+4:30 (IRDT)

Sar Tang-e Darrehi (Persian: سرتنگ دره اي, also Romanized as Sar Tang-e Darreh’ī; also known as Sar Tang) is a village in Hur Rural District, in the Central District of Faryab County, Kerman Province, Iran. At the 2006 census, its population was 57, in 9 families.
