= Sar Tang, Chaharmahal and Bakhtiari =

Sar Tang سرتنگ
- Village
- Location in Iran
- Coordinates: 31°53′19″N 50°29′59″E
- Country: Iran
- Province: Chaharmahal and Bakhtiari
- County: Ardal
- Bakhsh: Central
- Rural District: Dinaran

Population (2006)
  - Total: 64
- Time zone: UTC+3:30 (IRST)
  - Summer (DST): UTC+4:30 (IRDT)

Sar Tang (Persian: سرتنگ; also known as Sar Tang-e Maḩmūd) is a village in Dinaran Rural District, in the Central District of Ardal County, Chaharmahal and Bakhtiari Province, Iran. At the 2006 census, its population was 64, in 10 families.
