= Sartang-e Bozorg =

Sartang-e Bozorg سرتنگ بزرگ
- Village
- Location within Iran
- Coordinates: 30°23′25″N 51°37′09″E
- Country: Iran
- Province: Fars
- County: Mamasani
- Bakhsh: Central
- Rural District: Jowzar

Population (2006)
  - Total: 193
- Time zone: UTC+3:30 (IRST)
  - Summer (DST): UTC+4:30 (IRDT)

Sartang-e Bozorg (Persian: سرتنگ بزرگ) is a village in Jowzar Rural District, in the Central District of Mamasani County, Fars province, Iran. At the 2006 census, its population was 193, in 48 families.
