= Talgehi =

Talgehi تل گهي
- Village
- Location within Iran
- Coordinates: 30°43′29″N 51°25′01″E
- Country: Iran
- Province: Kohgiluyeh and Boyer-Ahmad
- County: Boyer-Ahmad
- Bakhsh: Central
- Rural District: Sarrud-e Jonubi

Population (2006)
  - Total: 148
- Time zone: UTC+3:30 (IRST)
  - Summer (DST): UTC+4:30 (IRDT)

Talgehi (Persian: تل گهي, also Romanized as Talgehī; also known as Talgehī-ye Pā’īn and Tall Gah) is a village in Sarrud-e Jonubi Rural District, in the Central District of Boyer-Ahmad County, Kohgiluyeh and Boyer-Ahmad Province, Iran. At the 2006 census, its population was 148, in 36 families.
