= Tamanak-e Olya, Boyer-Ahmad =

Village in Kohgiluyeh and Boyer-Ahmad, Iran

Tamanak-e Olya تمنك عليا
- Village
- Location within Iran
- Coordinates: 30°29′07″N 51°23′21″E
- Country: Iran
- Province: Kohgiluyeh and Boyer-Ahmad
- County: Boyer-Ahmad
- Bakhsh: Central
- Rural District: Sepidar

Population (2006)
  - Total: 35
- Time zone: UTC+3:30 (IRST)
  - Summer (DST): UTC+4:30 (IRDT)

Tamanak-e Olya (Persian: تمنك عليا, also Romanized as Tamānak-e ‘Olyā; also known as Tūmanak-e Bālā, Tūmānak-e ‘Olyā, and Tūmanak-e ‘Olyā) is a village in Sepidar Rural District, in the Central District of Boyer-Ahmad County, Kohgiluyeh and Boyer-Ahmad Province, Iran. At the 2006 census, its population was 35, in 7 families.
