= Sar Tang-e Soleyman Koshteh =

Sar Tang-e Soleyman Koshteh سرتنگ سليمان كشته
- Village
- Location within Iran
- Coordinates: 31°41′00″N 49°57′00″E
- Country: Iran
- Province: Khuzestan
- County: Bagh-e Malek
- Bakhsh: Central
- Rural District: Qaleh Tall

Population (2006)
  - Total: 18
- Time zone: UTC+3:30 (IRST)
  - Summer (DST): UTC+4:30 (IRDT)

Sar Tang-e Soleyman Koshteh (Persian: سرتنگ سليمان كشته, also Romanized as Sar Tang-e Soleymān Koshteh) is a village in Qaleh Tall Rural District, in the Central District of Bagh-e Malek County, Khuzestan Province, Iran. At the 2006 census, its population was 18, in 10 families.
