= Sartang-e Lirab =

Sartang-e Lirab سرتنگ ليراب
- Village
- Location within Iran
- Coordinates: 31°25′47″N 50°25′25″E
- Country: Iran
- Province: Kohgiluyeh and Boyer-Ahmad
- County: Kohgiluyeh
- Bakhsh: Dishmok
- Rural District: Bahmayi-ye Sarhadi-ye Sharqi

Population (2006)
  - Total: 138
- Time zone: UTC+3:30 (IRST)
  - Summer (DST): UTC+4:30 (IRDT)

Sartang-e Lirab (Persian: سرتنگ ليراب, also Romanized as Sartang-e Līrāb) is a village in Bahmayi-ye Sarhadi-ye Sharqi Rural District, Dishmok District, Kohgiluyeh County, Kohgiluyeh and Boyer-Ahmad Province, Iran. At the 2006 census, its population was 138, in 23 families.
