= Sartang-e Tang Sorkh =

Sartang-e Tang Sorkh سرتنگ تنگ سرخ
- Village
- Location within Iran
- Coordinates: 30°41′44″N 51°15′16″E
- Country: Iran
- Province: Kohgiluyeh and Boyer-Ahmad
- County: Boyer-Ahmad
- Bakhsh: Central
- Rural District: Sarrud-e Jonubi

Population (2006)
  - Total: 30
- Time zone: UTC+3:30 (IRST)
  - Summer (DST): UTC+4:30 (IRDT)

Sartang-e Tang Sorkh (Persian: سرتنگ تنگ سرخ; also known as Sartang-e Keyẕāmen and Tang-e Key Ẕāmenī) is a village in Sarrud-e Jonubi Rural District, in the Central District of Boyer-Ahmad County, Kohgiluyeh and Boyer-Ahmad Province, Iran. At the 2006 census, its population was 30, in 7 families.
