= Shahrak-e Sartang-e Bijar =

Shahrak-e Sartang-e Bijar شهرك سرتنگ بيجار
- Village
- Location within Iran
- Coordinates: 33°41′57″N 45°49′57″E
- Country: Iran
- Province: Ilam
- County: Ilam
- Bakhsh: Chavar
- Rural District: Boli

Population (2006)
  - Total: 68
- Time zone: UTC+3:30 (IRST)
  - Summer (DST): UTC+4:30 (IRDT)

Shahrak-e Sartang-e Bijar (Persian: شهرك سرتنگ بيجار, also Romanized as Shahrak-e Sartang-e Bījār) is a village in Boli Rural District, Chavar District, Ilam County, Ilam Province, Iran. At the 2006 census, its population was 68, in 14 families. The village is populated by Kurds.
