= Sartang-e Shab Kuri =

Sartang-e Shab Kuri سرتنگ شبكوري
- Village
- Location within Iran
- Coordinates: 31°57′00″N 49°45′00″E
- Country: Iran
- Province: Khuzestan
- County: Izeh
- Bakhsh: Central
- Rural District: Pian

Population (2006)
  - Total: 2,146
- Time zone: UTC+3:30 (IRST)
  - Summer (DST): UTC+4:30 (IRDT)

Sartang-e Shab Kuri (Persian: سرتنگ شبكوري, also Romanized as Sartang-e Shab Kūrī) is a village in Pian Rural District, in the Central District of Izeh County, Khuzestan Province, Iran. At the 2006 census, its population was 2,146, in 361 families.
