= Sar Tang, Hormozgan =

Sar Tang سرتنگ
- Village
- Location within Iran
- Coordinates: 27°21′53″N 55°03′54″E
- Country: Iran
- Province: Hormozgan
- County: Khamir
- Bakhsh: Central
- Rural District: Kohurestan

Population (2006)
  - Total: 119
- Time zone: UTC+3:30 (IRST)
  - Summer (DST): UTC+4:30 (IRDT)

Sar Tang (Persian: سرتنگ, also Romanized as Sar-e Tang; also known as Sar-e Tal, Sar-e Tall, Sar-e Tol, and Sar Tal) is a village in Kohurestan Rural District, in the Central District of Khamir County, Hormozgan Province, Iran. At the 2006 census, its population was 119, in 25 families.
