= Dana Rural District =

Rural district in Kohgiluyeh and Boyer-Ahmad province, Iran

Dana Rural District Persian: دهستان دنا
- Rural District
- Location within Iran
- Coordinates: 30°52′17″N 51°28′34″E
- Country: Iran
- Province: Kohgiluyeh and Boyer-Ahmad
- County: Dana
- District: Central
- Capital: Kareyak

Population (2016)
  - Total: 4,776
- Time zone: UTC+3:30 (IRST)

Dana Rural District (Persian: دهستان دنا) is in the Central District of Dana County, Kohgiluyeh and Boyer-Ahmad province, Iran. Its capital is the village of Kareyak.

== Demographics ==
=== Population ===
At the time of the 2006 National Census, the rural district's population was 4,905 in 1,152 households. There were 4,953 inhabitants in 1,337 households at the following census of 2011. The 2016 census measured the population of the rural district as 4,776 in 1,412 households. The most populous of its 25 villages was Masumabad va Aliabad-e Kareyak, with 1,004 people.
