= Tut-e Nadeh Rural District =

Rural district in Kohgiluyeh and Boyer-Ahmad province, Iran

Tut-e Nadeh Rural District Persian: دهستان توت نده
- Rural District
- Location within Iran
- Coordinates: 30°54′51″N 51°20′16″E
- Country: Iran
- Province: Kohgiluyeh and Boyer-Ahmad
- County: Dana
- District: Central
- Capital: Tut-e Nadeh

Population (2016)
  - Total: 4,842
- Time zone: UTC+3:30 (IRST)

Tut-e Nadeh Rural District (Persian: دهستان توت نده) is in the Central District of Dana County, Kohgiluyeh and Boyer-Ahmad province, Iran. Its capital is the village of Tut-e Nadeh.

== Demographics ==
=== Population ===
At the time of the 2006 National Census, the rural district's population was 5,251 in 1,143 households. There were 5,037 inhabitants in 1,285 households at the following census of 2011. The 2016 census measured the population of the rural district as 4,842 in 1,353 households. The most populous of its 18 villages was Tut-e Nadeh, with 1,510 people.
