= Central District (Dana County) =

District in Kohgiluyeh and Boyer-Ahmad province, Iran

Central District (Dana County) Persian: بخش مرکزی شهرستان دنا
- District
- Location within Iran
- Coordinates: 30°52′46″N 51°26′26″E
- Country: Iran
- Province: Kohgiluyeh and Boyer-Ahmad
- County: Dana
- Capital: Sisakht

Population (2016)
  - Total: 17,473
- Time zone: UTC+3:30 (IRST)

The Central District of Dana County (Persian: بخش مرکزی شهرستان دنا) is in Kohgiluyeh and Boyer-Ahmad province, Iran. Its capital is the city of Sisakht.

== Demographics ==
=== Population ===
At the time of the 2006 National Census, the district's population was 16,498 in 3,823 households. The following census in 2011 counted 17,379 people in 4,474 households. The 2016 census measured the population of the district as 17,473 inhabitants in 4,965 households.

=== Administrative divisions ===
Central District (Dana County) Population
Administrative Divisions	2006	2011	2016
Dana RD	4,905	4,953	4,776
Tut-e Nadeh RD	5,251	5,037	4,842
Sisakht (city)	6,342	7,389	7,855
Total	16,498	17,379	17,473
RD = Rural District
