= Sadat Mahmudi Rural District =

Rural district in Kohgiluyeh and Boyer-Ahmad province, Iran

Sadat Mahmudi Rural District Persian: دهستان سادات محمودئ
- Rural District
- Location within Iran
- Coordinates: 31°07′53″N 51°06′30″E
- Country: Iran
- Province: Kohgiluyeh and Boyer-Ahmad
- County: Dana
- District: Pataveh
- Capital: Dozdak

Population (2016)
  - Total: 10,156
- Time zone: UTC+3:30 (IRST)

Sadat Mahmudi Rural District (Persian: دهستان سادات محمودئ) is in Pataveh District of Dana County, Kohgiluyeh and Boyer-Ahmad province, Iran. Its capital is the village of Dozdak.

== Demographics ==
=== Population ===
At the time of the 2006 National Census, the rural district's population was 10,370 in 2,088 households. There were 10,227 inhabitants in 2,422 households at the following census of 2011. The 2016 census measured the population of the rural district as 10,156 in 2,730 households. The most populous of its 46 villages was Meymand, with 1,463 people.
