= Pataveh Rural District =

Rural district in Kohgiluyeh and Boyer-Ahmad province, Iran

Pataveh Rural District Persian: دهستان پاتاوه
- Rural District
- Location within Iran
- Coordinates: 31°00′08″N 51°11′34″E
- Country: Iran
- Province: Kohgiluyeh and Boyer-Ahmad
- County: Dana
- District: Pataveh
- Capital: Pataveh

Population (2016)
  - Total: 12,624
- Time zone: UTC+3:30 (IRST)

Pataveh Rural District (Persian: دهستان پاتاوه) is in Pataveh District of Dana County, Kohgiluyeh and Boyer-Ahmad province, Iran. It is administered from the city of Pataveh.

== Demographics ==
=== Population ===
At the time of the 2006 National Census, the rural district's population was 14,983 in 2,978 households. There were 13,145 inhabitants in 3,210 households at the following census of 2011. The 2016 census measured the population of the rural district as 12,624 in 3,381 households. The most populous of its 50 villages was Tomanak-e Olya, with 1,707 people.
