= Pataveh District =

District in Kohgiluyeh and Boyer-Ahmad province, Iran

Pataveh District Persian: بخش پاتاوه
- District
- Location within Iran
- Coordinates: 31°06′37″N 51°06′15″E
- Country: Iran
- Province: Kohgiluyeh and Boyer-Ahmad
- County: Dana
- Capital: Pataveh

Population (2016)
  - Total: 25,064
- Time zone: UTC+3:30 (IRST)

Pataveh District (Persian: بخش پاتاوه) is in Dana County, Kohgiluyeh and Boyer-Ahmad province, Iran. Its capital is the city of Pataveh.

== History ==
After the 2006 National Census, the village of Pataveh was elevated to the status of a city.

== Demographics ==
=== Population ===
At the time of the 2006 census, the district's population was 25,353 in 5,066 households. The following census in 2011 counted 25,686 people in 6,154 households. The 2016 census measured the population of the district as 25,064 inhabitants in 6,740 households.

=== Administrative divisions ===
Pataveh District Population
Administrative Divisions	2006	2011	2016
Pataveh RD	14,983	13,145	12,624
Sadat Mahmudi RD	10,370	10,227	10,156
Pataveh (city)		2,314	2,284
Total	25,353	25,686	25,064
RD = Rural District
