= Dana County =

County in Kohgiluyeh and Boyer-Ahmad province, Iran

Dana County Persian: شهرستان دنا
- County
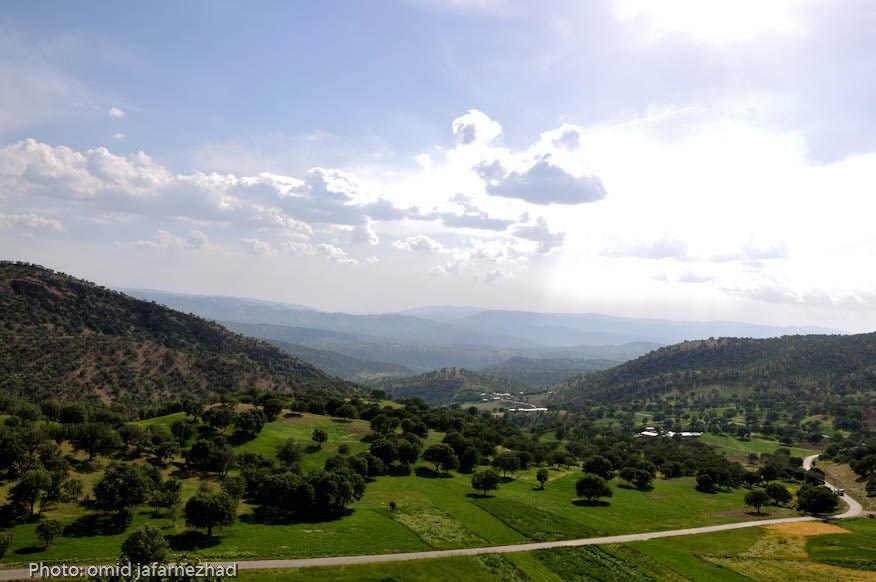
- Landscape in Dana County

- Location of Dana County in Kohgiluyeh and Boyer-Ahmad province (right, yellow)

- Location of Kohgiluyeh and Boyer-Ahmad province in Iran
- Coordinates: 31°02′N 51°16′E
- Country: Iran
- Province: Kohgiluyeh and Boyer-Ahmad
- Capital: Sisakht
- Districts: Central, Pataveh

Population (2016)
  - Total: 42,539
- Time zone: UTC+3:30 (IRST)

Dana County (Persian: شهرستان دنا) (Note: Lurish: شݴرستانی دنا) is in Kohgiluyeh and Boyer-Ahmad province, southwest Iran. Its capital is the city of Sisakht.

== History ==
After the 2006 National Census, the villages of Chitab and Pataveh were elevated to city status. After the 2011 census, Kabgian District was separated from the county to join Boyer-Ahmad County.

== Demographics ==
=== Population ===
At the time of the 2006 census, the county's population was 52,242 in 11,117 households. The following census in 2011 counted 52,040 people in 12,835 households. The 2016 census measured the population of the county as 42,539 in 11,706 households.

=== Administrative divisions ===
Dana County's population history and administrative structure over three consecutive censuses are shown in the following table.

Dana County Population
Administrative Divisions	2006	2011	2016
Central District	16,498	17,379	17,473
Dana RD	4,905	4,953	4,776
Tut-e Nadeh RD	5,251	5,037	4,842
Sisakht (city)	6,342	7,389	7,855
Kabgian District (Note: Transferred to Boyer-Ahmad County)	10,391	8,975	
Chenar RD	2,297	1,958	
Kabgian RD	8,094	5,599	
Chitab (city)		1,418	
Pataveh District	25,353	25,686	25,064
Pataveh RD	14,983	13,145	12,624
Sadat Mahmudi RD	10,370	10,227	10,156
Pataveh (city)		2,314	2,284
Total	52,242	52,040	42,539
RD = Rural District

== Geography ==
Dana County is located in the north of Kohgiluyeh and Boyer-Ahmad provinces and has an area of 1,821 square kilometers. This county is limited to Semirom County in Isfahan province and Lordegan County from the north and Boyer-Ahmad County from the south.

The main water resources of Dana County are: Kabkian river, Khorsan river, Tang Potak river, Diashm river, Korea village, Bahram Beigi and Shebliz rivers, Meymand waterfall, as well as a number of seasonal and permanent waterfalls called Bahram Beigi waterfall, Manj and Dudrak Korea, Nari valley and Tuf Shah is flowing in this city. The important heights of this city are: Dena or Dinar peak with a height of 4,409 meters, which is the ninth highest peak in Iran and every year a large number of mountaineers from all over the country and other parts of the world enter the city of Sisakht to conquer it and other neighboring peaks. Other important heights of this city include the heights of Shorum, Siouk Mountain and Siah Kooh.
