= Ab Zalu =

Ab Zalu (Persian: اب زالو) may refer to:

- Ab Zalu, Fars
- Ab Zalu, Andika, Khuzestan Province
- Abzalu, Izeh County, Khuzestan Province
- Ab Zalu-ye Arab, Masjed Soleyman County, Khuzestan Province
- Ab Zalu-ye Bahram, Masjed Soleyman County, Khuzestan Province
- Ab Zalu, Kohgiluyeh and Boyer-Ahmad
- Ab Zalu-ye Olya-ye Neqareh Khaneh, Kohgiluyeh and Boyer-Ahmad Province
- Ab Zalu-ye Sofla-ye Neqareh Khaneh, Kohgiluyeh and Boyer-Ahmad Province
- Ab Zalu-ye Vosta-ye Neqareh Khaneh, Kohgiluyeh and Boyer-Ahmad Province

== See also ==
- Ab Zehlu (disambiguation)
