= Nargesi =

Nargesi (Persian: نرگسي) may refer to:

- Nargesi (food)
- Nargesi, Fars
- Nargesi, Kazerun, Fars Province
- Nargesi-ye Deli Qayid Shafi, Fars Province
- Nargesi, Ilam
- Nargesi, Andika, Khuzestan Province
- Nargesi, Izeh, Khuzestan Province
- Nargesi, Masjed Soleyman, Khuzestan Province
- Nargesi-ye Batuli, Khuzestan Province
- Nargesi, Kohgiluyeh and Boyer-Ahmad
- Nargesi-ye Guznan, Kohgiluyeh and Boyer-Ahmad Province
