= Sabzabad =

Sabzabad (Persian: سبزاباد) may refer to:

- Sabzabad, Neyriz, Fars Province
- Sabzabad, Shiraz, Fars Province
- Sabzabad, Hamadan
- Sabzabad, Isfahan
- Sabzabad, Tombi Golgir, Khuzestan Province
- Sabzabad-e Olya, Tombi Golgir Rural District
- Sabzabad-e Sofla, Tombi Golgir Rural District
- Sabzabad, Markazi
