= Habibabad (disambiguation) =

Habibabad is a town in Pakistan.

Habibabad (Persian: حبيباباد) may also refer to:

- Habibabad, Fars
- Habibabad, Rostam, Fars Province
- Habibabad, Hamadan
- Habibabad, Isfahan
- Habibabad, Jarqavieh Sofla, Isfahan County, Isfahan Province
- Habibabad, Natanz, Isfahan Province
- Habibabad, Masjed Soleyman, Khuzestan Province
- Habibabad, Shushtar, Khuzestan Province
- Habibabad-e Mazdak, Kohgiluyeh and Boyer-Ahmad Province
- Habibabad, Mazandaran
- Habibabad, Razavi Khorasan
- Habibabad, Nukabad, Khash County, Sistan and Baluchestan Province
- Habibabad, Tehran
- Habibabad District
