= Cheshmeh Ali =

Cheshmeh Ali or Cheshmeh-ye Ali or Chashmeh Ali (Persian: چشمه علي) may refer to:

- Cheshmeh-Ali (Shahr-e-Rey)
- Cheshmeh Ali, Chaharmahal and Bakhtiari
- Cheshmeh Ali, Golestan
- Cheshmeh Ali, Hamadan
- Cheshmeh-ye Ali, Khuzestan
- Cheshmeh Ali, Khuzestan
- Cheshmeh Ali, Lorestan
- Cheshmeh Ali, Qom
- Cheshmeh Ali, Fariman, Razavi Khorasan Province
- Cheshmeh-ye Ali, Qalandarabad, Razavi Khorasan Province
- Chashmeh Ali, Sistan and Baluchestan

== See also ==
- Cheshmeh-ye Ali Akbar
