= Jahangiri, Iran (disambiguation) =

Jahangiri, Iran is a village in Andimeshk County, Khuzestan Province, Iran.

Jahangiri (Persian: جهانگيري), in Iran, may also refer to:

- Jahangiri-ye Olya, a village in Shadegan County, Khuzestan province, Iran
- Jahangiri-ye Sofla, a village in Shadegan County, Khuzestan province, Iran
- Jahangiri Rural District, in Masjed Soleyman County, Khuzestan province, Iran
- Jahangiri-ye Shomali Rural District, in Masjed Soleyman County, Khuzestan province, Iran
