= Parzard, Khuzestan =

Village in Khuzestan province, Iran

Parzard Persian: پرزرد
- Village
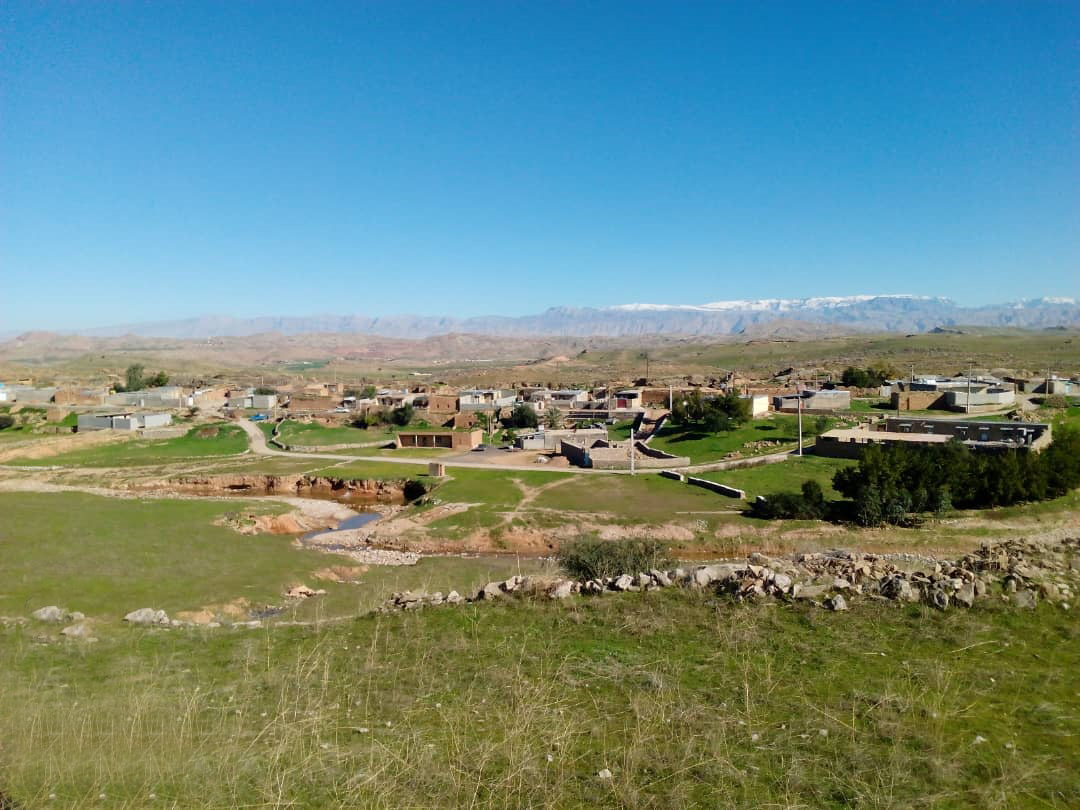

- Location within Iran
- Coordinates: 32°12′01″N 49°04′32″E
- Country: Iran
- Province: Khuzestan
- County: Masjed Soleyman
- District: Anbar
- Rural District: Zeylabi

Population (2016)
  - Total: 121
- Time zone: UTC+3:30 (IRST)

Parzard (Persian: پرزرد) (Note: Also romanized as Par-e Zard; also known as Par Zard-e ‘Alīābād) is a village in, and the capital of, Zeylabi Rural District of Anbar District, Masjed Soleyman County, Khuzestan province, Iran.

== Demographics ==
=== Population ===
At the time of the 2006 National Census, the village's population was 65 in 15 households, when it was in Jahangiri Rural District of the Central District. The following census in 2011 counted 41 people in 12 households. The 2016 census measured the population of the village as 121 people in 42 households, by which time the village had been separated from the district in the formation of Anbar District. Parzard was transferred to Zeylabi Rural District created in the new district.
