= Alamdari =

Alamdari علمداري
- Village
- Location within Iran
- Coordinates: 32°10′52″N 49°09′42″E
- Country: Iran
- Province: Khuzestan
- County: Masjed Soleyman
- Bakhsh: Central
- Rural District: Jahangiri

Population (2006)
  - Total: 57
- Time zone: UTC+3:30 (IRST)
  - Summer (DST): UTC+4:30 (IRDT)

Alamdari (Persian: علمداري, also Romanized as ‘Alamdārī) is a village in Jahangiri Rural District, in the Central District of Masjed Soleyman County, Khuzestan Province, Iran. At the 2006 census, its population was 57, in 12 families.
