= Qasemabad, Masjed Soleyman =

Village in Khuzestan province, Iran

Qasemabad Persian: قاسم اباد
- Village
- Location within Iran
- Coordinates: 31°55′22″N 49°31′27″E
- Country: Iran
- Province: Khuzestan
- County: Masjed Soleyman
- District: Golgir
- Rural District: Tolbozan

Population (2016)
  - Total: 63
- Time zone: UTC+3:30 (IRST)

Qasemabad (Persian: قاسم اباد) (Note: Also romanized as Qāsemābād) is a village in, and the capital of, Tolbozan Rural District of Golgir District, Masjed Soleyman County, Khuzestan province, Iran. The previous capital of the rural district was the village of Rezaabad.

== Demographics ==
=== Population ===
At the time of the 2006 National Census, the village's population was 105 in 18 households, when it was in the Central District. The following census in 2011 counted 95 people in 23 households, by which time the rural district had been separated from the district in the formation of Golgir District. The 2016 census measured the population of the village as 63 people in 16 households.
