= Qebleh Ei Do =

Qebleh Ei Do قبله اي دو
- Village
- Location within Iran
- Coordinates: 32°04′46″N 49°08′07″E
- Country: Iran
- Province: Khuzestan
- County: Masjed Soleyman
- Bakhsh: Central
- Rural District: Jahangiri

Population (2006)
  - Total: 20
- Time zone: UTC+3:30 (IRST)
  - Summer (DST): UTC+4:30 (IRDT)

Qebleh Ei Do (Persian: قبله اي دو, also Romanized as Qebleh Eī Do and Qebleh’ī-ye Do) is a village in Jahangiri Rural District, in the Central District of Masjed Soleyman County, Khuzestan Province, Iran. At the 2006 census, its population was 20, in 5 families.
