= Dali Owlad Mohammad Hoseyn =

Dali Owlad Mohammad Hoseyn دلي اولادمحمدحسين
- Village
- Interactive map of Dali Owlad Mohammad Hoseyn
- Country: Iran
- Province: Khuzestan
- County: Masjed Soleyman
- Bakhsh: Golgir
- Rural District: Tolbozan

Population (2006)
  - Total: 15
- Time zone: UTC+3:30 (IRST)
  - Summer (DST): UTC+4:30 (IRDT)

Dali Owlad Mohammad Hoseyn (Persian: دلي اولادمحمدحسين, also Romanized as Dalī Owlād Moḩammad Ḩoseyn) is a village in Tolbozan Rural District, Golgir District, Masjed Soleyman County, Khuzestan Province, Iran. As of the 2006 census, its population was 15, in 4 families.
