= Konjed Kar, Masjed Soleyman =

Village in Khuzestan province, Iran

Konjed Kar Persian: كنجدكار
- Village
- Location within Iran
- Coordinates: 32°10′50″N 49°03′34″E
- Country: Iran
- Province: Khuzestan
- County: Masjed Soleyman
- District: Anbar
- Rural District: Zeylabi

Population (2016)
  - Total: 128
- Time zone: UTC+3:30 (IRST)

Konjed Kar (Persian: كنجدكار) (Note: Also romanized as Konjed Kār) is a village in Zeylabi Rural District of Anbar District, Masjed Soleyman County, Khuzestan province, Iran.

== Demographics ==
=== Population ===
At the time of the 2006 National Census, the village's population was 60 in 12 households, when it was in Jahangiri Rural District of the Central District. The following census in 2011 counted 36 people in seven households. The 2016 census measured the population of the village as 128 people in 40 households, by which time the village had been separated from the district in the formation of Anbar District. Konjed Kar was transferred to Zeylabi Rural District created in the new district. It was the most populous village in its rural district.
