= Shah Vali, Masjed Soleyman =

Shah Vali شاه ولي
- Village
- Location within Iran
- Coordinates: 31°49′52″N 49°15′30″E
- Country: Iran
- Province: Khuzestan
- County: Masjed Soleyman
- Bakhsh: Golgir
- Rural District: Tombi Golgir

Population (2006)
  - Total: 27
- Time zone: UTC+3:30 (IRST)
  - Summer (DST): UTC+4:30 (IRDT)

Shah Vali (Persian: شاه ولي, also Romanized as Shāh Valī) is a village in Tombi Golgir Rural District, Golgir District, Masjed Soleyman County, Khuzestan Province, Iran. At the 2006 census, its population was 27, in 8 families.
