= Seh Bardan =

Village in Khuzestan province, Iran

Seh Bardan Persian: سه بردان
- Village
- Location within Iran
- Coordinates: 31°58′42″N 49°28′01″E
- Country: Iran
- Province: Khuzestan
- County: Masjed Soleyman
- District: Golgir
- Rural District: Tolbozan

Population (2016)
  - Total: 303
- Time zone: UTC+3:30 (IRST)

Seh Bardan (Persian: سه بردان) (Note: Also romanized as Seh Bardān; also known as Seh Bardūn) is a village in Tolbozan Rural District of Golgir District, Masjed Soleyman County, Khuzestan province, Iran.

== Demographics ==
=== Population ===
At the time of the 2006 National Census, the village's population was 184 in 37 households, when it was in the Central District. The following census in 2011 counted 212 people in 52 households, by which time the rural district had been separated from the district in the formation of Golgir District. The 2016 census measured the population of the village as 303 people in 82 households. It was the most populous village in its rural district.
