= Sarzandan =

Sarzandan سرزندان
- Village
- Location within Iran
- Coordinates: 31°56′50″N 49°30′33″E
- Country: Iran
- Province: Khuzestan
- County: Masjed Soleyman
- Bakhsh: Golgir
- Rural District: Tolbozan

Population (2006)
  - Total: 110
- Time zone: UTC+3:30 (IRST)
  - Summer (DST): UTC+4:30 (IRDT)

Sarzandan (Persian: سرزندان, also Romanized as Sarzandān) is a village in Tolbozan Rural District, Golgir District, Masjed Soleyman County, Khuzestan Province, Iran. At the 2006 census, its population was 110, in 20 families.
