= Qaleh-ye Madreseh, Masjed Soleyman =

Qaleh Madreseh Koraei قلعه مدرسه کرائی
- Village
- Location within Iran
- Coordinates: 31°44′06″N 49°15′08″E
- Country: Iran
- Province: Khuzestan
- County: Masjed Soleyman
- Bakhsh: Central
- Rural District: Tombi Golgir

Population (2006)
  - Total: 74
- Time zone: UTC+3:30 (IRST)
  - Summer (DST): UTC+4:30 (IRDT)

Qaleh Madreseh Koraei (Persian: قلعه مدرسه کرائی, also Romanized as Qal‘eh-ye Madreseh and Qal‘eh-ye Madraseh; also known as Madraseh and Madreseh) is a village in Tombi Golgir Rural District, Golgir District, Masjed Soleyman County, Khuzestan Province, Iran. At the 2006 census, its population was 74, in 15 families.
