= Avazabad =

Avazabad (Persian: عوض آباد) may refer to:

- Avazabad, Kerman
- Avazabad, Andika, Khuzestan Province
- Avazabad, Tolbozan, Masjed Soleyman County, Khuzestan Province
- Avazabad, Semnan
