= Dam Ab, Masjed Soleyman =

Dam Ab دم اب
- Village
- Location within Iran
- Coordinates: 31°47′33″N 49°27′30″E
- Country: Iran
- Province: Khuzestan
- County: Masjed Soleyman
- Bakhsh: Golgir
- Rural District: Tombi Golgir

Population (2006)
  - Total: 16
- Time zone: UTC+3:30 (IRST)
  - Summer (DST): UTC+4:30 (IRDT)

Dam Ab (Persian: دم اب; also known as Do Āb, Dom Ab, and Dow Āb) is a village in Tombi Golgir Rural District, Golgir District, Masjed Soleyman County, Khuzestan Province, Iran. At the 2006 census, its population was 16, in 5 families.
