= Anbar, Khuzestan =

Village in Khuzestan province, Iran

Anbar Persian: عنبر
- Village
- Location within Iran
- Coordinates: 32°15′54″N 49°00′46″E
- Country: Iran
- Province: Khuzestan
- County: Masjed Soleyman
- District: Anbar
- Rural District: Anbar

Population (2016)
  - Total: 783
- Time zone: UTC+3:30 (IRST)

Anbar (Persian: عنبر) (Note: Also romanized as ʿAnbar; also known as Anbal) is a village in Anbar Rural District of Anbar District, Masjed Soleyman County, Khuzestan province, Iran, serving as capital of both the district and the rural district.

== Demographics ==
=== Population ===
At the time of the 2006 National Census, the village's population was 372 in 76 households, when it was in Jahangiri Rural District of the Central District. The following census in 2011 counted 212 people in 51 households. The 2016 census measured the population of the village as 783 people in 235 households, by which time the village had been separated from the district in the establishment of Anbar District. Anbar was transferred to Anbar Rural District created in the new district. It was the most populous village in its rural district.
