= Sarkot-e Sheyni =

Sarkot-e Sheyni سركت شيني
- Village
- Location within Iran
- Coordinates: 31°55′52″N 49°19′51″E
- Country: Iran
- Province: Khuzestan
- County: Masjed Soleyman
- Bakhsh: Golgir
- Rural District: Tolbozan

Population (2006)
  - Total: 68
- Time zone: UTC+3:30 (IRST)
  - Summer (DST): UTC+4:30 (IRDT)

Sarkot-e Sheyni (Persian: سركت شيني, also Romanized as Sarkot-e Sheynī; also known as Sarkot-e Shehnī and Sarkūt-e Sheynī) is a village in Tolbozan Rural District, Golgir District, Masjed Soleyman County, Khuzestan Province, Iran. At the 2006 census, its population was 68, in 11 families.
