= Tang-e Pol =

Tang-e Pol تنگپل
- Village
- Location within Iran
- Coordinates: 31°43′29″N 49°17′15″E
- Country: Iran
- Province: Khuzestan
- County: Masjed Soleyman
- Bakhsh: Golgir
- Rural District: Tombi Golgir

Population (2006)
  - Total: 22
- Time zone: UTC+3:30 (IRST)
  - Summer (DST): UTC+4:30 (IRDT)

Tang-e Pol (Persian: تنگپل; also known as ‘Alī Zānūbor) is a village in Tombi Golgir Rural District, Golgir District, Masjed Soleyman County, Khuzestan Province, Iran. At the 2006 census, its population was 22, with only 7 families.
