= Baba Zahed =

Baba Zahed or Babazahed (Persian: بابازاهد) may refer to:

- Baba Zahed, Andika
- Baba Zahed, alternate name of Boneh-ye Baba Zahed
- Baba Zahed, Masjed Soleyman
