= Parchak, Khuzestan =

Parchak پرچك
- Village
- Location within Iran
- Coordinates: 32°05′11″N 49°06′55″E
- Country: Iran
- Province: Khuzestan
- County: Masjed Soleyman
- Bakhsh: Central
- Rural District: Jahangiri

Population (2006)
  - Total: 45
- Time zone: UTC+3:30 (IRST)
  - Summer (DST): UTC+4:30 (IRDT)

Parchak (Persian: پرچك, also Romanized as Perchak) is a village in Jahangiri Rural District, in the Central District of Masjed Soleyman County, Khuzestan Province, Iran. At the 2006 census, its population was 45, in 9 families.
