= Qaleh Rak =

Qaleh Rak قلعه راك
- Village
- Location within Iran
- Coordinates: 32°12′45″N 49°04′57″E
- Country: Iran
- Province: Khuzestan
- County: Masjed Soleyman
- Bakhsh: Central
- Rural District: Jahangiri

Population (2006)
  - Total: 54
- Time zone: UTC+3:30 (IRST)
  - Summer (DST): UTC+4:30 (IRDT)

Qaleh Rak (Persian: قلعه راك, also Romanized as Qal‘eh Rāk and Qal‘eh-ye Rāk; also known as Qal‘eh-ye Rāg) is a village in Jahangiri Rural District, in the Central District of Masjed Soleyman County, Khuzestan Province, Iran. At the 2006 census, its population was 54, in 11 families.
