= Tembi =

Tembi may refer to:

== Villages in Iran ==
Tembi or Tombi (Persian: تمبي) may refer to:

- Bazar Tombi, Khuzestan
- Tembi, Khuzestan
- Tombi Golgir, Khuzestan
- Tembi, Masjed Soleyman, Khuzestan
- Tombi, Kohgiluyeh and Boyer-Ahmad

== Other uses ==
- Kingdom of Tembi, a historic kingdom in Mozambique (see History of Maputo)

== See also ==
- Vale of Tempe
