= Konar-e Hashtlik =

Konar-e Hashtlik كنارهشت لك
- Village
- Location within Iran
- Coordinates: 32°12′00″N 49°07′12″E
- Country: Iran
- Province: Khuzestan
- County: Masjed Soleyman
- Bakhsh: Central
- Rural District: Jahangiri

Population (2006)
  - Total: 24
- Time zone: UTC+3:30 (IRST)
  - Summer (DST): UTC+4:30 (IRDT)

Konar-e Hashtlik (Persian: كنارهشت لك, also Romanized as Konār-e Hashtaliḵ) is a village in Jahangiri Rural District, in the Central District of Masjed Soleyman County, Khuzestan Province, Iran. At the 2006 census, its population was 24, in 5 families.
