= Ab Nargesi =

Ab Nargesi اب نرگسي
- Village
- Country: Iran
- Province: Khuzestan
- County: Masjed Soleyman
- Bakhsh: Golgir
- Rural District: Tolbozan

Population (2006)
  - Total: 72
- Time zone: UTC+3:30 (IRST)
  - Summer (DST): UTC+4:30 (IRDT)

Ab Nargesi (Persian: اب نرگسي, also Romanized as Āb Nargesī) is a village in Tolbozan Rural District, Golgir District, Masjed Soleyman County, Khuzestan province, Iran. At the 2006 census, its population was 72, in 13 families.
