= Pagach, Khuzestan =

Village in Khuzestan province, Iran

Pagach Persian: پاگچ
- Village
- Location within Iran
- Coordinates: 31°58′37″N 49°23′54″E
- Country: Iran
- Province: Khuzestan
- County: Masjed Soleyman
- District: Central
- Rural District: Jahangiri-ye Shomali

Population (2016)
  - Total: 147
- Time zone: UTC+3:30 (IRST)

Pagach (Persian: پاگچ) (Note: Also romanized as Pā Gach and Pāgach; also known as Pā Gach-e Godār, and Pā Gach-e Godār Landar) is a village in Jahangiri-ye Shomali Rural District of the Central District of Masjed Soleyman County, Khuzestan province, Iran.

== Demographics ==
=== Population ===
At the time of the 2006 National Census, the village's population was 121 in 30 households, when it was in Tolbozan Rural District. The following census in 2011 counted 68 people in 18 households, by which time the village had been transferred to Jahangiri-ye Shomali Rural District created in the district. The 2016 census measured the population of the village as 147 people in 47 households. It was the most populous village in its rural district.
