= Ab Kaseh =

Ab Kaseh or Ab Kasseh (Persian: ابكاسه) may refer to:

- Ab Kaseh, Khuzestan
- Ab Kaseh, Kohgiluyeh and Boyer-Ahmad
- Ab Kaseh, Boyer-Ahmad, Kohgiluyeh and Boyer-Ahmad Province
- Ab Kaseh, Lorestan
