= Ibrahimi =

Ibrahimi may refer to:

- Ahmed Taleb Ibrahimi (1932–2025), Algerian politician and intellectual, son of Mohamed Bachir El Ibrahimi
- Ibrahim Ibrahimi
- Mohamed Bachir El Ibrahimi (1889–1965), Algerian Islamic scholar
- Ibrahimi, Iran (disambiguation)
- Ebrahimi
