= Gavdaran-e Sofla =

Gavdaran-e Sofla گاوداران سفلي
- Village
- Location within Iran
- Coordinates: 32°08′46″N 49°04′19″E
- Country: Iran
- Province: Khuzestan
- County: Masjed Soleyman
- Bakhsh: Central
- Rural District: Jahangiri

Population (2006)
  - Total: 94
- Time zone: UTC+3:30 (IRST)
  - Summer (DST): UTC+4:30 (IRDT)

Gavdaran-e Sofla (Persian: گاوداران سفلي, also Romanized as Gāvdārān-e Soflá; also known as Gābdārān and Gāvdārān) is a village in Jahangiri Rural District, in the Central District of Masjed Soleyman County, Khuzestan Province, Iran. At the 2006 census, its population was 94, in 21 families.
