= Cheshmeh Abdollah =

Coordinates: 31.7517°N 49.6555°E

Cheshmeh Abdollah چشمه عبداله
- Village
- Interactive map of Cheshmeh Abdollah
- Country: Iran
- Province: Khuzestan
- County: Masjed Soleyman
- Bakhsh: Golgir
- Rural District: Tombi Golgir

Population (2006)
  - Total: 30
- Time zone: UTC+3:30 (IRST)
  - Summer (DST): UTC+4:30 (IRDT)

Cheshmeh Abdollah (Persian: چشمه عبداله, also Romanized as Cheshmeh ʿAbdollah) is a village in Tombi Golgir Rural District, Golgir District, Masjed Soleyman County, Khuzestan Province, Iran. At the 2006 census, its population was 30, in 4 families.
