= Meydan-e Tayyareh =

Meydan-e Tayyareh ميدان طياره
- Village
- Location within Iran
- Coordinates: 31°54′20″N 49°24′35″E
- Country: Iran
- Province: Khuzestan
- County: Masjed Soleyman
- Bakhsh: Golgir
- Rural District: Tolbozan

Population (2006)
  - Total: 46
- Time zone: UTC+3:30 (IRST)
  - Summer (DST): UTC+4:30 (IRDT)

Meydan-e Tayyareh (Persian: ميدان طياره, also Romanized as Meydān-e Ţayyāreh) is a village in Tolbozan Rural District, Golgir District, Masjed Soleyman County, Khuzestan Province, Iran. At the 2006 census, its population was 46, in 12 families.
