= Chah Karmak =

Coordinates: 31.7411°N 49.6878°E

Chah Karmak چاه كرمك
- Village
- Interactive map of Chah Karmak
- Country: Iran
- Province: Khuzestan
- County: Masjed Soleyman
- Bakhsh: Golgir
- Rural District: Tombi Golgir

Population (2006)
  - Total: 24
- Time zone: UTC+3:30 (IRST)
  - Summer (DST): UTC+4:30 (IRDT)

Chah Karmak (Persian: چاه كرمك, also Romanized as Chāh Karmak) is a village in Tombi Golgir Rural District, Golgir District, Masjed Soleyman County, Khuzestan Province, Iran. At the 2006 census, its population was 24, in 5 families.
