= Cheshmeh Zaluvak =

Cheshmeh Zaluvak چشمه زالوك
- Village
- Location within Iran
- Coordinates: 31°59′29″N 49°14′01″E
- Country: Iran
- Province: Khuzestan
- County: Masjed Soleyman
- Bakhsh: Central
- Rural District: Jahangiri

Population (2006)
  - Total: 146
- Time zone: UTC+3:30 (IRST)
  - Summer (DST): UTC+4:30 (IRDT)

Cheshmeh Zaluvak (Persian: چشمه زالوك, also Romanized as Cheshmeh Zālūvak) is a village in Jahangiri Rural District, in the Central District of Masjed Soleyman County, Khuzestan Province, Iran. At the 2006 census, its population was 146, in 27 families.
