= Par Neveshteh-ye Yek =

Par Neveshteh-ye Yek پرنوشته يك
- Village
- Location within Iran
- Coordinates: 32°11′00″N 49°06′21″E
- Country: Iran
- Province: Khuzestan
- County: Masjed Soleyman
- Bakhsh: Central
- Rural District: Jahangiri

Population (2006)
  - Total: 16
- Time zone: UTC+3:30 (IRST)
  - Summer (DST): UTC+4:30 (IRDT)

Par Neveshteh-ye Yek (Persian: پرنوشته يك; also known as Par Neveshteh) is a village in Jahangiri Rural District, in the Central District of Masjed Soleyman County, Khuzestan Province, Iran. At the 2006 census, its population was 16, in 5 families.
