= Ney Nardeban =

Ney Nardeban ني نردبان
- Village
- Location within Iran
- Coordinates: 31°51′37″N 49°17′20″E
- Country: Iran
- Province: Khuzestan
- County: Masjed Soleyman
- Bakhsh: Golgir
- Rural District: Tombi Golgir

Population (2006)
  - Total: 12
- Time zone: UTC+3:30 (IRST)
  - Summer (DST): UTC+4:30 (IRDT)

Ney Nardeban (Persian: ني نردبان, also Romanized as Ney Nardebān and Ney Nardobān; also known as Ney Nardebām) is a village in Tombi Golgir Rural District, Golgir District, Masjed Soleyman County, Khuzestan Province, Iran. At the 2006 census, its population was 12, in 4 families.
