= Avaz Ali Najafqoli =

Avaz Ali Najafqoli عوضعلي نجفقلي
- Village
- Country: Iran
- Province: Khuzestan
- County: Masjed Soleyman
- Bakhsh: Golgir
- Rural District: Tombi Golgir

Population (2006)
  - Total: 56
- Time zone: UTC+3:30 (IRST)
  - Summer (DST): UTC+4:30 (IRDT)

Avaz Ali Najafqoli (Persian: عوضعلي نجفقلي, also Romanized as ʿAvaz̤ ʿAlī Najafqolī) is a village in Tombi Golgir Rural District, Golgir District, Masjed Soleyman County, Khuzestan Province, Iran. At the 2006 census, its population was 56, in 8 families.
