= Batvand =

Batvand بتوند
- Village
- Location within Iran
- Coordinates: 32°00′25″N 49°07′25″E
- Country: Iran
- Province: Khuzestan
- County: Masjed Soleyman
- Bakhsh: Central
- Rural District: Jahangiri

Population (2006)
  - Total: 242
- Time zone: UTC+3:30 (IRST)
  - Summer (DST): UTC+4:30 (IRDT)

Batvand (Persian: بتوند, also Romanized as Batwand) is a village in Jahangiri Rural District, in the Central District of Masjed Soleyman County, Khuzestan Province, Iran. At the 2006 census, its population was 242, in 51 families.
