= Zalu Ab =

Zalu Ab or Zaluab (Persian: زالواب) may refer to:

- Zalu Ab, Ilam
- Zalu Ab, Kermanshah
- Zalu Ab Rural District, in Kermanshah Province

== See also ==
- Ab Zalu (disambiguation)
