= Konjadkar =

Konjadkar or Konjed Kar (Persian: كنجدكار) may refer to:

- Konjadkar, Bagh-e Malek
- Konjed Kar, Masjed Soleyman
