= Sabzabad, Tombi Golgir =

Sabzabad سبزاباد
- Village
- Location within Iran
- Coordinates: 31°46′55″N 49°21′34″E
- Country: Iran
- Province: Khuzestan
- County: Masjed Soleyman
- Bakhsh: Golgir
- Rural District: Tombi Golgir

Population (2006)
  - Total: 41
- Time zone: UTC+3:30 (IRST)
  - Summer (DST): UTC+4:30 (IRDT)

Sabzabad (Persian: سبزاباد, also Romanized as Sabzābād and Sabzābād-e Yekmeheh) is a village in Tombi Golgir Rural District, Golgir District, Masjed Soleyman County, Khuzestan Province, Iran. At the 2006 census, its population was 41, in 7 families.
