= Bardneshandeh, Masjed Soleyman =

Bardneshandeh بردنشانده
- Village
- Location within Iran
- Coordinates: 32°14′22″N 49°02′15″E
- Country: Iran
- Province: Khuzestan
- County: Masjed Soleyman
- Bakhsh: Central
- Rural District: Jahangiri

Population (2006)
  - Total: 29
- Time zone: UTC+3:30 (IRST)
  - Summer (DST): UTC+4:30 (IRDT)

Bardneshandeh (Persian: بردنشانده, also Romanized as Bardneshāndeh and Bard Neshāndeh; also known as Barneshāndeh and Gorgakī) is a village in Jahangiri Rural District, in the Central District of Masjed Soleyman County, Khuzestan Province, Iran. At the 2006 census, its population was 29, in 5 families.
