= Jeh Jeh, Masjed Soleyman =

Jeh Jeh جه جه
- Village
- Location within Iran
- Coordinates: 31°47′16″N 49°15′02″E
- Country: Iran
- Province: Khuzestan
- County: Masjed Soleyman
- Bakhsh: Golgir
- Rural District: Tombi Golgir

Population (2006)
  - Total: 9
- Time zone: UTC+3:30 (IRST)
  - Summer (DST): UTC+4:30 (IRDT)

Jeh Jeh (Persian: جه جه, also Romanized as Jahjah) is a village in Tombi Golgir Rural District, Golgir District, Masjed Soleyman County, Khuzestan Province, Iran. At the 2006 census, its population was 9, in 9 families.
