= Baba Zeyd =

Baba Zeyd or Baba Zaid or Baba Zayed (Persian: بابازيد) may refer to:

- Baba Zeyd, Kermanshah
- Baba Zeyd, Khuzestan
- Baba Zeyd, Lorestan
