= Rezaabad, Khuzestan =

Village in Khuzestan province, Iran

Rezaabad Persian: رضااباد
- Village
- Location within Iran
- Coordinates: 31°57′45″N 49°21′54″E
- Country: Iran
- Province: Khuzestan
- County: Masjed Soleyman
- District: Central
- Rural District: Jahangiri-ye Shomali

Population (2016)
  - Total: 135
- Time zone: UTC+3:30 (IRST)

Rezaabad (Persian: رضااباد) (Note: Also romanized as Reẕāābād) is a village in, and the capital of, Jahangiri-ye Shomali Rural District of the Central District of Masjed Soleyman County, Khuzestan province, Iran. It was the capital of Tolbozan Rural District until its capital was transferred to the village of Qasemabad.

== Demographics ==
=== Population ===
At the time of the 2006 National Census, the village's population was 104 in 24 households, when it was in Tolbozan Rural District. The following census in 2011 counted 77 people in 16 households, by which time the village had been transferred to Jahangiri-ye Shomali Rural District created in the district. The 2016 census measured the population of the village as 135 people in 39 households.
