= Seliran-e Olya =

Seliran-e Olya سليران عليا
- Village
- Location within Iran
- Coordinates: 32°09′19″N 49°11′42″E
- Country: Iran
- Province: Khuzestan
- County: Masjed Soleyman
- Bakhsh: Central
- Rural District: Jahangiri

Population (2006)
  - Total: 70
- Time zone: UTC+3:30 (IRST)
  - Summer (DST): UTC+4:30 (IRDT)

Seliran-e Olya (Persian: سليران عليا, also Romanized as Selīrān-e ‘Olyā; also known as Selīrān) is a village in Jahangiri Rural District, in the Central District of Masjed Soleyman County, Khuzestan Province, Iran. At the 2006 census, its population was 70, in 10 families.
