= Baba Zahed, Masjed Soleyman =

Baba Zahed بابازاهد
- Village
- Location within Iran
- Coordinates: 32°14′34″N 49°03′35″E
- Country: Iran
- Province: Khuzestan
- County: Masjed Soleyman
- Bakhsh: Central
- Rural District: Jahangiri

Population (2006)
  - Total: 18
- Time zone: UTC+3:30 (IRST)
  - Summer (DST): UTC+4:30 (IRDT)

Baba Zahed (Persian: بابازاهد, also Romanized as Bābā Zāhed and Bābāzāhed) is a village in Jahangiri Rural District, in the Central District of Masjed Soleyman County, Khuzestan Province, Iran. At the 2006 census, its population was 18, in 4 families.
