= Haft Shahidan =

Village in Khuzestan province, Iran

Haft Shahidan Persian: هفت شهيدان
- Village
- Location within Iran
- Coordinates: 32°08′00″N 49°04′03″E
- Country: Iran
- Province: Khuzestan
- County: Masjed Soleyman
- District: Central
- Rural District: Jahangiri

Population (2016)
  - Total: 552
- Time zone: UTC+3:30 (IRST)

Haft Shahidan (Persian: هفت شهيدان) (Note: Also romanized as Haft Shahīdān; also known as Haft Tanūn, Pīr Gāh, Pīrgāh-e Haft Shāhedan, Pīrgāh-i-Haft Shahīdān, and Pīrqā) is a village in, and the capital of, Jahangiri Rural District of the Central District of Masjed Soleyman County, Khuzestan province, Iran.

== Demographics ==
=== Population ===
At the time of the 2006 National Census, the village's population was 395 in 69 households. The following census in 2011 counted 435 people in 93 households. The 2016 census measured the population of the village as 552 people in 148 households. It was the most populous village in its rural district.
