= Ab Zalu-ye Arab =

Ab Zalu-ye Arab اب زالوعرب
- Village
- Location within Iran
- Coordinates: 32°13′55″N 49°04′58″E
- Country: Iran
- Province: Khuzestan
- County: Masjed Soleyman
- Bakhsh: Central
- Rural District: Jahangiri

Population (2006)
  - Total: 96
- Time zone: UTC+3:30 (IRST)
  - Summer (DST): UTC+4:30 (IRDT)

Ab Zalu-ye Arab (Persian: اب زالوعرب, also Romanized as Āb Zālū-ye 'Arab; also known as Ab Zaloo Jahangiri, Āb Zālū, Āqā Bahrām, Nomreh Panj, and Nomreh-ye Panj) is a village in Jahangiri Rural District, in the Central District of Masjed Soleyman County, Khuzestan province, Iran. At the 2006 census, its population was 96, in 19 families.
