= Bardneshandeh =

Bardneshandeh or Bard Neshandeh (Persian: بردنشانده) may refer to:

- Bardneshandeh, Izeh
- Bardneshandeh, Masjed Soleyman
- Bardneshandeh Cheshmeh-ye Aynean, Masjed Soleyman County
