= Seliran-e Sofla =

Seliran-e Sofla سليران سفلي
- Village
- Location within Iran
- Coordinates: 32°09′56″N 49°11′50″E
- Country: Iran
- Province: Khuzestan
- County: Masjed Soleyman
- Bakhsh: Central
- Rural District: Jahangiri

Population (2006)
  - Total: 44
- Time zone: UTC+3:30 (IRST)
  - Summer (DST): UTC+4:30 (IRDT)

Seliran-e Sofla (Persian: سليران سفلي, also Romanized as Selīrān-e Soflá and Salīrān Soflá; also known as Salīrān Pā’īn) is a village in Jahangiri Rural District, in the Central District of Masjed Soleyman County, Khuzestan Province, Iran. At the 2006 census, its population was 44, in 6 families.
