= Qaleh Madreseh =

Qaleh Madreseh or Qaleh-ye Madreseh or Qaleh-ye Madraseh (Persian: قلعه مدرسه) may refer to:

- Qaleh-ye Madraseh, Chaharmahal and Bakhtiari
- Qaleh Madreseh, Behbahan, Khuzestan Province
- Qaleh-ye Madreseh, Masjed Soleyman, Khuzestan Province
