= Laderazi =

Laderazi لادرازي
- Village
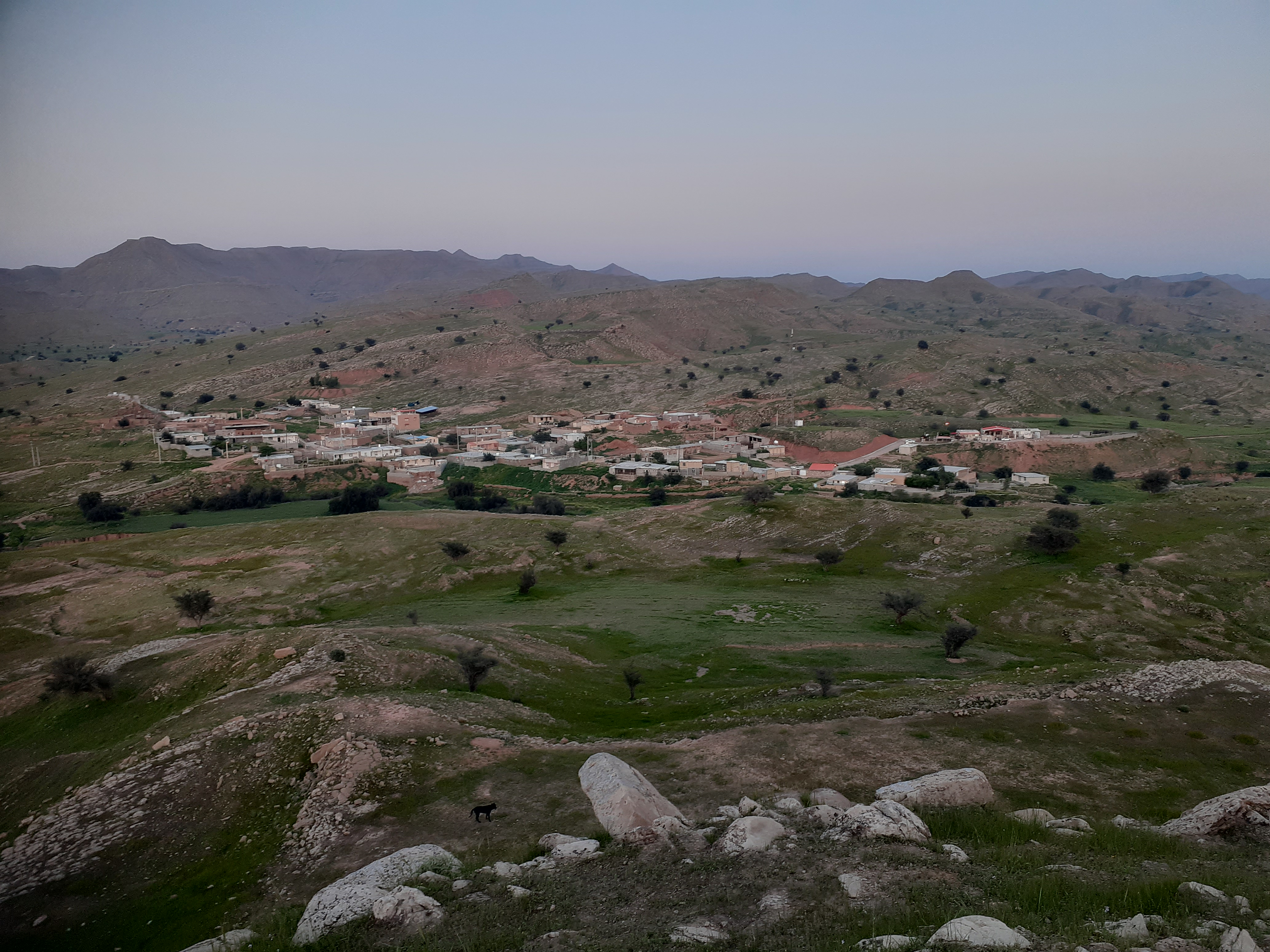

- Location within Iran
- Coordinates: 32°04′42″N 49°11′32″E
- Country: Iran
- Province: Khuzestan
- County: Masjed Soleyman
- Bakhsh: Central
- Rural District: Jahangiri

Population (2006)
  - Total: 49
- Time zone: UTC+3:30 (IRST)
  - Summer (DST): UTC+4:30 (IRDT)

Laderazi (Persian: لادرازي, also Romanized as Lāderāzī; also known as Chahsmen Ali, Chashmeh-i-‘Ali, Cheshmeh ‘Alī, and Cheshmeh ‘Alī Mūchkān) is a village in Jahangiri Rural District, in the Central District of Masjed Soleyman County, Khuzestan Province, Iran.

According to 2006 census, its population was 49, in 11 families.
