= Anbargah, Khuzestan =

Anbargah انبارگاه
- Village
- Location within Iran
- Coordinates: 31°59′26″N 49°31′06″E
- Country: Iran
- Province: Khuzestan
- County: Masjed Soleyman
- Bakhsh: Golgir
- Rural District: Tolbozan

Population (2006)
  - Total: 102
- Time zone: UTC+3:30 (IRST)
  - Summer (DST): UTC+4:30 (IRDT)

Anbargah (Persian: انبارگاه, also Romanized as Ānbārgāh) is a village in Tolbozan Rural District, Golgir District, Masjed Soleyman County, Khuzestan Province, Iran. At the 2006 census, its population was 102, in 19 families.
