= Anbargah =

Anbargah (Persian: انبارگاه) may refer to:

- Anbargah, Khuzestan
- Anbargah, Kohgiluyeh and Boyer-Ahmad
