= Tombi Golgir =

Tombi Golgir تمبي گلگير
- Village
- Location within Iran
- Coordinates: 31°49′22″N 49°27′28″E
- Country: Iran
- Province: Khuzestan
- County: Masjed Soleyman
- Bakhsh: Golgir
- Rural District: Tombi Golgir

Population (2006)
  - Total: 241
- Time zone: UTC+3:30 (IRST)
  - Summer (DST): UTC+4:30 (IRDT)

Tombi Golgir (Persian: تمبي گلگير, also Romanized as Tombī Golgīr and Tembī Gelgīr; also known as Tambīān, Tembī, Tembiūn, Temblun, and Tombī) is a village in Tombi Golgir Rural District, Golgir District, Masjed Soleyman County, Khuzestan Province, Iran. At the 2006 census, its population was 241, in 38 families.
