= Cheshmeh Ali-ye Kayedan =

Village in Khuzestan province, Iran

Cheshmeh Ali-ye Kayedan Persian: چشمه علي كايدان
- Village
- Location within Iran
- Coordinates: 32°06′41″N 49°10′54″E
- Country: Iran
- Province: Khuzestan
- County: Masjed Soleyman
- District: Central
- Rural District: Jahangiri

Population (2016)
  - Total: Below reporting threshold
- Time zone: UTC+3:30 (IRST)

Cheshmeh Ali-ye Kayedan (Persian: چشمه علي كايدان) (Note: Also romanized as Cheshmeh ‘Alī-ye Kāyedān; also known as ‘Alīābād-e Kābedān, Chashmeh-i-‘Ali, Chashmeh-ye ‘Alī, Cheshmeh ‘Alī-ye Mūchegān, and Cheshmeh-ye ‘Alī) is a village in Jahangiri Rural District of the Central District in Masjed Soleyman County, Khuzestan province, Iran.

== Demographics ==
=== Population ===
At the time of the 2006 National Census, the village's population was 46 in 7 households. The following censuses in 2011 and 2016 showed a population below the reporting threshold.
