= Bazar Tombi =

Village in Khuzestan province, Iran

Bazar Tombi Persian: بازار تمبي
- Village
- Location within Iran
- Coordinates: 31°55′36″N 49°16′24″E
- Country: Iran
- Province: Khuzestan
- County: Masjed Soleyman
- District: Golgir
- Rural District: Tembi Golgir

Population (2016)
  - Total: 708
- Time zone: UTC+3:30 (IRST)

Bazar Tombi (Persian: بازار تمبي) (Note: Also romanized as Bāzār Tombī) is a village in Tembi Golgir Rural District of Golgir District, Masjed Soleyman County, Khuzestan province, Iran.

== Demographics ==
=== Population ===
At the time of the 2006 National Census, the village's population was 937 in 222 households, when it was in the Central District. The following census in 2011 counted 751 people in 175 households, by which time the rural district had been separated from the district in the formation of Golgir District. The 2016 census measured the population of the village as 708 people in 194 households. It was the most populous village in its rural district.
