= Nargesi, Masjed Soleyman =

Nargesi نرگسي
- Village
- Location within Iran
- Coordinates: 31°55′55″N 49°32′56″E
- Country: Iran
- Province: Khuzestan
- County: Masjed Soleyman
- Bakhsh: Golgir
- Rural District: Tolbozan

Population (2006)
  - Total: 71
- Time zone: UTC+3:30 (IRST)
  - Summer (DST): UTC+4:30 (IRDT)

Nargesi (Persian: نرگسي, also Romanized as Nargesī; also known as Narges and Nargesi Morgha) is a village in Tolbozan Rural District, Golgir District, Masjed Soleyman County, Khuzestan Province, Iran. At the 2006 census, its population was 71, in 16 families.
