= Sabzabad-e Sofla =

Sabzabad-e Sofla سبزابادسفلي
- Village
- Location within Iran
- Coordinates: 31°43′53″N 49°27′04″E
- Country: Iran
- Province: Khuzestan
- County: Masjed Soleyman
- Bakhsh: Golgir
- Rural District: Tombi Golgir

Population (2006)
  - Total: 70
- Time zone: UTC+3:30 (IRST)
  - Summer (DST): UTC+4:30 (IRDT)

Sabzabad-e Sofla (Persian: سبزابادسفلي, also Romanized as Sabzābād-e Soflá; also known as Sabzābād and Sabzābād-e Kūchek) is a village in Tombi Golgir Rural District, Golgir District, Masjed Soleyman County, Khuzestan Province, Iran. At the 2006 census, its population was 70, in 16 families.
