= Seyyed Morad, Khuzestan =

Seyyed Morad سيدمراد
- Village
- Location within Iran
- Coordinates: 31°59′51″N 49°12′42″E
- Country: Iran
- Province: Khuzestan
- County: Masjed Soleyman
- Bakhsh: Central
- Rural District: Jahangiri

Population (2006)
  - Total: 53
- Time zone: UTC+3:30 (IRST)
  - Summer (DST): UTC+4:30 (IRDT)

Seyyed Morad (Persian: سيدمراد, also Romanized as Seyyed Morād; also known as Sādāt-e Ḩayāt Gheyb and Sādāt-e Ḩayāt Gheybī) is a village in Jahangiri Rural District, in the Central District of Masjed Soleyman County, Khuzestan Province, Iran. At the 2006 census, its population was 53, in 10 families.
