= Nargesabad =

Nargesabad (Persian: نرگس اباد) may refer to:

- Nargesabad, East Azerbaijan
- Nargesabad, Fars
