= Avazabad, Tolbozan =

Avazabad عوض اباد
- Village
- Location within Iran
- Coordinates: 31°57′33″N 49°21′44″E
- Country: Iran
- Province: Khuzestan
- County: Masjed Soleyman
- Bakhsh: Golgir
- Rural District: Tolbozan

Population (2006)
  - Total: 84
- Time zone: UTC+3:30 (IRST)
  - Summer (DST): UTC+4:30 (IRDT)

Avazabad (Persian: عوض اباد, also Romanized as ‘Avaẕābād) is a village in Tolbozan Rural District, Golgir District, Masjed Soleyman County, Khuzestan Province, Iran. At the 2006 census, its population was 84, in 19 families.
