= Ab Zehlu =

Ab Zehlu or Ab Zahlu (Persian: آبزهلو) may refer to places in Iran:

- Ab Zehlu, Andika
- Ab Zahlu, Izeh

== See also ==
- Ab Zalu (disambiguation)
