= Goli Khun =

Goli Khun گلي خون
- Village
- Location within Iran
- Coordinates: 31°53′17″N 49°12′12″E
- Country: Iran
- Province: Khuzestan
- County: Masjed Soleyman
- Bakhsh: Golgir
- Rural District: Tombi Golgir

Population (2006)
  - Total: 25
- Time zone: UTC+3:30 (IRST)
  - Summer (DST): UTC+4:30 (IRDT)

Goli Khun (Persian: گلي خون, also Romanized as Golī Khūn; also known as Golī Khān, Kolī Khān, and Qolī Khān) is a village in Tombi Golgir Rural District, Golgir District, Masjed Soleyman County, Khuzestan Province, Iran. At the 2006 census, its population was 25, in 8 families.
