= Narges-e Batuli =

Narges-e Batuli نرگس بطولي
- Village
- Location within Iran
- Coordinates: 31°56′00″N 49°32′00″E
- Country: Iran
- Province: Khuzestan
- County: Masjed Soleyman
- Bakhsh: Golgir
- Rural District: Tolbozan

Population (2006)
  - Total: 16
- Time zone: UTC+3:30 (IRST)
  - Summer (DST): UTC+4:30 (IRDT)

Narges-e Batuli (Persian: نرگس بطولي, also Romanized as Narges-e Baţūlī; also known as Nargesī-ye Baţūlī) is a village in Tolbozan Rural District, Golgir District, Masjed Soleyman County, Khuzestan Province, Iran. At the 2006 census, its population was 16, in 5 families.
