= Jehjeh =

Jehjeh or Jeh Jeh or Jahjah (Persian: جه جه) may refer to:

- Jehjeh, Izeh
- Jeh Jeh, Masjed Soleyman
