= Ab Zalu-ye Bahram =

Ab Zalu-ye Bahram اب زالوبهرام
- Village
- Location within Iran
- Coordinates: 32°12′34″N 49°06′19″E
- Country: Iran
- Province: Khuzestan
- County: Masjed Soleyman
- Bakhsh: Central
- Rural District: Jahangiri

Population (2006)
  - Total: 22
- Time zone: UTC+3:30 (IRST)
  - Summer (DST): UTC+4:30 (IRDT)

Ab Zalu-ye Bahram (Persian: اب زالوبهرام, also Romanized as Āb Zālū-ye Bahrām; also known as Āb Zālū and Āb Zālū-ye Āqā Bahrām) is a village in Jahangiri Rural District, in the Central District of Masjed Soleyman County, Khuzestan province, Iran. At the 2006 census, its population was 22, in 4 families.
