= Seliran =

Seliran or Saliran (Persian: سليران) may refer to:

- Seliran-e Olya
- Seliran-e Sofla
