= Tombi (disambiguation) =

Tombi may refer to:

== Places ==
- Tembi (disambiguation), multiple places in Iran
- Tömbi, Estonia

== People ==
- Tombi (given name), people with the given name Tombi

== Other uses ==
- Ipi Tombi, a 1974 musical
- Tombi!, a 1997 PlayStation video game
- Tombi! 2, a 1999 PlayStation video game
