= Zeylabi Rural District =

Rural district in Khuzestan province, Iran

Zeylabi Rural District Persian: دهستان ذیلابی
- Rural District
- Location within Iran
- Coordinates: 32°10′09″N 49°08′27″E
- Country: Iran
- Province: Khuzestan
- County: Masjed Soleyman
- District: Anbar
- Capital: Parzard

Population (2016)
  - Total: 783
- Time zone: UTC+3:30 (IRST)

Zeylabi Rural District (Persian: دهستان ذیلابی) is in Anbar District of Masjed Soleyman County, Khuzestan province, Iran. Its capital is the village of Parzard.

== History ==
After the 2011 National Census, villages were separated from the Central District in the formation of Anbar District, and Zeylabi Rural District was created in the new district.

== Demographics ==
=== Population ===
At the time of the 2016 census, the rural district's population was 783 in 256 households. The most populous of its 27 villages was Konjed Kar, with 128 people.
