= Golgir =

City in Khuzestan province, Iran

Golgir Persian: گلگير
- City
- Location within Iran
- Coordinates: 31°45′51″N 49°29′53″E
- Country: Iran
- Province: Khuzestan
- County: Masjed Soleyman
- District: Golgir

Population (2016)
  - Total: 1,089
- Time zone: UTC+3:30 (IRST)

Golgir (Persian: گلگير) (Note: Also romanized as Golgīr) is a city in, and the capital of, Golgir District of Masjed Soleyman County, Khuzestan province, Iran. It also serves as the administrative center for Tembi Golgir Rural District.

== Demographics ==
=== Population ===
At the time of the 2006 National Census, Golgir's population was 1,206 in 239 households, when it was a village in Tembi Golgir Rural District of the Central District. The following census in 2011 counted 1,013 people in 240 households, by which time the rural district had been separated from the district in the formation of Golgir District. The 2016 census measured the population as 1,089 people in 288 households, when Golgir had been elevated to the status of a city.
