= Quli Khan =

Quli Khan, Qulī Khān, Qoli Khan, Qolī Khān is another name of Goli Khun.

== See also ==
- Quli (disambiguation)
- Khan (disambiguation)
