= Bidabad =

Bidabad (Persian: بيداباد) may refer to:

- Bidabad, Isfahan
- Bidabad, Khuzestan
