= Seyyed Morad =

Seyyed Morad (Persian: سيدمراد) may refer to:

- Seyyed Morad, Khuzestan
- Seyyed Morad, South Khorasan
