= Anbar Rural District =

Rural district in Khuzestan province, Iran

Anbar Rural District Persian: دهستان عنبر
- Rural District
- Location within Iran
- Coordinates: 32°14′49″N 49°03′33″E
- Country: Iran
- Province: Khuzestan
- County: Masjed Soleyman
- District: Anbar
- Capital: Anbar

Population (2016)
  - Total: 1,262
- Time zone: UTC+3:30 (IRST)

Anbar Rural District (Persian: دهستان عنبر) is in Anbar District of Masjed Soleyman County, Khuzestan province, Iran. Its capital is the village of Anbar.

== History ==
After the 2011 National Census, villages were separated from the Central District in the establishment of Anbar District, and Anbar Rural District was created in the new district.

== Demographics ==
=== Population ===
At the time of the 2016 census, the rural district's population was 1,262 in 388 households. The most populous of its 20 villages was Anbar, with 783 people.
