= Ebrahimi, Iran =

Ebrahimi or Ibrahimi (Persian: ابراهيمي) may refer to:

- Ebrahimi, Hormozgan
- Ebrahimi, Khuzestan
- Ebrahimi, Razavi Khorasan
- Ebrahimi, South Khorasan
