= Ab Zalu-ye Sofla-ye Neqareh Khaneh =

Ab Zalu-ye Sofla-ye Neqareh Khaneh اب زالوسفلي نقاره خانه
- Village
- Location within Iran
- Coordinates: 30°46′05″N 51°21′59″E
- Country: Iran
- Province: Kohgiluyeh and Boyer-Ahmad
- County: Dana
- Bakhsh: Kabgian
- Rural District: Kabgian

Population (2006)
  - Total: 36
- Time zone: UTC+3:30 (IRST)
  - Summer (DST): UTC+4:30 (IRDT)

Ab Zalu-ye Sofla-ye Neqareh Khaneh (Persian: اب زالوسفلي نقاره خانه, also Romanized as Āb Zālū-ye Soflá-ye Neqāreh Khāneh; also known as Āb Zālū-ye Pā’īn, Āb Zālū-ye Soflá, and Belī Angūrī) is a village in Kabgian Rural District, Kabgian District, Dana County, Kohgiluyeh and Boyer-Ahmad Province, Iran. At the 2006 census, its population was 36, in 10 families.
