= Nargesi, Kohgiluyeh and Boyer-Ahmad =

Nargesi نرگسي
- Village
- Location within Iran
- Coordinates: 30°30′41″N 51°23′13″E
- Country: Iran
- Province: Kohgiluyeh and Boyer-Ahmad
- County: Boyer-Ahmad
- Bakhsh: Central
- Rural District: Sepidar

Population (2006)
  - Total: 57
- Time zone: UTC+3:30 (IRST)
  - Summer (DST): UTC+4:30 (IRDT)

Nargesi (Persian: نرگسي, also Romanized as Nargesī) is a village in Sepidar Rural District, in the Central District of Boyer-Ahmad County, Kohgiluyeh and Boyer-Ahmad Province, Iran. At the 2006 census, its population was 57, in 12 families.
