= Qaleh Madreseh, Behbahan =

Qaleh Madreseh قلعه مدرسه
- Village
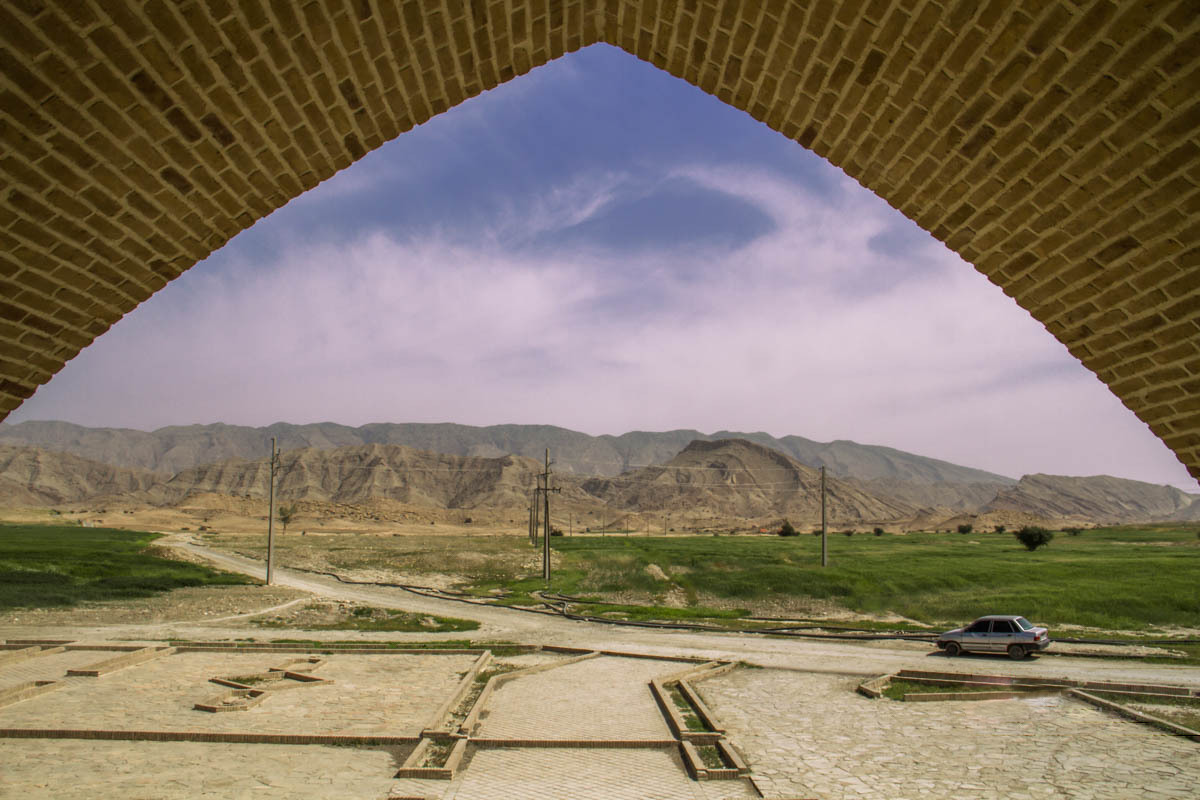

- Location within Iran
- Coordinates: 30°32′07″N 50°27′20″E
- Country: Iran
- Province: Khuzestan
- County: Behbahan
- Bakhsh: Central
- Rural District: Howmeh

Population (2006)
  - Total: 201
- Time zone: UTC+3:30 (IRST)
  - Summer (DST): UTC+4:30 (IRDT)

Qaleh Madreseh (Persian: قلعه مدرسه, also Romanized as Qal‘eh Madreseh) is a village in Howmeh Rural District, in the Central District of Behbahan County, Khuzestan Province, Iran. At the 2006 census, its population was 201, in 45 families.
