= Sabzabad, Neyriz =

Sabzabad سبزاباد
- Village
- Location within Iran
- Coordinates: 28°53′22″N 54°57′42″E
- Country: Iran
- Province: Fars
- County: Neyriz
- Bakhsh: Qatruyeh
- Rural District: Rizab

Population (2006)
  - Total: 149
- Time zone: UTC+3:30 (IRST)
  - Summer (DST): UTC+4:30 (IRDT)

Sabzabad (Persian: سبزاباد, also Romanized as Sabzābād) is a village in Rizab Rural District, Qatruyeh District, Neyriz County, Fars province, Iran. At the 2006 census, its population was 149, in 36 families.
