= Nargesi-ye Deli Qayid Shafi =

Nargesi-ye Deli Qayid Shafi نرگسي دلي قايدشفيع
- Village
- Country: Iran
- Province: Fars
- County: Mamasani
- Bakhsh: Central
- Rural District: Javid-e Mahuri

Population (2006)
  - Total: 28
- Time zone: UTC+3:30 (IRST)
  - Summer (DST): UTC+4:30 (IRDT)

Nargesi-ye Deli Qayid Shafi (Persian: نرگسي دلي قايدشفيع, also Romanized as Nargesī-ye Delī Qāyīd Shafī') is a village in Javid-e Mahuri Rural District, in the Central District of Mamasani County, Fars province, Iran. At the 2006 census, its population was 28, in 8 families.
