= Nargesabad, East Azerbaijan =

Nargesabad نرگس اباد
- Village
- Location within Iran
- Coordinates: 37°12′53″N 46°59′43″E
- Country: Iran
- Province: East Azerbaijan
- County: Charuymaq
- Bakhsh: Central
- Rural District: Varqeh

Population (2006)
  - Total: 136
- Time zone: UTC+3:30 (IRST)
  - Summer (DST): UTC+4:30 (IRDT)

Nargesabad (Persian: نرگس اباد, also Romanized as Nargesābād) is a village in Varqeh Rural District, in the Central District of Charuymaq County, East Azerbaijan Province, Iran. At the 2006 census, its population was 136, in 32 families.
