= Jahangiri-ye Sofla =

Jahangiri-ye Sofla جهانگيري سفلي
- Village
- Location within Iran
- Coordinates: 30°41′26″N 48°45′50″E
- Country: Iran
- Province: Khuzestan
- County: Shadegan
- Bakhsh: Central
- Rural District: Buzi

Population (2006)
  - Total: 434
- Time zone: UTC+3:30 (IRST)
  - Summer (DST): UTC+4:30 (IRDT)

Jahangiri-ye Sofla (Persian: جهانگيري سفلي, also Romanized as Jahāngīrī-ye Soflá; also known as Jahāngīrī-ye Pā’īn) is a village in Buzi Rural District, in the Central District of Shadegan County, Khuzestan Province, Iran. At the 2006 census, its population was 434, in 87 families.
