= Ibrahim Ibrahimi =

ابراهيم ابراهيمي Ibrahim Ibrahimi
- Born: 1972; Nangarhar Province, Afghanistan
- Genres: Tabla; Classical music
- Occupation: Musician / Singer
- Labels: Various

Ibrahim Ibrahimi (Pashto: ابراهيم ابراهيمي), 1972, is an Afghan musician and educator, who fled his country to France on 20 August 2021 to avoid the massacres of the Taliban.

== Life ==
Born in 1972 in Nangarhar province, he comes from a family of musicians. Actually two of his sons are musicians too. He graduated from Mia Sahib Qader Bakhsh High School of Music and studied with ustad Sabz Ali Khan.

He mainly plays the tabla and performs in both traditional and classical musical groups, pop, jazz or rock. Before his escape, he taught composition at the National Institute of Music of Afghanistan, also working on Afghan radio and television (RTA).

On August 20, 2021, Ibrahim Ibrahimi left his country to take refuge in France, without any of his tools, with sixteen members of his family.

He performed in Iran, India, Azerbaijan and Turkey. After leaving Afghanistan, he performed in Belgium (École d'art d'Uccle) and France (Théâtre Sainte Marie d'en Bas in Grenoble).
