= Ab Kaseh, Kohgiluyeh and Boyer-Ahmad =

Ab Kaseh اب كاسه
- Village
- Location within Iran
- Coordinates: 30°37′56″N 50°31′13″E
- Country: Iran
- Province: Kohgiluyeh and Boyer-Ahmad
- County: Kohgiluyeh
- Bakhsh: Central
- Rural District: Dehdasht-e Gharbi

Population (2006)
  - Total: 172
- Time zone: UTC+3:30 (IRST)
  - Summer (DST): UTC+4:30 (IRDT)

Ab Kaseh (Persian: اب كاسه, also Romanized as Āb Kāseh) is a village in Dehdasht-e Gharbi Rural District, in the Central District of Kohgiluyeh County, Kohgiluyeh and Boyer-Ahmad Province, Iran. According to the 2006 census, it had a population of 172 in 36 families.
