= Jehjeh, Izeh =

Jehjeh جه جه
- village
- Location within Iran
- Coordinates: 31°47′56″N 49°44′15″E
- Country: Iran
- Province: Khuzestan
- County: Izeh
- Bakhsh: Central
- Rural District: Holayjan

Population (2006)
  - Total: 103
- Time zone: UTC+3:30 (IRST)
  - Summer (DST): UTC+4:30 (IRDT)

Jehjeh (Persian: جه جه; also known as Chehcheh, Chejeh, Jah Jah Halaliyan, and Jejeh) is a village in Holayjan Rural District, in the Central District of Izeh County, Khuzestan Province, Iran. At the 2006 census, its population was 103, in 20 families. kai gamw re file goustarw
