= Ab Kaseh-ye Tal Deraz =

Village in Kohgiluyeh and Boyer-Ahmad, Iran

Ab Kaseh-ye Tal Deraz اب كاسه تل دراز
- Village
- Location within Iran
- Coordinates: 30°58′20″N 50°57′00″E
- Country: Iran
- Province: Kohgiluyeh and Boyer-Ahmad
- County: Boyer-Ahmad
- Bakhsh: Ludab
- Rural District: Ludab

Population (2006)
  - Total: 50
- Time zone: UTC+3:30 (IRST)
  - Summer (DST): UTC+4:30 (IRDT)

Ab Kaseh-ye Tal Deraz (Persian: اب كاسه تل دراز, also Romanized as Āb Kāseh-ye Tal Derāz; also known as Āb Kāseh) is a village in Ludab Rural District, Ludab District, Boyer-Ahmad County, Kohgiluyeh and Boyer-Ahmad Province, Iran. At the 2006 census, its population was 50, in 9 families.
