= Ab Zalu-ye Vosta-ye Neqareh Khaneh =

Ab Zalu-ye Vosta-ye Neqareh Khaneh اب زالووسطي نقاره خانه
- Village
- Location within Iran
- Coordinates: 30°45′48″N 51°22′08″E
- Country: Iran
- Province: Kohgiluyeh and Boyer-Ahmad
- County: Dana
- Bakhsh: Kabgian
- Rural District: Kabgian

Population (2006)
  - Total: 68
- Time zone: UTC+3:30 (IRST)
  - Summer (DST): UTC+4:30 (IRDT)

Ab Zalu-ye Vosta-ye Neqareh Khaneh (Persian: اب زالووسطي نقاره خانه, also Romanized as Āb Zālū-ye Vosţā-ye Neqāreh Khāneh; also known as Āb Zālū-ye Mīānī and Āb Zālū-ye Vosţā) is a village in Kabgian Rural District, Kabgian District, Dana County, Kohgiluyeh and Boyer-Ahmad province, Iran. At the 2006 census, its population was 68, in 15 families.
