= Habibabad, Mazandaran =

Habibabad حبيب آباد
- Village
- Location within Iran
- Coordinates: 36°44′30″N 50°58′17″E
- Country: Iran
- Province: Mazandaran
- County: Tonekabon
- Bakhsh: Nashta
- Rural District: Katra

Population (2016)
  - Total: 215
- Time zone: UTC+3:30 (IRST)

Habibabad (Persian: حبيب آباد, also Romanized as Ḩabībābād) is a village in Katra Rural District, Nashta District, Tonekabon County, Mazandaran Province, Iran.

At the time of the 2006 National Census, the village's population was 147 in 42 households. The following census in 2011 counted 268 people in 87 households. The 2016 census measured the population of the village as 215 people in 78 households.
