= Zalu Ab, Ilam =

Zalu Ab زالواب
- Village
- Location within Iran
- Coordinates: 33°01′35″N 46°54′20″E
- Country: Iran
- Province: Ilam
- County: Dehloran
- Bakhsh: Zarrinabad
- Rural District: Seyyed Nasereddin

Population (2006)
  - Total: 14
- Time zone: UTC+3:30 (IRST)
  - Summer (DST): UTC+4:30 (IRDT)

Zalu Ab (Persian: زالواب, also Romanized as Zālū Āb) is a village in Seyyed Nasereddin Rural District, Zarrinabad District, Dehloran County, Ilam Province, Iran. At the 2006 census, its population was 14, in 4 families. The village is populated by Kurds.
