= Cheshmeh-ye Ali, Qalandarabad =

Cheshmeh-ye Ali چشمه علي
- Village
- Location within Iran
- Coordinates: 35°49′16″N 60°12′45″E
- Country: Iran
- Province: Razavi Khorasan
- County: Fariman
- Bakhsh: Qalandarabad
- Rural District: Sefid Sang

Population (2006)
  - Total: 23
- Time zone: UTC+3:30 (IRST)
  - Summer (DST): UTC+4:30 (IRDT)

Cheshmeh-ye Ali (Persian: چشمه علي, also Romanized as Cheshmeh-ye 'Alī and Chashmeh-ye 'Alī; also known as Chashma 'Al) is a village in Sefid Sang Rural District, Qalandarabad District, Fariman County, Razavi Khorasan province, Iran. At the 2006 census, its population was 23, in 5 families.
