= Baba Zeyd, Kermanshah =

Baba Zeyd بابازيد
- Village
- Location within Iran
- Coordinates: 34°14′14″N 47°31′42″E
- Country: Iran
- Province: Kermanshah
- County: Harsin
- Bakhsh: Central
- Rural District: Howmeh

Population (2006)
  - Total: 635
- Time zone: UTC+3:30 (IRST)
  - Summer (DST): UTC+4:30 (IRDT)

Baba Zeyd (Persian: بابازيد, also Romanized as Bābā Zeyd; also known as Bāvāzeyd and Bawāzid) is a village in Howmeh Rural District, in the Central District of Harsin County, Kermanshah Province, Iran. At the 2006 census, its population was 635, in 147 families.
