= Bardneshandeh, Izeh =

Bardneshandeh بردنشانده
- Village
- Location within Iran
- Coordinates: 31°58′33″N 49°38′29″E
- Country: Iran
- Province: Khuzestan
- County: Izeh
- Bakhsh: Central
- Rural District: Margha

Population (2006)
  - Total: 193
- Time zone: UTC+3:30 (IRST)
  - Summer (DST): UTC+4:30 (IRDT)
- Website: http://www.izehpress.com

Bardneshandeh (Persian: بردنشانده, also Romanized as Bardneshāndeh; also known as Bardeh Neshāndeh) is a village in Margha Rural District, in the Central District of Izeh County, Khuzestan Province, Iran. At the 2006 census, its population was 193, in 37 families.
