= Sabzabad, Hamadan =

Sabzabad سبزاباد
- Village
- Location within Iran
- Coordinates: 34°55′12″N 48°45′52″E
- Country: Iran
- Province: Hamadan
- County: Hamadan
- Bakhsh: Central
- Rural District: Sangestan

Population (2006)
  - Total: 89
- Time zone: UTC+3:30 (IRST)
  - Summer (DST): UTC+4:30 (IRDT)

Sabzabad (Persian: سبزاباد, also Romanized as Sabzābād) is a village in Sangestan Rural District, in the Central District of Hamadan County, Hamadan Province, Iran. At the 2006 census, its population was 89, in 23 families.
