= Sabzabad, Shiraz =

Sabzabad سبزاباد
- Village
- Location within Iran
- Coordinates: 29°40′48″N 52°55′00″E
- Country: Iran
- Province: Fars
- County: Shiraz
- Bakhsh: Zarqan
- Rural District: Band-e Amir

Population (2006)
  - Total: 222
- Time zone: UTC+3:30 (IRST)
  - Summer (DST): UTC+4:30 (IRDT)

Sabzabad (Persian: سبزاباد, also Romanized as Sabzābād) is a village in Band-e Amir Rural District, Zarqan District, Shiraz County, Fars province, Iran.

== Demographics ==
At the 2006 census, its population was 222, in 54 families.
