= Habibabad-e Durag =

Habibabad-e Durag حبيب اباددورگ
- Village
- Location within Iran
- Coordinates: 30°22′00″N 51°22′00″E
- Country: Iran
- Province: Fars
- County: Rostam
- Bakhsh: Central
- Rural District: Rostam-e Do

Population (2006)
  - Total: 28
- Time zone: UTC+3:30 (IRST)
  - Summer (DST): UTC+4:30 (IRDT)

Habibabad-e Durag (Persian: حبيب اباددورگ, also Romanized as Ḩabībābād-e Dūrag; also known as Ḩabībābād) is a village in Rostam-e Do Rural District, in the Central District of Rostam County, Fars province, Iran. At the 2006 census, its population was 28, in 6 families.
