= Cheshmeh Ali, Fariman =

Cheshmeh Ali چشمه علي
- Village
- Location within Iran
- Coordinates: 35°38′31″N 59°45′04″E
- Country: Iran
- Province: Razavi Khorasan
- County: Fariman
- Bakhsh: Central
- Rural District: Fariman

Population (2006)
  - Total: 28
- Time zone: UTC+3:30 (IRST)
  - Summer (DST): UTC+4:30 (IRDT)

Cheshmeh Ali (Persian: چشمه علي, also Romanized as Cheshmeh 'Alī and Cheshmeh-ye 'Alī) is a village in Fariman Rural District, in the Central District of Fariman County, Razavi Khorasan province, Iran. At the 2006 census, its population was 28, in 6 families.
