= Ab Zalu-ye Kandeh =

Ab Zalu-ye Kandeh اب زالوكنده
- Village
- Location within Iran
- Coordinates: 30°59′05″N 50°27′23″E
- Country: Iran
- Province: Kohgiluyeh and Boyer-Ahmad
- County: Landeh
- Bakhsh: Central
- Rural District: Tayebi-ye Garmsiri-ye Shomali

Population (2006)
  - Total: 50
- Time zone: UTC+3:30 (IRST)
  - Summer (DST): UTC+4:30 (IRDT)

Ab Zalu-ye Kandeh (Persian: اب زالوكنده, also Romanized as Āb Zālū-ye Kandeh; also known as Āb Zālū) is a village in Tayebi-ye Garmsiri-ye Shomali Rural District, in the Central District of Landeh County, Kohgiluyeh and Boyer-Ahmad province, Iran. At the 2006 census, its population was 50, in 8 families.
