= Shahrak-e Darjetan Ebrahimi =

Shahrak-e Darjetan Ebrahimi شهرك درجتان ابراهيمي
- Village
- Location within Iran
- Coordinates: 27°33′51″N 56°27′54″E
- Country: Iran
- Province: Hormozgan
- County: Bandar Abbas
- Bakhsh: Central
- Rural District: Isin

Population (2006)
  - Total: 113
- Time zone: UTC+3:30 (IRST)
  - Summer (DST): UTC+4:30 (IRDT)

Shahrak-e Darjetan Ebrahimi (Persian: شهرك درجتان ابراهيمي, also Romanized as Shahrak-e Darjetān Ebrāhīmī; also known as Ebrāhīmī and Shahrak-e Darjenān Ebrāhīmī) is a village in Isin Rural District, in the Central District of Bandar Abbas County, Hormozgan Province, Iran. At the 2006 census, its population was 113, in 37 families.
