= Boneh-ye Baba Zahed =

Boneh-ye Baba Zahed بنه بابازاهد
- Village
- Location within Iran
- Coordinates: 32°10′04″N 49°26′17″E
- Country: Iran
- Province: Khuzestan
- County: Andika
- Bakhsh: Central
- Rural District: Qaleh-ye Khvajeh

Population (2006)
  - Total: 79
- Time zone: UTC+3:30 (IRST)
  - Summer (DST): UTC+4:30 (IRDT)

Boneh-ye Baba Zahed (Persian: بنه بابازاهد, also Romanized as Boneh-ye Bābā Zāhed; also known as Bābā Zāhed and Boneh Seyyed) is a village in Qaleh-ye Khvajeh Rural District, in the Central District of Andika County, Khuzestan Province, Iran. At the 2006 census, its population was 79, in 17 families.
