= Anbargah, Kohgiluyeh and Boyer-Ahmad =

Anbargah انبارگاه
- Village
- Location within Iran
- Coordinates: 30°28′20″N 50°31′57″E
- Country: Iran
- Province: Kohgiluyeh and Boyer-Ahmad
- County: Gachsaran
- Bakhsh: Central
- Rural District: Lishtar

Population (2006)
  - Total: 129
- Time zone: UTC+3:30 (IRST)
  - Summer (DST): UTC+4:30 (IRDT)

Anbargah (Persian: انبارگاه, also Romanized as Anbārgāh) is a village in Lishtar Rural District, in the Central District of Gachsaran County, Kohgiluyeh and Boyer-Ahmad Province, Iran. At the 2006 census, its population was 129, in 23 families.
