= Cheshmeh Ali, Chaharmahal and Bakhtiari =

Cheshmeh Ali چشمه علي
- Village
- Location within Iran
- Coordinates: 31°36′45″N 51°14′07″E
- Country: Iran
- Province: Chaharmahal and Bakhtiari
- County: Borujen
- Bakhsh: Gandoman
- Rural District: Dowrahan

Population (2006)
  - Total: 88
- Time zone: UTC+3:30 (IRST)
  - Summer (DST): UTC+4:30 (IRDT)

Cheshmeh Ali (Persian: چشمه علي, also Romanized as Cheshmeh ‘Alī, Chashmeh ‘Alī, and Cheshmeh-ye ‘Alī) is a village in Dowrahan Rural District, Gandoman District, Borujen County, Chaharmahal and Bakhtiari Province, Iran. At the 2006 census, its population was 88, in 32 families. The village is populated by Lurs.
