= Jahangiri-ye Shomali Rural District =

Rural district in Khuzestan province, Iran

Jahangiri-ye Shomali Rural District Persian: دهستان جهانگیری شمالی
- Rural District
- Location within Iran
- Coordinates: 32°01′10″N 49°19′00″E
- Country: Iran
- Province: Khuzestan
- County: Masjed Soleyman
- District: Central
- Capital: Rezaabad

Population (2016)
  - Total: 1,093
- Time zone: UTC+3:30 (IRST)

Jahangiri-ye Shomali Rural District (Persian: دهستان جهانگیری شمالی) is in the Central District of Masjed Soleyman County, Khuzestan province, Iran. Its capital is the village of Rezaabad.

== History ==
Jahangiri-ye Shomali Rural District was established in the Central District after the 2006 National Census.

== Demographics ==
=== Population ===
At the time of the 2011 census, the rural district's population was 1,500 in 342 households. The 2016 census measured the population of the rural district as 1,093 in 317 households. The most populous of its 41 villages was Pagach, with 147 people.
