= Ebrahimi =

Ebrahimi (Persian: ابراهیمی) is an Iranian surname which may refer to:

- Abolfazl Ebrahimi (born 1982), Iranian footballer
- Amir Farshad Ebrahimi, Iranian activist
- Asghar Ebrahimi, Iranian weightlifter
- Hossein Ebrahimi, Iranian footballer
- Mohammad Ebrahimi, Iranian footballer
- Nader Ebrahimi, Iranian writer
- Omid Ebrahimi, Iranian footballer
- Zar Amir Ebrahimi, Iranian actress
