= Ab Zahlu, Izeh =

Ab Zahlu آبزهلو
- Village
- Location within Iran
- Coordinates: 32°08′48″N 49°40′04″E
- Country: Iran
- Province: Khuzestan
- County: Izeh
- Bakhsh: Susan
- Rural District: Susan-e Gharbi

Population (2006)
  - Total: 123
- Time zone: UTC+3:30 (IRST)
  - Summer (DST): UTC+4:30 (IRDT)

Ab Zahlu (Persian: آبزهلو, also Romanized as Āb Zahlū; also known as Āb Zahlī) is a village in Susan-e Gharbi Rural District, Susan District, Izeh County, Khuzestan province, Iran. At the 2006 census, its population was 123, in 17 families.
