= Tombi, Kohgiluyeh and Boyer-Ahmad =

Tembi تمبي
- Village
- Location within Iran
- Coordinates: 30°48′23″N 50°40′58″E
- Country: Iran
- Province: Kohgiluyeh and Boyer-Ahmad
- County: Charam
- Bakhsh: Central
- Rural District: Alqchin

Population (2006)
  - Total: 427
- Time zone: UTC+3:30 (IRST)
  - Summer (DST): UTC+4:30 (IRDT)

Tembi (Persian: تمبي, also Romanized as Tembī) is a village in Alqchin Rural District, in the Central District of Charam County, Kohgiluyeh and Boyer-Ahmad Province, Iran. At the 2006 census, its population was 427, in 85 families.
