= Nargesi, Ilam =

Nargesi نرگسي
- Village
- Location within Iran
- Coordinates: 33°50′30″N 46°15′17″E
- Country: Iran
- Province: Ilam
- County: Eyvan
- Bakhsh: Central
- Rural District: Nabovat

Population (2006)
  - Total: 100
- Time zone: UTC+3:30 (IRST)
  - Summer (DST): UTC+4:30 (IRDT)

Nargesi (Persian: نرگسي, also Romanized as Nargesī) is a village in Nabovat Rural District, in the Central District of Eyvan County, Ilam Province, Iran. At the 2006 census, its population was 100, in 19 families. The village is populated by Kurds.
