= Cheshmeh-ye Ali Akbar =

Cheshmeh-ye Ali Akbar چشمه علي اكبر
- Village
- Location within Iran
- Coordinates: 33°49′05″N 48°07′23″E
- Country: Iran
- Province: Lorestan
- County: Selseleh
- Bakhsh: Firuzabad
- Rural District: Firuzabad

Population (2006)
  - Total: 263
- Time zone: UTC+3:30 (IRST)
  - Summer (DST): UTC+4:30 (IRDT)

Cheshmeh-ye Ali Akbar (Persian: چشمه علي اكبر, also Romanized as Cheshmeh-ye ‘Alī Akbar and Chesmeh-ye ‘Alī Akbar) is a village in Firuzabad Rural District, Firuzabad District, Selseleh County, Lorestan Province, Iran. At the 2006 census, its population was 263, in 50 families.
