= Avazabad, Kerman =

Avazabad عوض اباد
- Village
- Location within Iran
- Coordinates: 27°57′58″N 57°48′24″E
- Country: Iran
- Province: Kerman
- County: Kahnuj
- Bakhsh: Central
- Rural District: Nakhlestan

Population (2006)
  - Total: 658
- Time zone: UTC+3:30 (IRST)
  - Summer (DST): UTC+4:30 (IRDT)

Avazabad (Persian: عوض اباد, also Romanized as ‘Avaẕābād) is a village in Nakhlestan Rural District, in the Central District of Kahnuj County, Kerman Province, Iran. At the 2006 census, its population was 658, in 137 families.
