= Habibabad, Nukabad =

Habibabad حبيب آباد
- Village
- Location within Iran
- Coordinates: 28°37′50″N 60°25′52″E
- Country: Iran
- Province: Sistan and Baluchestan
- County: Khash
- Bakhsh: Nukabad
- Rural District: Gowhar Kuh

Population (2006)
  - Total: 122
- Time zone: UTC+3:30 (IRST)
  - Summer (DST): UTC+4:30 (IRDT)

Habibabad (Persian: حبيب آباد, also Romanized as Ḩabībābād) is a village in Gowhar Kuh Rural District, Nukabad District, Khash County, Sistan and Baluchestan Province, Iran. At the 2006 census, its population was 122, in 32 families.
