= Tembi, Khuzestan =

Tembi تمبي
- Village
- Location within Iran
- Coordinates: 31°37′18″N 49°57′45″E
- Country: Iran
- Province: Khuzestan
- County: Bagh-e Malek
- Bakhsh: Central
- Rural District: Qaleh Tall

Population (2006)
  - Total: 581
- Time zone: UTC+3:30 (IRST)
  - Summer (DST): UTC+4:30 (IRDT)

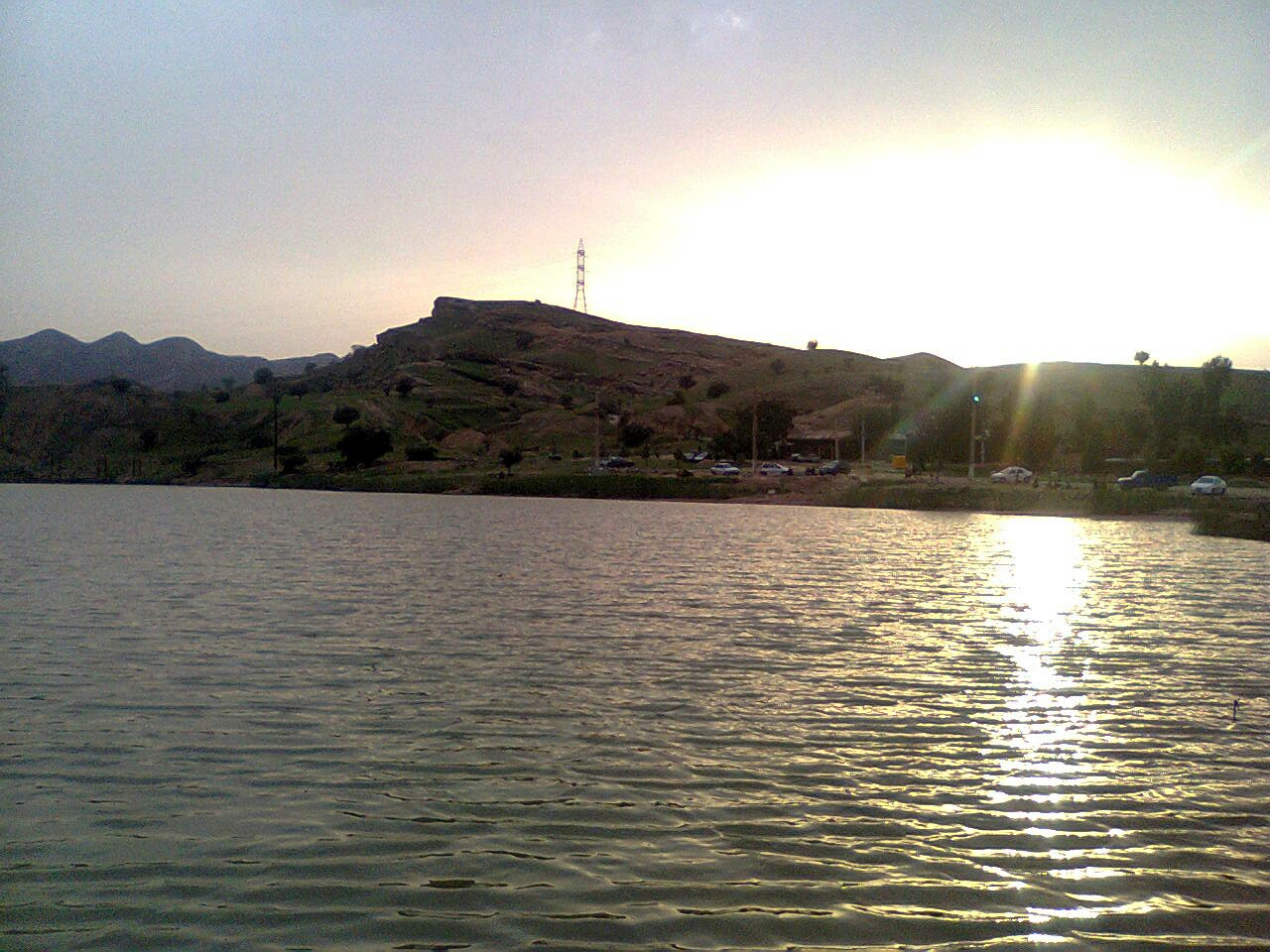
A river in Tembi

Tembi (Persian: تمبي, also Romanized as Tembī; also known as Tenbī) is a village in Qaleh Tall Rural District, in the Central District of Bagh-e Malek County, Khuzestan Province, Iran. At the 2006 census, its population was 581, in 111 families.
