= Habibabad, Fars =

Habibabad حبيب اباد
- Village
- Location within Iran
- Coordinates: 30°04′56″N 51°58′40″E
- Country: Iran
- Province: Fars
- County: Sepidan
- Bakhsh: Hamaijan
- Rural District: Sornabad

Population (2006)
  - Total: 80
- Time zone: UTC+3:30 (IRST)
  - Summer (DST): UTC+4:30 (IRDT)

Habibabad (Persian: حبيب اباد, also Romanized as Ḩabībābād) is a village in Sornabad Rural District, Hamaijan District, Sepidan County, Fars province, Iran. At the 2006 census, its population was 80, in 20 families.
