= Habibabad-e Mazdak =

Habibabad-e Mazdak حبيب ابادمزدك
- Village
- Location within Iran
- Coordinates: 30°44′00″N 51°31′00″E
- Country: Iran
- Province: Kohgiluyeh and Boyer-Ahmad
- County: Boyer-Ahmad
- Bakhsh: Central
- Rural District: Sarrud-e Shomali

Population (2006)
  - Total: 776
- Time zone: UTC+3:30 (IRST)
  - Summer (DST): UTC+4:30 (IRDT)

Habibabad-e Mazdak (Persian: حبيب ابادمزدك, also Romanized as Ḩabībābād-e Mazdak; also known as Dārtāk) is a village in Sarrud-e Shomali Rural District, in the Central District of Boyer-Ahmad County, Kohgiluyeh and Boyer-Ahmad Province, Iran. At the 2006 census, its population was 776, in 165 families.
