= Ab Zalu, Fars =

Ab Zalu ابزالو
- Village
- Location within Iran
- Coordinates: 29°55′42″N 51°47′13″E
- Country: Iran
- Province: Fars
- County: Mamasani
- Bakhsh: Doshman Ziari
- Rural District: Mashayekh

Population (2006)
  - Total: 115
- Time zone: UTC+3:30 (IRST)
  - Summer (DST): UTC+4:30 (IRDT)

Ab Zalu (Persian: ابزالو, also Romanized as Āb Zālū) is a village in Mashayekh Rural District, Doshman Ziari District, Mamasani County, Fars province, Iran. At the 2006 census, its population was 115, in 26 families.
