= Abzalu =

Abzalu اب زالو
- Village
- Location within Iran
- Coordinates: 31°55′51″N 49°36′34″E
- Country: Iran
- Province: Khuzestan
- County: Izeh
- Bakhsh: Central
- Rural District: Margha

Population (2006)
  - Total: 55
- Time zone: UTC+3:30 (IRST)
  - Summer (DST): UTC+4:30 (IRDT)

Abzalu (Persian: اب زالو, also Romanized as Ābzālū) is a village in Margha Rural District, in the Central District of Izeh County, Khuzestan Province, Iran. At the 2006 census, its population was 55, in 7 families.
