= Jahangiri-ye Olya =

Jahangiri-ye Olya جهانگيري عليا
- Village
- Location within Iran
- Coordinates: 30°41′10″N 48°45′17″E
- Country: Iran
- Province: Khuzestan
- County: Shadegan
- Bakhsh: Central
- Rural District: Buzi

Population (2006)
  - Total: 157
- Time zone: UTC+3:30 (IRST)
  - Summer (DST): UTC+4:30 (IRDT)

Jahangiri-ye Olya (Persian: جهانگيري عليا, also Romanized as Jahāngīrī-ye ‘Olyā; also known as Jahāngīrī-ye Bālā) is a village in Buzi Rural District, in the Central District of Shadegan County, Khuzestan Province, Iran. At the 2006 census, its population was 157, in 30 families.
