= Jahangiri, Iran =

Jahangiri جهانگیری
- Village
- Location within Iran
- Coordinates: 32°47′01″N 48°15′35″E
- Country: Iran
- Province: Khuzestan
- County: Andimeshk
- Bakhsh: Alvar-e Garmsiri
- Rural District: Qilab

Population (2006)
  - Total: 605
- Time zone: UTC+3:30 (IRST)
  - Summer (DST): UTC+4:30 (IRDT)

Jahangiri (Persian: جهانگیری, also Romanized as Jahāngīrī) is a village in Qilab Rural District, Alvar-e Garmsiri District, Andimeshk County, Khuzestan Province, Iran. At the 2006 census, its population was 605, in 116 families.
