= Baba Zahed, Andika =

Baba Zahed بابازاهد
- Village
- Location within Iran
- Coordinates: 32°25′16″N 49°39′43″E
- Country: Iran
- Province: Khuzestan
- County: Andika
- Bakhsh: Chelo
- Rural District: Chelo

Population (2006)
  - Total: 154
- Time zone: UTC+3:30 (IRST)
  - Summer (DST): UTC+4:30 (IRDT)

Baba Zahed (Persian: بابازاهد, also Romanized as Bābā Zāhed; also known as Bāba Zaid, Bābā Zāyed, Baba Zeidchaloo, Bābā Zeyār, and Bābā Zeyd) is a village in Chelo Rural District, Chelo District, Andika County, Khuzestan Province, Iran. At the 2006 census, its population was 154, in 24 families.
