= Nargesabad, Fars =

Nargesabad نرگس اباد
- Village
- Location within Iran
- Coordinates: 29°15′24″N 52°03′06″E
- Country: Iran
- Province: Fars
- County: Kazerun
- Bakhsh: Jereh and Baladeh
- Rural District: Jereh

Population (2006)
  - Total: 193
- Time zone: UTC+3:30 (IRST)
  - Summer (DST): UTC+4:30 (IRDT)

Nargesabad (Persian: نرگس اباد, also Romanized as Nargesābād; also known as Nargesī, Narges Zār, and Narjesī) is a village in Jereh Rural District, Jereh and Baladeh District, Kazerun County, Fars province, Iran. At the 2006 census, its population was 193, in 42 families.
