= Anbar District =

District in Khuzestan province, Iran

Anbar District Persian: بخش عنبر
- District
- Location within Iran
- Coordinates: 32°13′03″N 49°07′28″E
- Country: Iran
- Province: Khuzestan
- County: Masjed Soleyman
- Capital: Anbar

Population (2016)
  - Total: 2,045
- Time zone: UTC+3:30 (IRST)

Anbar District (Persian: بخش عنبر) is in Masjed Soleyman County, Khuzestan province, Iran. Its capital is the village of Anbar.

== History ==
After the 2011 National Census, villages were separated from the Central District in the formation of Anbar District, and Anbar was created in the new district.

== Demographics ==
=== Population ===
At the time of the 2016 census, the district's population was 2,045 inhabitants in 644 households.

=== Administrative divisions ===
Anbar District Population
Administrative Divisions	2016
Anbar RD	1,262
Zeylabi RD	783
Total	2,045
RD = Rural District
