= Tolbozan Rural District =

Rural district in Khuzestan province, Iran

Tolbozan Rural District Persian: دهستان تل بزان
- Rural District
- Location within Iran
- Coordinates: 31°54′44″N 49°29′59″E
- Country: Iran
- Province: Khuzestan
- County: Masjed Soleyman
- District: Golgir
- Capital: Qasemabad

Population (2016)
  - Total: 2,485
- Time zone: UTC+3:30 (IRST)

Tolbozan Rural District (Persian: دهستان تل بزان) is in Golgir District of Masjed Soleyman County, Khuzestan province, Iran. Its capital is the village of Qasemabad. The previous capital of the rural district was the village of Rezaabad.

== Demographics ==
=== Population ===
At the time of the 2006 National Census, the rural district's population (as a part of the Central District) was 3,075 in 620 households. There were 1,855 inhabitants in 416 households at the following census of 2011, by which time the rural district had been separated from the district in the formation of Golgir District. The 2016 census measured the population of the rural district as 2,485 in 656 households. The most populous of its 46 villages was Seh Bardan, with 303 people.
