= Tembi Golgir Rural District =

Rural district in Khuzestan province, Iran

Tembi Golgir Rural District Persian: دهستان تمبی گلگير
- Rural District
- Location within Iran
- Coordinates: 31°50′09″N 49°25′58″E
- Country: Iran
- Province: Khuzestan
- County: Masjed Soleyman
- District: Golgir
- Capital: Golgir

Population (2016)
  - Total: 3,664
- Time zone: UTC+3:30 (IRST)

Tembi Golgir Rural District (Persian: دهستان تمبی گلگير) is in Golgir District of Masjed Soleyman County, Khuzestan province, Iran. It is administered from the city of Golgir.

== Demographics ==
=== Population ===
At the time of the 2006 National Census, the rural district's population (as a part of the Central District) was 4,619 in 966 households. There were 3,672 inhabitants in 863 households at the following census of 2011, by which time the rural district had been separated from the district in the establishment of Golgir District. The 2016 census measured the population of the rural district as 3,664 in 1,002 households. The most populous of its 80 villages was Bazar Tombi, with 708 people.
