= Jahangiri Rural District =

Rural district in Khuzestan province, Iran

Jahangiri Rural District Persian: دهستان جهانگیری
- Rural District
- Location within Iran
- Coordinates: 32°02′30″N 49°08′45″E
- Country: Iran
- Province: Khuzestan
- County: Masjed Soleyman
- District: Central
- Capital: Haft Shahidan

Population (2016)
  - Total: 2,469
- Time zone: UTC+3:30 (IRST)

Jahangiri Rural District (Persian: دهستان جهانگیری) is in the Central District of Masjed Soleyman County, Khuzestan province, Iran. Its capital is the village of Haft Shahidan.

== Demographics ==
=== Population ===
At the time of the 2006 National Census, the rural district's population was 3,981 in 797 households. There were 2,122 inhabitants in 471 households at the following census of 2011. The 2016 census measured the population of the rural district as 2,469 in 688 households. The most populous of its 72 villages was Haft Shahidan, with 552 people.
