= Central District (Masjed Soleyman County) =

District in Khuzestan province, Iran

Central District (Masjed Soleyman County) Persian: بخش مرکزی شهرستان مسجد سلیمان
- District
- Location within Iran
- Coordinates: 32°01′10″N 49°13′14″E
- Country: Iran
- Province: Khuzestan
- County: Masjed Soleyman
- Capital: Masjed Soleyman

Population (2016)
  - Total: 104,059
- Time zone: UTC+3:30 (IRST)

The Central District of Masjed Soleyman County (Persian: بخش مرکزی شهرستان مسجد سلیمان) is in Khuzestan province, Iran. Its capital is the city of Masjed Soleyman.

== History ==
After the 2006 National Census, Jahangiri-ye Shomali Rural District was created in the district, and Tembi Golgir and Tolbozan Rural Districts were separated from it in the formation of Golgir District. After the 2011 census, villages were separated from the Central District in the formation of Anbar District.

== Demographics ==
=== Population ===
At the time of the 2006 census, the Central District's population was 117,796 in 24,776 households. The following census in 2011 counted 106,991 people in 25,390 households. The 2016 census measured the population of the district as 104,059 inhabitants in 27,507 households.

=== Administrative divisions ===
Central District (Masjed Soleyman County) Population
| Administrative Divisions | 2006 | 2011 | 2016 |
|---|---|---|---|
| Jahangiri RD | 3,981 | 2,122 | 2,469 |
| Jahangiri-ye Shomali RD | | 1,500 | 1,093 |
| Tembi Golgir RD (Note: Transferred to Golgir District) | 4,619 | | |
| Tolbozan RD | 3,075 | | |
| Masjed Soleyman (city) | 106,121 | 103,369 | 100,497 |
| Total | 117,796 | 106,991 | 104,059 |
RD = Rural District
