= Golgir District =

District in Khuzestan province, Iran

Golgir District Persian: بخش گلگير
- District
- Location within Iran
- Coordinates: 31°51′25″N 49°25′58″E
- Country: Iran
- Province: Khuzestan
- County: Masjed Soleyman
- Capital: Golgir

Population (2016)
  - Total: 7,238
- Time zone: UTC+3:30 (IRST)

Golgir District (Persian: بخش گلگير) is in Masjed Soleyman County, Khuzestan province, Iran. Its capital is the city of Golgir.

== History ==
After the 2006 National Census, Tembi Golgir and Tolbozan Rural Districts were separated from the Central District in the formation of Golgir District. After the 2011 census, the village of Golgir was elevated to the status of a city.

== Demographics ==
=== Population ===
At the time of the 2011 census, the district's population was 5,527 people in 1,279 households. The 2016 census measured the population of the district as 7,238 inhabitants in 1,946 households.

=== Administrative divisions ===
Golgir District Population
Administrative Divisions	2011	2016
Tembi Golgir RD	3,672	3,664
Tolbozan RD	1,855	2,485
Golgir (city)		1,089
Total	5,527	7,238
RD = Rural District
