= Masjed Soleyman County =

County in Khuzestan province, Iran

Masjed Soleyman County Persian: شهرستان مسجد سلیمان
- County
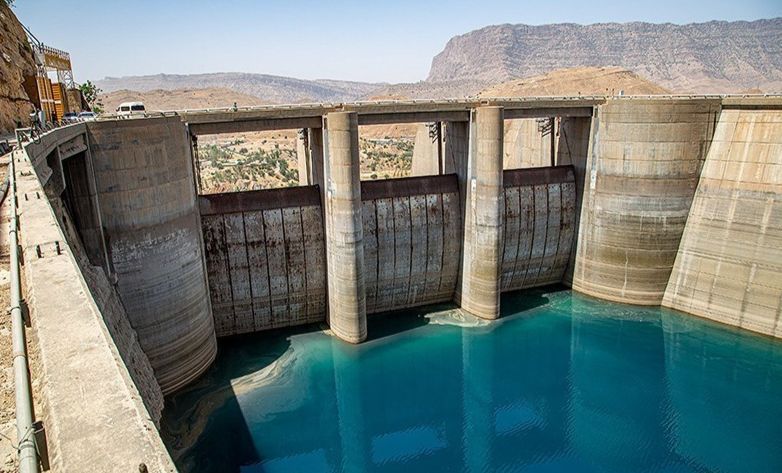
- Shahid Abbaspour Dam

- Location of Masjed Soleyman County in Khuzestan province (center right, pink)

- Location of Khuzestan province in Iran
- Coordinates: 32°01′N 49°21′E
- Country: Iran
- Province: Khuzestan
- Capital: Masjed Soleyman
- Districts: Central, Anbar, Golgir

Population (2016)
  - Total: 113,419
- Time zone: UTC+3:30 (IRST)

Masjed Soleyman County (Persian: شهرستان مسجد سلیمان) is in Khuzestan province, Iran. Its capital is the city of Masjed Soleyman.

== History ==
After the 2006 National Census, Andika District was separated from the county in the establishment of Andika County. At the same time, Jahangiri-ye Shomali Rural District was created in the Central District, and Tembi Golgir and Tolbozan Rural Districts were separated from it in the formation of Golgir District.

After the 2011 census, villages were separated from the Central District to form Anbar District, which was divided into the new Anbar and Zeylabi Rural Districts. The village of Golgir was elevated to the status of a city as well.

== Demographics ==
=== Population ===
At the time of the 2006 census, the county's population was 167,226 in 33,484 households. The following census in 2011 counted 113,257 people in 26,804 households. The 2016 census measured the population of the county as 113,419 in 30,115 households.

=== Administrative divisions ===
Masjed Soleyman County's population history and administrative structure over three consecutive censuses are shown in the following table.

Masjed Soleyman County Population
Administrative Divisions	2006	2011	2016
Central District	117,796	106,991	104,059
Jahangiri RD	3,981	2,122	2,469
Jahangiri-ye Shomali RD		1,500	1,093
Tembi Golgir RD	4,619		
Tolbozan RD	3,075		
Masjed Soleyman (city)	106,121	103,369	100,497
Anbar District			2,045
Anbar RD			1,262
Zeylabi RD			783
Andika District (Note: Transferred to Andika County)	49,430		
Abezhdan RD	13,493		
Chelu RD	5,118		
Kushk RD	8,479		
Lalar and Katak RD	3,991		
Qaleh-ye Khvajeh RD	13,094		
Shalal and Dasht-e Gol RD	4,454		
Qaleh-ye Khvajeh (city)	801		
Golgir District		5,527	7,238
Tembi Golgir RD		3,672	3,664
Tolbozan RD		1,855	2,485
Golgir (city)			1,089
Total	167,226	113,257	113,419
RD = Rural District

== See also ==
Media related to Masjed Soleyman County at Wikimedia Commons
