= Qaleh Sangi =

Qaleh Sangi or Qaleh-ye Sangi (Persian: قلعه سنگي), also rendered as Qaleh Sang, may refer to:

- Qaleh-ye Sangi, Chaharmahal and Bakhtiari
- Qaleh Sangi, East Azerbaijan
- Qaleh Sangi, Fars
- Qaleh Sang, Darab, Fars Province
- Qaleh Sangi, Isfahan
- Qaleh Sangi, Lenjan, Isfahan Province
- Qaleh Sangi, Lorestan
- Qaleh-ye Sangi, Qom
- Qaleh Sangi, Razavi Khorasan
- Qaleh Sangi, Sarakhs, Razavi Khorasan Province
- Qaleh Sangi-ye Rahmatabad, Razavi Khorasan Province
- Qaleh Sangi, Tehran
