= Bokat =

Bokat بكت
- Village
- Location within Iran
- Coordinates: 29°18′39″N 52°52′50″E
- Country: Iran
- Province: Fars
- County: Sarvestan
- Bakhsh: Kuhenjan
- Rural District: Kuhenjan

Population (2006)
  - Total: 664
- Time zone: UTC+3:30 (IRST)
  - Summer (DST): UTC+4:30 (IRDT)

Bokat is a village in the Kuhenjan section of Sarvestan city in Fars province of Iran.

Bokat (Persian: بكت) is a village in Kuhenjan Rural District, Kuhenjan District, Sarvestan County, Fars province, Iran. At the 2006 census, its population was 664, in 164 families.
