= Roknabad =

Roknabad or Rukanabad or Ruknabad or Rowkhnabad (Persian: رکن‌آباد) may refer to:

== Fars Province ==
- Roknabad, Lamerd, a village in Lamerd County
- Roknabad, Pasargad, a village in Pasargad County
- Roknabad, Sarvestan, a village in Sarvestan County
- Roknabad, Shiraz, a stream near Shiraz

== Hormozgan Province ==
- Roknabad, Hormozgan, a village in Hormozgan Province, Iran

== Isfahan Province ==
- Roknabad, Isfahan, a village in Lenjan County

== Kerman Province ==
- Roknabad 1, a village in Bardsir County
- Roknabad 2, a village in Bardsir County
- Roknabad, Rafsanjan, a village in Rafsanjan County

== Lorestan Province ==
- Roknabad, Lorestan, a village in Lorestan Province, Iran

== Razavi Khorasan Province ==
- Roknabad, Razavi Khorasan, a village in Razavi Khorasan Province, Iran

== Semnan Province ==
- Roknabad, Semnan, a village in Semnan Province, Iran

== Sistan and Baluchestan Province ==
- Roknabad, Sistan and Baluchestan, a village in Sistan and Baluchestan Province, Iran

== Yazd Province ==
- Roknabad, Yazd, a village in Meybod County
