= Derakht-e Bid =

Derakht-e Bid (Persian: درخت بيد) may refer to:

- Derakht-e Bid, Fariman
- Derakht-e Bid, Mashhad
- Derakht-e Bid, Torbat-e Jam
- Derakht-e Bid-e Olya
- Derakht-e Bid-e Sofla
