= Nazarabad, Sarvestan =

Village in Fars province, Iran

Nazarabad Persian: نظراباد
- Village
- Location within Iran
- Coordinates: 29°10′00″N 53°16′04″E
- Country: Iran
- Province: Fars
- County: Sarvestan
- District: Central
- Rural District: Shuricheh

Population (2016)
  - Total: 1,356
- Time zone: UTC+3:30 (IRST)

Nazarabad (Persian: نظراباد,) (Note: Also romanized as Naz̧arābād and Nazrābād; also known as Nazarābāe) is a village in Shuricheh Rural District of the Central District of Sarvestan County, Fars province, Iran.

== Demographics ==
=== Population ===
At the time of the 2006 National Census, the village's population was 1,065 in 246 households, when it was in Sarvestan Rural District of the former Sarvestan District of Shiraz County. The following census in 2011 counted 1,175 people in 316 households, by which time the district had been separated from the county in the establishment of Sarvestan County. The rural district was transferred to the new Central District, and Nazarabad was transferred to Shuricheh Rural District created in the district. The 2016 census measured the population of the village as 1,356 people in 409 households. It was the most populous village in its rural district.
