= Mowmenabad =

Mowmenabad (Persian: مؤمن‌آباد) may refer to:

== Fars Province ==
- Mowmenabad, Fars, a village in Sarvestan County

== Kerman Province ==
- Mowmenabad, Bardsir, a village in Bardsir County
- Mowmenabad, Narmashir, a village in Narmashir County

== Lorestan Province ==
- Mowmenabad, Delfan
- Mowmenabad, Selseleh
- Rumeshteh Mowmenabad

== Mazandaran Province ==
- Mowmenabad, Mazandaran, a village in Babol County

== Qom Province ==
- Mowmenabad, Qom

== Razavi Khorasan Province ==
- Momenabad, Chenaran, a village in Chenaran County
- Mowmenabad, Kalat, a village in Kalat County
- Momenabad, Torbat-e Jam, a village in Torbat-e Jam County

== Semnan Province ==
- Mowmenabad, Damghan
- Mowmenabad, Sorkheh

== South Khorasan Province ==
- Ghasem Abad Momen Abad
- Nowzad Momen Abad

== Yazd Province ==
- Mowmenabad, Yazd, a village in Bafq County

== See also ==
- Momenabad
- Mu'minobod, Tajikistan
