= Shurjeh =

Shurjeh (Persian: شورجه) may refer to:

- Shurjeh-ye Emam Jomeh, East Azerbaijan Province
- Shurjeh-ye Turaghay, East Azerbaijan Province
- Shurjeh, Fars
- Shurjeh, Lenjan, Isfahan Province
- Shurjeh, Markazi
- Shurjeh-ye Olya, Markazi Province
- Shurjeh-ye Sofla, Markazi Province
- Shurjeh, Qazvin
- Shurjeh, West Azerbaijan
- Shurjeh Baruq, West Azerbaijan Province
- Shurjeh Kord, West Azerbaijan Province
- Shurjeh, Zanjan
- Shurjeh Rural District, in Fars Province
