= Kalateh-ye Avaz =

Village in Razavi Khorasan province, Iran

Kalateh-ye Avaz Persian: كلاته عوض
- Village
- Location within Iran
- Coordinates: 36°17′34″N 60°24′45″E
- Country: Iran
- Province: Razavi Khorasan
- County: Sarakhs
- District: Marzdaran
- Rural District: Golbibi

Population (2016)
  - Total: 876
- Time zone: UTC+3:30 (IRST)

Kalateh-ye Avaz (Persian: كلاته عوض) (Note: Also romanized as Kalāteh ‘Avaẕ and Kalāteh-ye ‘Avaz; also known as Asadābād and Kalāteh-ye Asad) is a village in Golbibi Rural District of Marzdaran District in Sarakhs County, Razavi Khorasan province, Iran.

== Demographics ==
=== Population ===
At the time of the 2006 National Census, the village's population was 764 in 181 households. The following census in 2011 counted 821 people in 229 households. The 2016 census measured the population of the village as 876 people in 260 households.

This village is located 92 km southwest of Sarakh city, near Bazangan and on the eastern slope of Bazangan mountain range. Its altitude is 1100 meters above sea level and its climate is temperate and dry mountainous.

== Natural and historical attractions ==
- Karkas Cave
- Historic tower
- Gardens and apple orchards
- An aqueduct
- Pistachio forest of Kalateh-ye Avaz
