= Maharlu =

Maharlu (Persian: مهارلو) may refer to:

- Maharlu Kohneh
- Maharlu Now
- Maharlu Rural District
- Maharloo Lake
