= Bid Sukhteh =

Bid Sukhteh or Bidsukhteh or Bid-e Sukhteh (Persian: بيدسوخته) may refer to:

- Bid Sukhteh, Fars
- Bidsukhteh, Kerman
- Bid Sukhteh, Razavi Khorasan
