= Taleb Beygi =

Taleb Beygi طالببيگي
- Village
- Location within Iran
- Coordinates: 29°12′46″N 53°08′02″E
- Country: Iran
- Province: Fars
- County: Sarvestan
- Bakhsh: Central
- Rural District: Shurjeh

Population (2006)
  - Total: 727
- Time zone: UTC+3:30 (IRST)
  - Summer (DST): UTC+4:30 (IRDT)

Taleb Beygi (Persian: طالببيگي, also Romanized as Ţāleb Beygī, Taleb Baigi, and Ţāleb Bīgī, Tāleb-e Beygī, and Ţāleb-e Bīgī; also known as Ţāleb-e Bagi) is a village in Shurjeh Rural District, in the Central District of Sarvestan County, Fars province, Iran. At the 2006 census, its population was 727, in 196 families.
