= Chah Anjir, Sarvestan =

Chah Anjir چاه انجير
- Village
- Location within Iran
- Coordinates: 29°20′08″N 52°56′46″E
- Country: Iran
- Province: Fars
- County: Sarvestan
- Bakhsh: Kuhenjan
- Rural District: Kuhenjan

Population (2006)
  - Total: 479
- Time zone: UTC+3:30 (IRST)
  - Summer (DST): UTC+4:30 (IRDT)

Chah Anjir (Persian: چاه انجير, also Romanized as Chāh Anjīr and Chāh-e Anjīr) is a village in Kuhenjan Rural District, Kuhenjan District, Sarvestan County, Fars province, Iran. At the 2006 census, its population was 479, in 105 families.

This village consists of three parts based on the families origin and location called Eyshoom (nomads camp), Deh-Miani (middle village), and Deh-Donbali (following village). Chah Anjir's inhabitants speak Persian with a distinguishable accent from neighboring villages. Their main businesses are farming and building. Women in Chah Anjir make carpets besides assisting the men in farming activities. Wheat, barley, and pistachio are the major agricultural products in Chah Anjir. Poetry, calligraphy and folk dancing are valued by men and women there.
