= Hezar Darreh =

Hezar Darreh هزاردره
- Village
- Location within Iran
- Coordinates: 29°11′42″N 53°02′13″E
- Country: Iran
- Province: Fars
- County: Sarvestan
- Bakhsh: Central
- Rural District: Shurjeh

Population (2006)
  - Total: 152
- Time zone: UTC+3:30 (IRST)
  - Summer (DST): UTC+4:30 (IRDT)

Hezar Darreh (Persian: هزاردره, also Romanized as Hezār Darreh; also known as Hezār Deh) is a village in Shurjeh Rural District, in the Central District of Sarvestan County, Fars province, Iran. At the 2006 census, its population was 152, in 38 families.
