= Saadatabad, Sarvestan =

Saadatabad سعادتاباد
- Village
- Location within Iran
- Coordinates: 29°16′22″N 53°03′40″E
- Country: Iran
- Province: Fars
- County: Sarvestan
- Bakhsh: Kuhenjan
- Rural District: Kuhenjan

Population (2006)
  - Total: 242
- Time zone: UTC+3:30 (IRST)
  - Summer (DST): UTC+4:30 (IRDT)

Saadatabad (Persian: سعادتاباد, also Romanized as Sa‘ādatābād; also known as Sa‘adat Abad Sarvestan) is a village in Kuhenjan Rural District, Kuhenjan District, Sarvestan County, Fars province, Iran. At the 2006 census, its population was 242, in 64 families.
