= Kharzahreh =

Kharzahreh خرزهره
- Village
- Location within Iran
- Coordinates: 29°17′46″N 52°53′36″E
- Country: Iran
- Province: Fars
- County: Sarvestan
- Bakhsh: Kuhenjan
- Rural District: Kuhenjan

Population (2006)
  - Total: 132
- Time zone: UTC+3:30 (IRST)
  - Summer (DST): UTC+4:30 (IRDT)

Kharzahreh (Persian: خرزهره; also known as Eslāmābād) is a village in Kuhenjan Rural District, Kuhenjan District, Sarvestan County, Fars province, Iran. At the 2006 census, its population was 132, in 30 families.
