= Sarv Nokhvodi =

Sarv Nokhvodi سرونخودي
- Village
- Location within Iran
- Coordinates: 29°05′43″N 53°12′09″E
- Country: Iran
- Province: Fars
- County: Sarvestan
- Bakhsh: Central
- Rural District: Sarvestan

Population (2006)
  - Total: 52
- Time zone: UTC+3:30 (IRST)
  - Summer (DST): UTC+4:30 (IRDT)

Sarv Nokhvodi (Persian: سرونخودي, also Romanized as Sarv Nokhvodī; also known as Sarv va Nokhvodī) is a village in Sarvestan Rural District, in the Central District of Sarvestan County, Fars province, Iran. At the 2006 census, its population was 52, in 9 families.
