= Galleh Dari Tal Puk =

Galleh Dari Tal Puk گله داری تل پوک
- Village
- Country: Iran
- Province: Fars
- County: Sarvestan
- Bakhsh: Central
- Rural District: Sarvestan

Population (2006)
  - Total: 193
- Time zone: UTC+3:30 (IRST)
  - Summer (DST): UTC+4:30 (IRDT)

Galleh Dari Tal Puk (Persian: گله داری تل پوک, also Romanized as Galleh Dārī Tal Pūk) is a village in Sarvestan Rural District, in the Central District of Sarvestan County, Fars province, Iran. At the 2006 census, its population was 193, in 47 families.
