= Ala ol Dowleh =

Ala ol Dowleh اعلاالدوله
- Village
- Location within Iran
- Coordinates: 29°23′34″N 52°53′50″E
- Country: Iran
- Province: Fars
- County: Sarvestan
- Bakhsh: Kuhenjan
- Rural District: Kuhenjan

Population (2006)
  - Total: 225
- Time zone: UTC+3:30 (IRST)
  - Summer (DST): UTC+4:30 (IRDT)

Ala ol Dowleh (Persian: اعلاالدوله, also Romanized as Ā‘lā ol Dowleh; also known as 'Ala' Dowlat, A‘lá Dowlat, 'Alā Dowleh, 'Alā od Doleh, and A’law Dowlat) is a village in Kuhenjan Rural District, Kuhenjan District, Sarvestan County, Fars province, Iran. At the 2006 census, its population was 225, in 48 families.
