= Amirabad-e Panjahoshesh =

Amirabad-e Panjahoshesh اميرآباد56
- Village
- Location within Iran
- Coordinates: 29°16′59″N 53°08′30″E
- Country: Iran
- Province: Fars
- County: Sarvestan
- Bakhsh: Central
- Rural District: Sarvestan

Population (2006)
  - Total: 40
- Time zone: UTC+3:30 (IRST)
  - Summer (DST): UTC+4:30 (IRDT)

Amirabad-e Panjahoshesh (Persian: اميرآباد56, also Romanized as Amīrābād-e Panjaoshesh) is a village in Sarvestan Rural District, in the Central District of Sarvestan County, Fars province, Iran. At the 2006 census, its population was 40, in 11 families.
