= Posht Par =

Posht Par or Poshtpar or Posht-e Par (Persian: پشت پر) may refer to:

- Posht Par, Mamasani, Fars Province
- Posht-e Par, Sarvestan, Fars Province
- Posht Par, Khuzestan
- Posht Par Rural District
