= Dowbaneh, Fars =

Dowbaneh دوبنه
- Village
- Location within Iran
- Coordinates: 29°25′05″N 52°46′54″E
- Country: Iran
- Province: Fars
- County: Sarvestan
- Bakhsh: Kuhenjan
- Rural District: Maharlu

Population (2006)
  - Total: 120
- Time zone: UTC+3:30 (IRST)
  - Summer (DST): UTC+4:30 (IRDT)

Dowbaneh (Persian: دوبنه, also Romanized as Do Baneh; also known as Donbeh, Downbeh, and Dunheh) is a village in Maharlu Rural District, Kuhenjan District, Sarvestan County, Fars province, Iran. At the 2006 census, its population was 120, in 28 families.
