= Dowlatabad, Kuhenjan =

Dowlatabad دولت آباد
- Village
- Location within Iran
- Coordinates: 29°11′59″N 53°00′22″E
- Country: Iran
- Province: Fars
- County: Sarvestan
- Bakhsh: Kuhenjan
- Rural District: Kuhenjan

Population (2006)
  - Total: 22
- Time zone: UTC+3:30 (IRST)
  - Summer (DST): UTC+4:30 (IRDT)

Dowlatabad (Persian: دولت آباد, also Romanized as Dowlatābād) is a village in Kuhenjan Rural District, Kuhenjan District, Sarvestan County, Fars province, Iran. At the 2006 census, its population was 22, in 6 families.
