= Qanbari, Fars =

Qanbari قنبري
- Village
- Location within Iran
- Coordinates: 29°19′23″N 52°58′43″E
- Country: Iran
- Province: Fars
- County: Sarvestan
- Bakhsh: Kuhenjan
- Rural District: Kuhenjan

Population (2006)
  - Total: 241
- Time zone: UTC+3:30 (IRST)
  - Summer (DST): UTC+4:30 (IRDT)

Qanbari (Persian: قنبري, also Romanized as Qanbarī; also known as Ghanbari) is a village in Kuhenjan Rural District, Kuhenjan District, Sarvestan County, Fars province, Iran. At the 2006 census, its population was 241, in 55 families.
