= Amirabad-e Panjahopanj =

Amirabad-e Panjahopanj اميرآباد55
- Village
- Location within Iran
- Coordinates: 29°17′00″N 53°09′33″E
- Country: Iran
- Province: Fars
- County: Sarvestan
- Bakhsh: Central
- Rural District: Sarvestan

Population (2006)
  - Total: 86
- Time zone: UTC+3:30 (IRST)
  - Summer (DST): UTC+4:30 (IRDT)

Amirabad-e Panjahopanj (Persian: اميرآباد55, also Romanized as Amīrābād-e Panjahopanj) is a village in Sarvestan Rural District, in the Central District of Sarvestan County, Fars province, Iran. At the 2006 census, its population was 86, in 19 families.
