= Chah Sorkh, Sarvestan =

Chah Sorkh چاه سرخ
- Village
- Country: Iran
- Province: Fars
- County: Sarvestan
- Bakhsh: Central
- Rural District: Sarvestan

Population (2006)
  - Total: 42
- Time zone: UTC+3:30 (IRST)
  - Summer (DST): UTC+4:30 (IRDT)

Chah Sorkh (Persian: چاه سرخ, also Romanized as Chāh Sorkh) is a village in Sarvestan Rural District, in the Central District of Sarvestan County, Fars province, Iran. At the 2006 census, its population was 42, in 7 families.
