= Kamalabad, Sarvestan =

Kamalabad كمال اباد
- Village
- Location within Iran
- Coordinates: 29°18′10″N 53°00′45″E
- Country: Iran
- Province: Fars
- County: Sarvestan
- Bakhsh: Kuhenjan
- Rural District: Kuhenjan

Population (2006)
  - Total: 453
- Time zone: UTC+3:30 (IRST)
  - Summer (DST): UTC+4:30 (IRDT)

Kamalabad (Persian: كمال اباد, also Romanized as Kamālābād) is a village in Kuhenjan Rural District, Kuhenjan District, Sarvestan County, Fars province, Iran. At the 2006 census, its population was 453, in 112 families.
