= Shurijeh =

Shurijeh (Persian: شوريجه) may refer to:

- Shurijeh, Fars
- Shurijeh, West Azerbaijan
- Shuricheh (disambiguation)
