= Dowlatabad, Sarvestan =

Dowlatabad دولت آباد
- Village
- Location within Iran
- Coordinates: 29°15′48″N 53°09′49″E
- Country: Iran
- Province: Fars
- County: Sarvestan
- Bakhsh: Central
- Rural District: Sarvestan

Population (2006)
  - Total: 530
- Time zone: UTC+3:30 (IRST)
  - Summer (DST): UTC+4:30 (IRDT)

Dowlatabad (Persian: دولت آباد, also Romanized as Dowlatābād; also known as Daulatābād) is a village in Sarvestan Rural District, in the Central District of Sarvestan County, Fars province, Iran. At the 2006 census, its population was 530, in 107 families.
