= Kateh Gonbad =

Village in Fars province, Iran

Kateh Gonbad Persian: كته گنبد
- Village
- Location within Iran
- Coordinates: 29°16′11″N 53°08′35″E
- Country: Iran
- Province: Fars
- County: Sarvestan
- District: Central
- Rural District: Sarvestan

Population (2016)
  - Total: 1,086
- Time zone: UTC+3:30 (IRST)

Kateh Gonbad (Persian: كته گنبد) is a village in, and the capital of, Sarvestan Rural District of the Central District of Sarvestan County, Fars province, Iran.

== Demographics ==
=== Population ===
At the time of the 2006 National Census, the village's population was 989 in 239 households, when it was in the former Sarvestan District of Shiraz County. The following census in 2011 counted 1,020 people in 285 households, by which time the district had been separated from the county in the establishment of Sarvestan County. The rural district was transferred to the new Central District. The 2016 census measured the population of the village as 1,086 people in 324 households. It was the most populous village in its rural district.
