= Qasr-e Sasan =

Qasr-e Sasan قصرساسان
- Village
- Location within Iran
- Coordinates: 29°11′53″N 53°13′54″E
- Country: Iran
- Province: Fars
- County: Sarvestan
- Bakhsh: Central
- Rural District: Sarvestan

Population (2006)
  - Total: 20
- Time zone: UTC+3:30 (IRST)
  - Summer (DST): UTC+4:30 (IRDT)

Qasr-e Sasan (Persian: قصرساسان, also Romanized as Qaşr-e Sāsān) is a village in Sarvestan Rural District, in the Central District of Sarvestan County, Fars province, Iran. At the 2006 census, its population was 20, in 5 families.
