= Seyfabad, Sarvestan =

Village in Fars province, Iran

Seyfabad Persian: سيف اباد
- Village
- Location within Iran
- Coordinates: 29°17′17″N 52°54′50″E
- Country: Iran
- Province: Fars
- County: Sarvestan
- District: Kuhenjan
- Rural District: Kuhenjan

Population (2016)
  - Total: 1,207
- Time zone: UTC+3:30 (IRST)

Seyfabad (Persian: سيف اباد) (Note: Also romanized as Saifābād and Seyfābād) is a village in Kuhenjan Rural District of Kuhenjan District, Sarvestan County, Fars province, Iran.

== Demographics ==
=== Population ===
At the time of the 2006 National Census, the village's population was 1,122 in 273 households, when it was in the former Sarvestan District of Shiraz County. The following census in 2011 counted 1,285 people in 310 households, by which time the district had been separated from the county in the establishment of Sarvestan County. The rural district was transferred to the new Kuhenjan District. The 2016 census measured the population of the village as 1,207 people in 330 households. It was the most populous village in its rural district.
