= Beytollahi =

Beytollahi بيتالهي
- Village
- Location within Iran
- Coordinates: 29°16′33″N 52°55′02″E
- Country: Iran
- Province: Fars
- County: Sarvestan
- Bakhsh: Kuhenjan
- Rural District: Kuhenjan

Population (2006)
  - Total: 21
- Time zone: UTC+3:30 (IRST)
  - Summer (DST): UTC+4:30 (IRDT)

Beytollahi (Persian: بيتالهي, also Romanized as Beytollāhī) is a village in Kuhenjan Rural District, Kuhenjan District, Sarvestan County, Fars province, Iran. At the 2006 census, its population was 21, in 5 families.
