= Kuhenjan =

Kuhenjan or Koohanjan or Koohenjan or Kuhanjan (Persian: كوهنجان) may refer to:

- Kuhenjan, Sarvestan, a city in Sarvestan County, Fars province
- Kuhenjan District, in Sarvestan County, Fars province
- Kuhenjan Rural District, in Sarvestan County, Fars province
