= Shur Ab-e Olya, Sarakhs =

Village in Razavi Khorasan province, Iran

Shur Ab-e Olya Persian: شوراب عليا
- Village
- Location within Iran
- Country: Iran
- Province: Razavi Khorasan
- County: Sarakhs
- District: Marzdaran
- Rural District: Pol Khatun

Population (2016)
  - Total: 251
- Time zone: UTC+3:30 (IRST)

Shur Ab-e Olya (Persian: شوراب عليا) (Note: Also romanized as Shūr Āb-e ‘Olyā) is a village in Pol Khatun Rural District of Marzdaran District in Sarakhs County, Razavi Khorasan province, Iran.

== Demographics ==
=== Population ===
At the time of the 2006 National Census, the village's population was 325 in 55 households. The following census in 2011 counted 255 people in 53 households. The 2016 census measured the population of the village as 251 people in 72 households.
