= Khodadad, Razavi Khorasan =

Village in Razavi Khorasan province, Iran

Khodadad Persian: خداداد
- Village
- Location within Iran
- Coordinates: 36°07′18″N 60°54′55″E
- Country: Iran
- Province: Razavi Khorasan
- County: Sarakhs
- District: Marzdaran
- Rural District: Pol Khatun

Population (2016)
  - Total: 171
- Time zone: UTC+3:30 (IRST)

Khodadad (Persian: خداداد) (Note: Also romanized as Khodādād; also known as Kalāteh-ye Khodādād) is a village in Pol Khatun Rural District of Marzdaran District in Sarakhs County, Razavi Khorasan province, Iran.

== Demographics ==
=== Population ===
At the time of the 2006 National Census, the village's population was 158 in 31 households. The following census in 2011 counted 139 people in 36 households. The 2016 census measured the population of the village as 171 people in 43 households.
