= Yurdhai-ye Miraki =

Yurdhai-ye Miraki يوردهاي ميركي
- Village
- Country: Iran
- Province: Fars
- County: Sarvestan
- Bakhsh: Central
- Rural District: Sarvestan

Population (2006)
  - Total: 21
- Time zone: UTC+3:30 (IRST)
  - Summer (DST): UTC+4:30 (IRDT)

Yurdhai-ye Miraki (Persian: يوردهاي ميركي, also Romanized as Yūrdhāī-ye Mīrakī) is a village in Sarvestan Rural District, in the Central District of Sarvestan County, Fars province, Iran. At the 2006 census, its population was 21, in 6 families.
