= Qerqereh =

Village in Razavi Khorasan province, Iran

Qerqereh Persian: قرقره
- Village
- Location within Iran
- Coordinates: 36°13′49″N 60°28′30″E
- Country: Iran
- Province: Razavi Khorasan
- County: Sarakhs
- District: Marzdaran
- Rural District: Golbibi

Population (2016)
  - Total: 156
- Time zone: UTC+3:30 (IRST)

Qerqereh (Persian: قرقره) (Note: Also romanized as Qorqoreh; also known as Ghorghoreh) is a village in Golbibi Rural District of Marzdaran District in Sarakhs County, Razavi Khorasan province, Iran.

== Demographics ==
=== Population ===
At the time of the 2006 National Census, the village's population was 145 in 37 households. The following census in 2011 counted 120 people in 33 households. The 2016 census measured the population of the village as 156 people in 42 households.
