= Sadrabad, Sarakhs =

Village in Razavi Khorasan province, Iran

Sadrabad Persian: صدراباد
- Village
- Location within Iran
- Coordinates: 35°58′39″N 61°06′37″E
- Country: Iran
- Province: Razavi Khorasan
- County: Sarakhs
- District: Marzdaran
- Rural District: Pol Khatun

Population (2016)
  - Total: 626
- Time zone: UTC+3:30 (IRST)

Sadrabad (Persian: صدراباد) (Note: Also romanized as Şadrābād) is a village in Pol Khatun Rural District of Marzdaran District in Sarakhs County, Razavi Khorasan province, Iran.

== Demographics ==
=== Population ===
At the time of the 2006 National Census, the village's population was 477 in 90 households. The following census in 2011 counted 372 people in 92 households. The 2016 census measured the population of the village as 626 people in 182 households.
