= Shur Ab-e Sofla, Sarakhs =

Village in Razavi Khorasan province, Iran

Shur Ab-e Sofla Persian: شوراب سفلي
- Village
- Location within Iran
- Coordinates: 35°56′57″N 61°04′59″E
- Country: Iran
- Province: Razavi Khorasan
- County: Sarakhs
- District: Marzdaran
- Rural District: Pol Khatun

Population (2016)
  - Total: 170
- Time zone: UTC+3:30 (IRST)

Shur Ab-e Sofla (Persian: شوراب سفلي) (Note: Also romanized as Shūr Āb-e Soflá; also known as Shūrāb (شوراب) and Shūrāb-e Pā’īn) is a village in Pol Khatun Rural District of Marzdaran District in Sarakhs County, Razavi Khorasan province, Iran.

== Demographics ==
=== Population ===
At the time of the 2006 National Census, the village's population was 228 in 42 households. The following census in 2011 counted 163 people in 37 households. The 2016 census measured the population of the village as 170 people in 45 households.
