= Jahangir-e Olya =

Village in Razavi Khorasan province, Iran

Jahangir-e Olya Persian: جهانگيرعليا
- Village
- Location within Iran
- Coordinates: 36°23′31″N 60°17′37″E
- Country: Iran
- Province: Razavi Khorasan
- County: Sarakhs
- District: Marzdaran
- Rural District: Golbibi

Population (2016)
  - Total: 82
- Time zone: UTC+3:30 (IRST)

Jahangir-e Olya (Persian: جهانگيرعليا) (Note: Also romanized as Jahāngīr-e ‘Olyā; also known as Jahāngīr) is a village in Golbibi Rural District of Marzdaran District in Sarakhs County, Razavi Khorasan province, Iran.

== Demographics ==
=== Population ===
At the time of the 2006 National Census, the village's population was 62 in 16 households. The following census in 2011 counted 61 people in 15 households. The 2016 census measured the population of the village as 82 people in 26 households.
