= Yurdhai =

Yurdhai (Persian: يوردهاي) may refer to:

- Yurdhai-ye Abdol Yusefi
- Yurdhai-ye Miraki
