= Aq Darband =

Aq Darband may refer to:

- Aqdarband Coal Mine
- Darband-e Olya, Sarakhs
- Darband-e Sofla, Sarakhs
