= Padali, Iran =

Village in Razavi Khorasan province, Iran

Padali Persian: پدلي
- Village
- Location within Iran
- Coordinates: 36°03′58″N 60°53′20″E
- Country: Iran
- Province: Razavi Khorasan
- County: Sarakhs
- District: Marzdaran
- Rural District: Pol Khatun

Population (2016)
  - Total: 188
- Time zone: UTC+3:30 (IRST)

Padali (Persian: پدلي) (Note: Also romanized as Padalī) is a village in Pol Khatun Rural District of Marzdaran District in Sarakhs County, Razavi Khorasan province, Iran.

== Demographics ==
=== Population ===
At the time of the 2006 National Census, the village's population was 247 in 53 households. The following census in 2011 counted 126 people in 34 households. The 2016 census measured the population of the village as 188 people in 54 households.
