= Deraz Ab, Razavi Khorasan =

Village in Razavi Khorasan province, Iran

Deraz Ab Persian: درازاب
- Village
- Location within Iran
- Coordinates: 36°04′45″N 60°50′25″E
- Country: Iran
- Province: Razavi Khorasan
- County: Sarakhs
- District: Marzdaran
- Rural District: Pol Khatun

Population (2016)
  - Total: 241
- Time zone: UTC+3:30 (IRST)

Deraz Ab (Persian: درازاب) (Note: Also romanized as Darāz Āb and Derāz Ab; also known as Āb Derāz, Darzāb, and Şaḩrā-ye Derāz Āb) is a village in Pol Khatun Rural District of Marzdaran District in Sarakhs County, Razavi Khorasan province, Iran.

== Demographics ==
=== Population ===
At the time of the 2006 National Census, the village's population was 225 in 44 households. The following census in 2011 counted 188 people in 49 households. The 2016 census measured the population of the village as 241 people in 61 households.
