= Shurjeh, Fars =

Village in Fars province, Iran

Shurjeh Persian: شوریجه
- Village
- Location within Iran
- Coordinates: 29°11′17″N 53°04′34″E
- Country: Iran
- Province: Fars
- County: Sarvestan
- District: Central
- Rural District: Shuricheh

Population (2016)
  - Total: 921
- Time zone: UTC+3:30 (IRST)

Shurjeh (Persian: شورجه) (Note: Also romanized as Shūrjeh; also known as Shūra Jubbeh, Shūrājān, Shūrcheh, and Shūrījeh) is a village in, and the capital of, Shuricheh Rural District of the Central District of Sarvestan County, Fars province, Iran.

== Demographics ==
=== Population ===
At the time of the 2006 National Census, the village's population was 993 in 227 households, when it was in Sarvestan Rural District of the former Sarvestan District of Shiraz County. The following census in 2011 counted 1,033 people in 320 households, by which time the district had been separated from the county in the establishment of Sarvestan County. The rural district was transferred to the new Central District, and Shurjeh was transferred to Shuricheh Rural District created in the district. The 2016 census measured the population of the village as 921 people in 269 households.
