= Shakrallah =

Village in Razavi Khorasan province, Iran

Shakrallah Persian: شكرالله
- Village
- Location within Iran
- Coordinates: 36°04′52″N 60°53′29″E
- Country: Iran
- Province: Razavi Khorasan
- County: Sarakhs
- District: Marzdaran
- Rural District: Pol Khatun

Population (2016)
  - Total: 132
- Time zone: UTC+3:30 (IRST)

Shakrallah (Persian: شكرالله) (Note: Also romanized as Shaḵrāllah) is a village in Pol Khatun Rural District of Marzdaran District in Sarakhs County, Razavi Khorasan province, Iran.

== Demographics ==
=== Population ===
At the time of the 2006 National Census, the village's population was 137 in 23 households. The following census in 2011 counted 104 people in 29 households. The 2016 census measured the population of the village as 132 people in 37 households.
