= Bagh Baghu =

Village in Razavi Khorasan province, Iran

Bagh Baghu Persian: بغ بغو
- Village
- Location within Iran
- Country: Iran
- Province: Razavi Khorasan
- County: Sarakhs
- District: Marzdaran
- Rural District: Marzdaran

Population (2016)
  - Total: 238
- Time zone: UTC+3:30 (IRST)

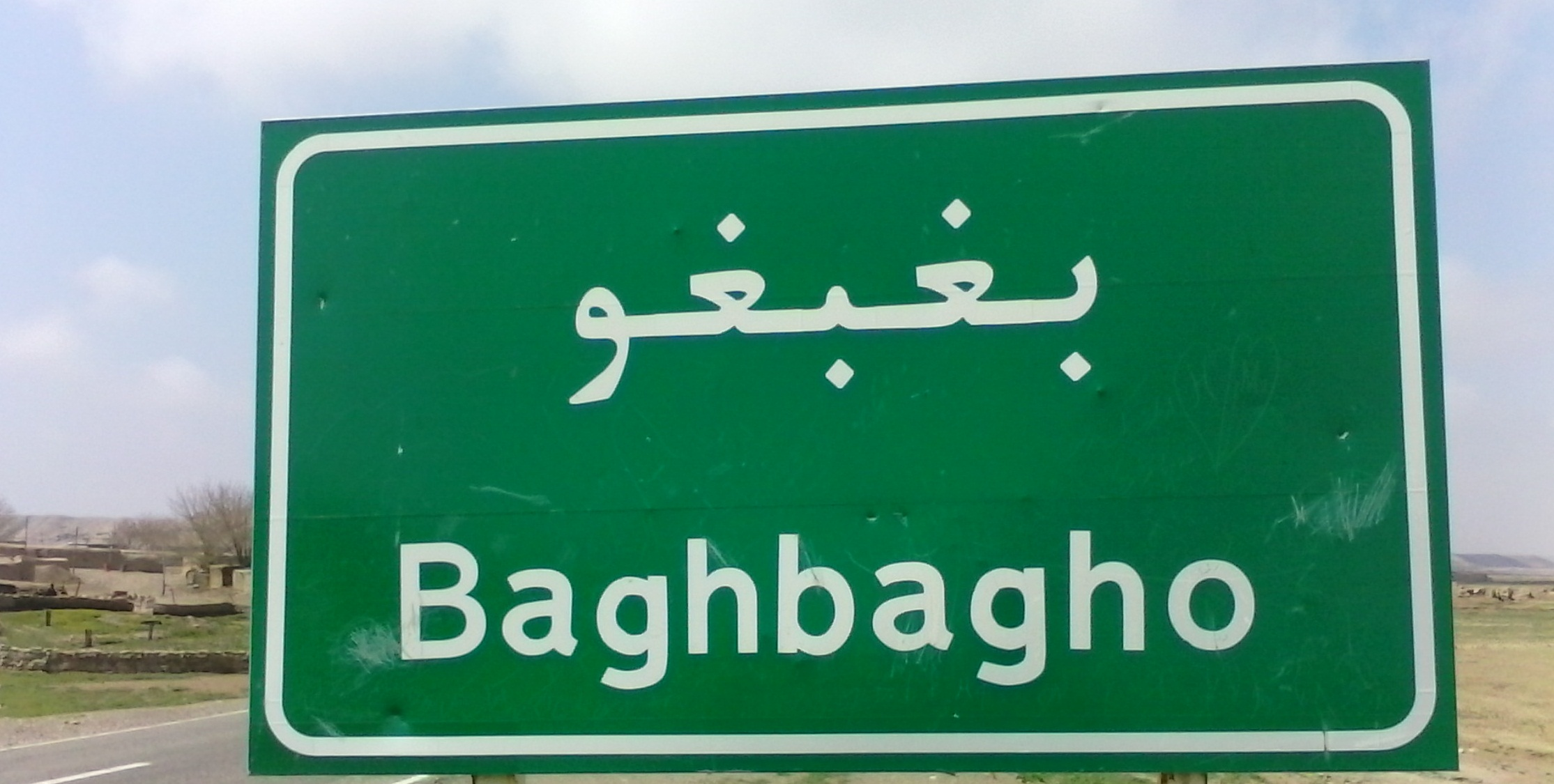

Bagh Baghu (Persian: بغ بغو) (Note: Also romanized as Bagh Baghū and Baghbaghū; also known as Bāgh Baqu and Baqbaqū) is a village in Marzdaran Rural District of Marzdaran District in Sarakhs County, Razavi Khorasan province, Iran.

== Demographics ==
=== Population ===
At the time of the 2006 National Census, the village's population was 314 in 68 households. The following census in 2011 counted 258 people in 69 households. The 2016 census measured the population of the village as 238 people in 64 households.
