= Chakudar =

Village in Razavi Khorasan province, Iran

Chakudar Persian: چكودر
- Village
- Location within Iran
- Coordinates: 36°14′20″N 60°39′11″E
- Country: Iran
- Province: Razavi Khorasan
- County: Sarakhs
- District: Marzdaran
- Rural District: Marzdaran

Population (2016)
  - Total: 863
- Time zone: UTC+3:30 (IRST)

Chakudar (Persian: چكودر) (Note: Also romanized as Chakūdar) is a village in Marzdaran Rural District of Marzdaran District in Sarakhs County, Razavi Khorasan province, Iran.

== Demographics ==
=== Population ===
At the time of the 2006 National Census, the village's population was 722 in 181 households. The following census in 2011 counted 756 people in 198 households. The 2016 census measured the population of the village as 863 people in 243 households, the most populous in its rural district.
