= Shalghami =

Shalghami (Persian: شلغمي) may refer to any of three villages in Pol Khatun Rural District, Marzdaran District, Sarakhs County, Razavi Khorasan Province, Iran:

- Shalghami-ye Olya
- Shalghami-ye Sofla
