= Ertinj =

Village in Razavi Khorasan province, Iran

Ertinj Persian: ارتينج
- Village
- Location within Iran
- Coordinates: 36°20′02″N 60°22′34″E
- Country: Iran
- Province: Razavi Khorasan
- County: Sarakhs
- District: Marzdaran
- Rural District: Golbibi

Population (2016)
  - Total: 58
- Time zone: UTC+3:30 (IRST)

Ertinj (Persian: ارتينج) (Note: Also romanized as Ertīnj; also known as Ertnīj) is a village in Golbibi Rural District of Marzdaran District in Sarakhs County, Razavi Khorasan province, Iran.

== Demographics ==
=== Population ===
At the time of the 2006 National Census, the village's population was 18 in six households. The following census in 2011 counted a population below the reporting threshold. The 2016 census measured the population of the village as 58 people in 20 households.
