= Abderaz =

Village in Razavi Khorasan province, Iran

Abderaz Persian: ابدراز
- Village
- Location within Iran
- Coordinates: 36°16′26″N 60°26′55″E
- Country: Iran
- Province: Razavi Khorasan
- County: Sarakhs
- District: Marzdaran
- Rural District: Golbibi

Population (2016)
  - Total: 496
- Time zone: UTC+3:30 (IRST)

Abderaz (Persian: ابدراز) (Note: Also romanized as Āb Darāz and Ābderāz) is a village in Golbibi Rural District of Marzdaran District in Sarakhs County, Razavi Khorasan province, Iran.

== Demographics ==
=== Population ===
At the time of the 2006 National Census, the village's population was 552 in 132 households. The following census in 2011 counted 486 people in 135 households. The 2016 census measured the population of the village as 496 people in 145 households.
