= Shur Ab-e Vosta =

Village in Razavi Khorasan province, Iran

Shur Ab-e Vosta Persian: شوراب وسطي
- Village
- Location within Iran
- Coordinates: 35°56′14″N 61°03′40″E
- Country: Iran
- Province: Razavi Khorasan
- County: Sarakhs
- District: Marzdaran
- Rural District: Pol Khatun

Population (2016)
  - Total: 22
- Time zone: UTC+3:30 (IRST)

Shur Ab-e Vosta (Persian: شوراب وسطي) (Note: Also romanized as Shūr Āb-e Vosţá; also known as Shūr Āb-e Vasaţ) is a village in Pol Khatun Rural District of Marzdaran District in Sarakhs County, Razavi Khorasan province, Iran.

== Demographics ==
=== Population ===
At the time of the 2006 National Census, the village's population was 57 in 14 households. The following census in 2011 counted 17 people in four households. The 2016 census measured the population of the village as 22 people in seven households.
