= Kalateh-ye Keyani =

Village in Razavi Khorasan province, Iran

Kalateh-ye Keyani Persian: كلاته كياني
- Village
- Location within Iran
- Coordinates: 36°01′24″N 60°57′36″E
- Country: Iran
- Province: Razavi Khorasan
- County: Sarakhs
- District: Marzdaran
- Rural District: Pol Khatun

Population (2016)
  - Total: 130
- Time zone: UTC+3:30 (IRST)

Kalateh-ye Keyani (Persian: كلاته كياني) (Note: Also romanized as Kalāteh-ye Keyānī) is a village in Pol Khatun Rural District of Marzdaran District in Sarakhs County, Razavi Khorasan province, Iran.

== Demographics ==
=== Population ===
At the time of the 2006 National Census, the village's population was 123 in 25 households. The following census in 2011 counted 60 people in 17 households. The 2016 census measured the population of the village as 130 people in 41 households.
