= Yurdhai-ye Abdol Yusefi =

Yurdhai-ye Abdol Yusefi يوردهای عبدل يوسفی
- Village
- Country: Iran
- Province: Fars
- County: Sarvestan
- Bakhsh: Central
- Rural District: Sarvestan

Population (2006)
  - Total: 168
- Time zone: UTC+3:30 (IRST)
  - Summer (DST): UTC+4:30 (IRDT)

Yurdhai-ye Abdol Yusefi (Persian: يوردهای عبدل يوسفی, also Romanized as Yūrdhāī-ye 'Abdol Yūsefī) is a village in Sarvestan Rural District, in the Central District of Sarvestan County, Fars province, Iran. At the 2006 census, its population was 168, in 34 families.
