= Pol Gazi =

Village in Razavi Khorasan province, Iran

Pol Gazi Persian: پل گزي
- Village
- Location within Iran
- Coordinates: 36°01′13″N 60°41′41″E
- Country: Iran
- Province: Razavi Khorasan
- County: Sarakhs
- District: Marzdaran
- Rural District: Marzdaran

Population (2016)
  - Total: 35
- Time zone: UTC+3:30 (IRST)

Pol Gazi (Persian: پل گزي) (Note: Also romanized as Pol Gazī) is a village in Marzdaran Rural District of Marzdaran District in Sarakhs County, Razavi Khorasan province, Iran.

== Demographics ==
=== Population ===
At the time of the 2006 National Census, the village's population was 23 in five households. The following census in 2011 counted 28 people in seven households. The 2016 census measured the population of the village as 35 people in 10 households.
