= Bazangan =

Village in Razavi Khorasan province, Iran

Bazangan Persian: بزنگان
- Village
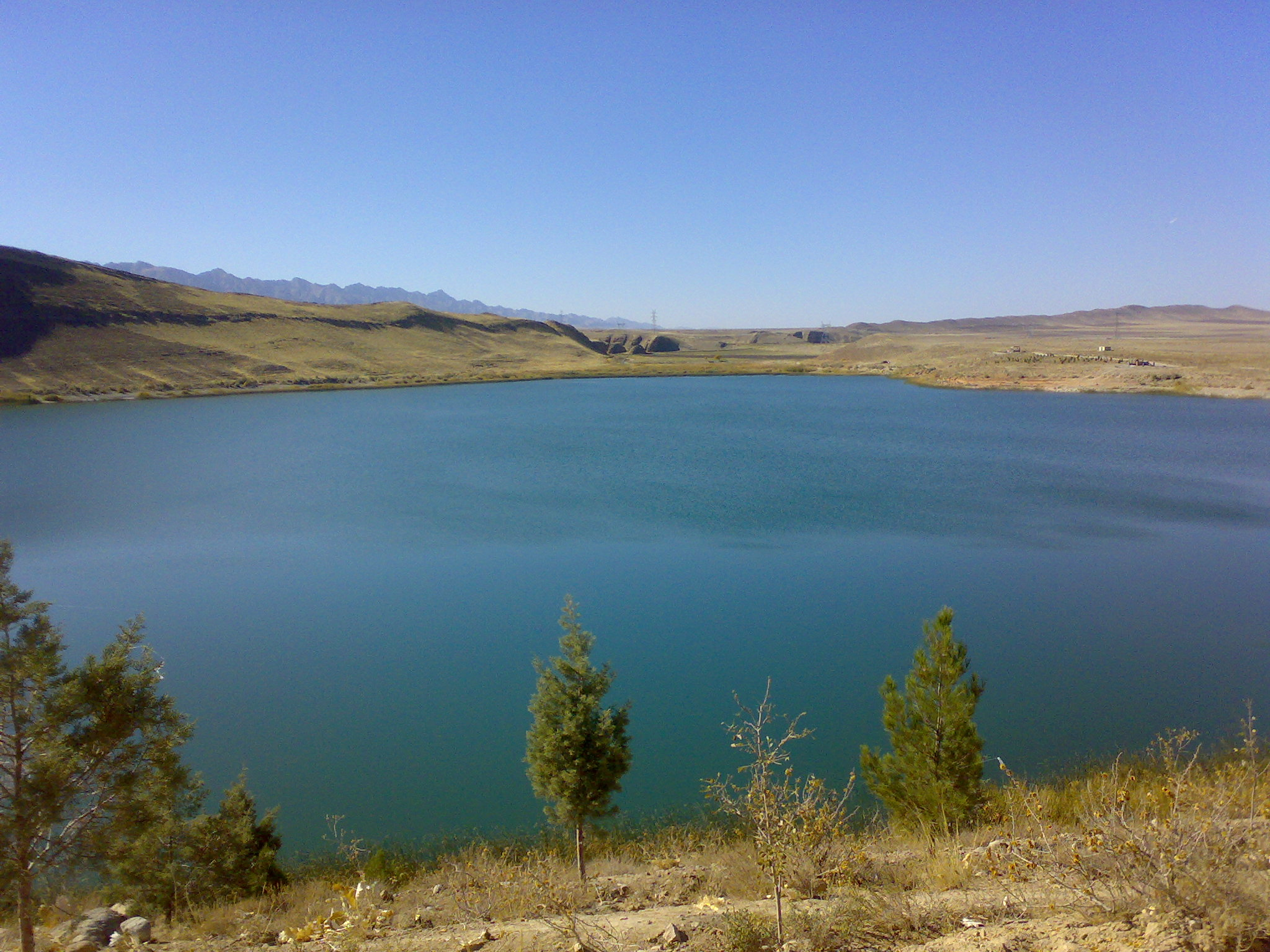
- Bazangan Lake

- Location within Iran
- Coordinates: 36°17′44″N 60°25′50″E
- Country: Iran
- Province: Razavi Khorasan
- County: Sarakhs
- District: Marzdaran
- Rural District: Golbibi

Population (2016)
  - Total: 3,440
- Time zone: UTC+3:30 (IRST)

Bazangan (Persian: بزنگان) (Note: Also romanized as Bazangān and Bezangān; also known as Bezamgān) is a village in, and the capital of, Golbibi Rural District in Marzdaran District of Sarakhs County, Razavi Khorasan province, Iran.

== Demographics ==
=== Population ===
At the time of the 2006 National Census, the village's population was 3,697 in 915 households. The following census in 2011 counted 3,268 people in 946 households. The 2016 census measured the population of the village as 3,440 people in 1,062 households. It was the most populous village in its rural district.

== Geography ==
This village is located 90 km southwest of Sarakhs and on the eastern slope of Bazangan mountain which is one of the functions of Sarakhs city and is located 128 km east of Mashhad in a mountainous area. Bazangan mountain is located 4 km south of Qara Dagh mountain and 6 km west and southwest of the village. Its climate is temperate and dry. the historical castle of Bazangan is located In this village.

The origin of the Mervi family is related to their main birthplace, the city of Mervi, which is now part of Turkmenistan. This city was once part of the territory of Iran when it was separated from Iran during the Qajar rule.

== Sights and historical areas ==
- Bazangan Castle
- Bazangan Lake
- Bazangan Cave
- Karkass Cave
- Spring mill
- Mulberry trees at the entrance of the village
