= Zallughal =

Village in Razavi Khorasan province, Iran

Zallughal Persian: زلوغال
- Village
- Location within Iran
- Coordinates: 36°22′08″N 60°31′44″E
- Country: Iran
- Province: Razavi Khorasan
- County: Sarakhs
- District: Marzdaran
- Rural District: Golbibi

Population (2016)
  - Total: 620
- Time zone: UTC+3:30 (IRST)

Zallughal (Persian: زلوغال) (Note: Also romanized as Zallūghāl; also known as Zallūqāl and Zūllūqāl) is a village in Golbibi Rural District of Marzdaran District in Sarakhs County, Razavi Khorasan province, Iran.

== Demographics ==
=== Population ===
At the time of the 2006 National Census, the village's population was 562 in 125 households. The following census in 2011 counted 607 people in 147 households. The 2016 census measured the population of the village as 620 people in 166 households.
