= Pas Kamar =

Village in Razavi Khorasan province, Iran

Pas Kamar Persian: پس كمر
- Village
- Location within Iran
- Coordinates: 35°59′23″N 61°02′39″E
- Country: Iran
- Province: Razavi Khorasan
- County: Sarakhs
- District: Marzdaran
- Rural District: Pol Khatun

Population (2016)
  - Total: 1,262
- Time zone: UTC+3:30 (IRST)

Pas Kamar (Persian: پس كمر) is a village in, and the capital of, Pol Khatun Rural District in Marzdaran District of Sarakhs County, Razavi Khorasan province, Iran.

== Demographics ==
=== Population ===
At the time of the 2006 National Census, the village's population was 1,121 in 223 households. The following census in 2011 counted 1,128 people in 291 households. The 2016 census measured the population of the village as 1,262 people in 359 households, the most populous in its rural district.
