= Shuricheh =

Shuricheh (Persian: شوريچه), also rendered Shurijeh may refer to:

- Shuricheh-ye Olya
- Shuricheh-ye Sofla
- Shuricheh Rural District, an administrative division of Sarvestan County, Fars province, Iran
