= Chenar Sukhteh, Sarakhs =

Village in Razavi Khorasan province, Iran

Chenar Sukhteh Persian: چنارسوخته
- Village
- Location within Iran
- Coordinates: 36°24′30″N 60°14′59″E
- Country: Iran
- Province: Razavi Khorasan
- County: Sarakhs
- District: Marzdaran
- Rural District: Golbibi

Population (2016)
  - Total: 70
- Time zone: UTC+3:30 (IRST)

Chenar Sukhteh (Persian: چنارسوخته) (Note: Also romanized as Chenār Sūkhteh) is a village in Golbibi Rural District of Marzdaran District in Sarakhs County, Razavi Khorasan province, Iran.

== Demographics ==
=== Population ===
At the time of the 2006 National Census, the village's population was 87 in 19 households. The following census in 2011 counted 75 people in 20 households. The 2016 census measured the population of the village as 70 people in 22 households.
