= Posht-e Par, Sarvestan =

Posht-e Par پشت پر
- Village
- Location within Iran
- Coordinates: 29°19′00″N 52°51′03″E
- Country: Iran
- Province: Fars
- County: Sarvestan
- Bakhsh: Kuhenjan
- Rural District: Maharlu

Population (2006)
  - Total: 528
- Time zone: UTC+3:30 (IRST)
  - Summer (DST): UTC+4:30 (IRDT)

Posht-e Par (Persian: پشت پر, also Romanized as Posht Par; also known as Posht Bar) is a village in Maharlu Rural District, Kuhenjan District, Sarvestan County, Fars province, Iran. At the 2006 census, its population was 528, in 132 families.
