= Kalateh-ye Sahebdad =

Village in Razavi Khorasan province, Iran

Kalateh-ye Sahebdad Persian: كلاته صاحبداد
- Village
- Location within Iran
- Coordinates: 35°59′42″N 61°04′22″E
- Country: Iran
- Province: Razavi Khorasan
- County: Sarakhs
- District: Marzdaran
- Rural District: Pol Khatun

Population (2016)
  - Total: 759
- Time zone: UTC+3:30 (IRST)

Kalateh-ye Sahebdad (Persian: كلاته صاحبداد) (Note: Also romanized as Kalāteh-ye Şāḩebdād; also known as Şāḩebdād) is a village in Pol Khatun Rural District of Marzdaran District in Sarakhs County, Razavi Khorasan province, Iran.

== Demographics ==
=== Population ===
At the time of the 2006 National Census, the village's population was 501 in 91 households. The following census in 2011 counted 582 people in 146 households. The 2016 census measured the population of the village as 759 people in 214 households.
