= Baghak, Razavi Khorasan =

Village in Razavi Khorasan province, Iran

Baghak Persian: باغك
- Village
- Location within Iran
- Coordinates: 36°03′28″N 60°45′54″E
- Country: Iran
- Province: Razavi Khorasan
- County: Sarakhs
- District: Marzdaran
- Rural District: Marzdaran

Population (2016)
  - Total: 249
- Time zone: UTC+3:30 (IRST)

Baghak (Persian: باغك) (Note: Also romanized as Bāghak) is a village in Marzdaran Rural District of Marzdaran District in Sarakhs County, Razavi Khorasan province, Iran.

== Demographics ==
=== Population ===
At the time of the 2006 National Census, the village's population was 235 in 58 households. The following census in 2011 counted 228 people in 55 households. The 2016 census measured the population of the village as 249 people in 64 households.
