= Maharlu Now =

Village in Fars province, Iran

Maharlu Now Persian: مهارلو نو
- Village
- Location within Iran
- Coordinates: 29°21′22″N 52°49′09″E
- Country: Iran
- Province: Fars
- County: Sarvestan
- District: Kuhenjan
- Rural District: Maharlu

Population (2016)
  - Total: 2,381
- Time zone: UTC+3:30 (IRST)

Maharlu Now (Persian: مهارلونو) (Note: Also romanized as Mahārlū Now; also known as Maharin and Mahārlū) is a village in, and the capital of, Maharlu Rural District of Kuhenjan District, Sarvestan County, Fars province, Iran.

== Demographics ==
=== Population ===
At the time of the 2006 National Census, the village's population was 2,168 in 544 households, when it was in the former Sarvestan District of Shiraz County. The following census in 2011 counted 2,467 people in 652 households, by which time the district had been separated from the county in the establishment of Sarvestan County. The rural district was transferred to the new Kuhenjan District. The 2016 census measured the population of the village as 2,381 people in 742 households. It was the most populous village in its rural district.
