= Padehha =

Village in Razavi Khorasan province, Iran

Padehha Persian: پده ها
- Village
- Location within Iran
- Coordinates: 36°05′13″N 60°42′25″E
- Country: Iran
- Province: Razavi Khorasan
- County: Sarakhs
- District: Marzdaran
- Rural District: Marzdaran

Population (2016)
  - Total: 89
- Time zone: UTC+3:30 (IRST)

Padehha (Persian: پده ها) (Note: Also romanized as Padehhā; also known as Padehā) is a village in Marzdaran Rural District of Marzdaran District in Sarakhs County, Razavi Khorasan province, Iran.

== Demographics ==
=== Population ===
At the time of the 2006 National Census, the village's population was 84 in 15 households. The following census in 2011 counted 73 people in 18 households. The 2016 census measured the population of the village as 89 people in 23 households.
