= Hajji Madad =

Village in Razavi Khorasan province, Iran

Hajji Madad Persian: حاجي مدد
- Village
- Location within Iran
- Coordinates: 36°08′04″N 60°56′35″E
- Country: Iran
- Province: Razavi Khorasan
- County: Sarakhs
- District: Marzdaran
- Rural District: Pol Khatun

Population (2016)
  - Total: 182
- Time zone: UTC+3:30 (IRST)

Hajji Madad (Persian: حاجي مدد) (Note: Also romanized as Ḩājjī Madad; also known as Kalāteh-ye Ḩājjī Madad) is a village in Pol Khatun Rural District of Marzdaran District in Sarakhs County, Razavi Khorasan province, Iran.

== Demographics ==
=== Population ===
At the time of the 2006 National Census, the village's population was 147 in 29 households. The following census in 2011 counted 141 people in 32 households. The 2016 census measured the population of the village as 182 people in 50 households.
