= Qarah Qeytan =

Village in Razavi Khorasan province, Iran

Qarah Qeytan Persian: قره قيطان
- Village
- Location within Iran
- Coordinates: 36°01′03″N 60°45′46″E
- Country: Iran
- Province: Razavi Khorasan
- County: Sarakhs
- District: Marzdaran
- Rural District: Marzdaran

Population (2016)
  - Total: 149
- Time zone: UTC+3:30 (IRST)

Qarah Qeytan (Persian: قره قيطان) (Note: Also romanized as Qarah Qeyţān) is a village in Marzdaran Rural District of Marzdaran District in Sarakhs County, Razavi Khorasan province, Iran.

The economy of Qarah Qeytan depends on agriculture and animal husbandry. Carpet weaving with Baluchi designs is common among the Baluchis of the village. There is an airport nearby.

== Demographics ==
=== Population ===
At the time of the 2006 National Census, the village's population was 115 in 30 households. The following census in 2011 counted 97 people in 20 households. The 2016 census measured the population of the village as 149 people in 38 households.
