= Maharlu Kohneh =

Maharlu Kohneh مهارلوكهنه
- Village
- Location within Iran
- Coordinates: 29°23′28″N 52°47′59″E
- Country: Iran
- Province: Fars
- County: Sarvestan
- Bakhsh: Kuhenjan
- Rural District: Maharlu

Population (2006)
  - Total: 620
- Time zone: UTC+3:30 (IRST)
  - Summer (DST): UTC+4:30 (IRDT)

Maharlu Kohneh (Persian: مهارلوكهنه, also Romanized as Mahārlū Kohneh) is a village in Maharlu Rural District, Kuhenjan District, Sarvestan County, Fars province, Iran. At the 2006 census, its population was 620, in 144 families.
