= Shurloq =

Village in Razavi Khorasan province, Iran

Shurloq Persian: شورلق
- Village
- Location within Iran
- Coordinates: 36°19′04″N 60°37′48″E
- Country: Iran
- Province: Razavi Khorasan
- County: Sarakhs
- District: Marzdaran
- Rural District: Marzdaran

Population (2016)
  - Total: 441
- Time zone: UTC+3:30 (IRST)

Shurloq (Persian: شورلق) (Note: Also romanized as Shūrloq; also known as Shoorlogh, Shūrlūkh, and Shūrrukh) is a village in Marzdaran Rural District of Marzdaran District in Sarakhs County, Razavi Khorasan province, Iran.

== Demographics ==
=== Population ===
At the time of the 2006 National Census, the village's population was 412 in 90 households. The following census in 2011 counted 404 people in 97 households. The 2016 census measured the population of the village as 441 people in 111 households.
