= Roknabad, Sarvestan =

Roknabad رکن‌آباد
- Village
- Location within Iran
- Coordinates: 29°13′26″N 53°09′56″E
- Country: Iran
- Province: Fars
- County: Sarvestan
- Bakhsh: Central
- Rural District: Shurjeh

Population (2006)
  - Total: 327
- Time zone: UTC+3:30 (IRST)
  - Summer (DST): UTC+4:30 (IRDT)

Roknabad (Persian: رکن‌آباد, also Romanized as Roknābād; also known as Roknābād-e Sarvestān and Rokn Abad Sarvestan) is a village in Shurjeh Rural District, in the Central District of Sarvestan County, Fars province, Iran. At the 2006 census, its population was 327, in 62 families.
