= Karizak, Sarakhs =

Village in Razavi Khorasan province, Iran

Karizak Persian: كاريزك
- Village
- Location within Iran
- Coordinates: 36°24′28″N 60°26′36″E
- Country: Iran
- Province: Razavi Khorasan
- County: Sarakhs
- District: Marzdaran
- Rural District: Golbibi

Population (2016)
  - Total: 119
- Time zone: UTC+3:30 (IRST)

Karizak (Persian: كاريزك) (Note: Also romanized as Kārīzak) is a village in Golbibi Rural District of Marzdaran District in Sarakhs County, Razavi Khorasan province, Iran.

== Demographics ==
=== Population ===
At the time of the 2006 National Census, the village's population was 129 in 34 households. The following census in 2011 counted 127 people in 39 households. The 2016 census measured the population of the village as 119 people in 42 households.
