= Mowmenabad, Fars =

Mowmenabad مؤمن‌آباد
- village
- Location within Iran
- Coordinates: 29°13′43″N 53°16′52″E
- Country: Iran
- Province: Fars
- County: Sarvestan
- Bakhsh: Central
- Rural District: Shurjeh

Population (2006)
  - Total: 296
- Time zone: UTC+3:30 (IRST)
  - Summer (DST): UTC+4:30 (IRDT)

Mowmenabad (Persian: مؤمن‌آباد, also Romanized as Mow’menābād) is a village in Shurjeh Rural District, in the Central District of Sarvestan County, Fars province, Iran. At the 2006 census, its population was 296, in 69 families.
