= Yekkeh Bid =

Village in Razavi Khorasan province, Iran

Yekkeh Bid Persian: يكه بيد
- Village
- Location within Iran
- Coordinates: 36°22′41″N 60°21′38″E
- Country: Iran
- Province: Razavi Khorasan
- County: Sarakhs
- District: Marzdaran
- Rural District: Golbibi

Population (2016)
  - Total: 85
- Time zone: UTC+3:30 (IRST)

Yekkeh Bid (Persian: يكه بيد) (Note: Also romanized as Yekkeh Bīd) is a village in Golbibi Rural District of Marzdaran District in Sarakhs County, Razavi Khorasan province, Iran.

== Demographics ==
=== Population ===
At the time of the 2006 National Census, the village's population was 98 in 26 households. The following census in 2011 counted 86 people in 23 households. The 2016 census measured the population of the village as 85 people in 28 households.
