= Derakht-e Bid-e Olya =

Village in Razavi Khorasan province, Iran

Derakht-e Bid-e Olya Persian: درخت بيدعليا
- Village
- Location within Iran
- Coordinates: 36°22′30″N 60°19′02″E
- Country: Iran
- Province: Razavi Khorasan
- County: Sarakhs
- District: Marzdaran
- Rural District: Golbibi

Population (2016)
  - Total: 26
- Time zone: UTC+3:30 (IRST)

Derakht-e Bid-e Olya (Persian: درخت بيدعليا) (Note: Also romanized as Derakht-e Bīd-e ‘Olyā; also known as Derakht-e Bīd-e Bālā) is a village in Golbibi Rural District of Marzdaran District in Sarakhs County, Razavi Khorasan province, Iran.

== Demographics ==
=== Population ===
At the time of the 2006 National Census, the village's population was 38 in 11 households. The following census in 2011 counted 16 people in five households. The 2016 census measured the population of the village as 26 people in 11 households.
