= Angosht Gabri Castle =

Castle in Fars province, Iran

- قلعه انگشت گبری
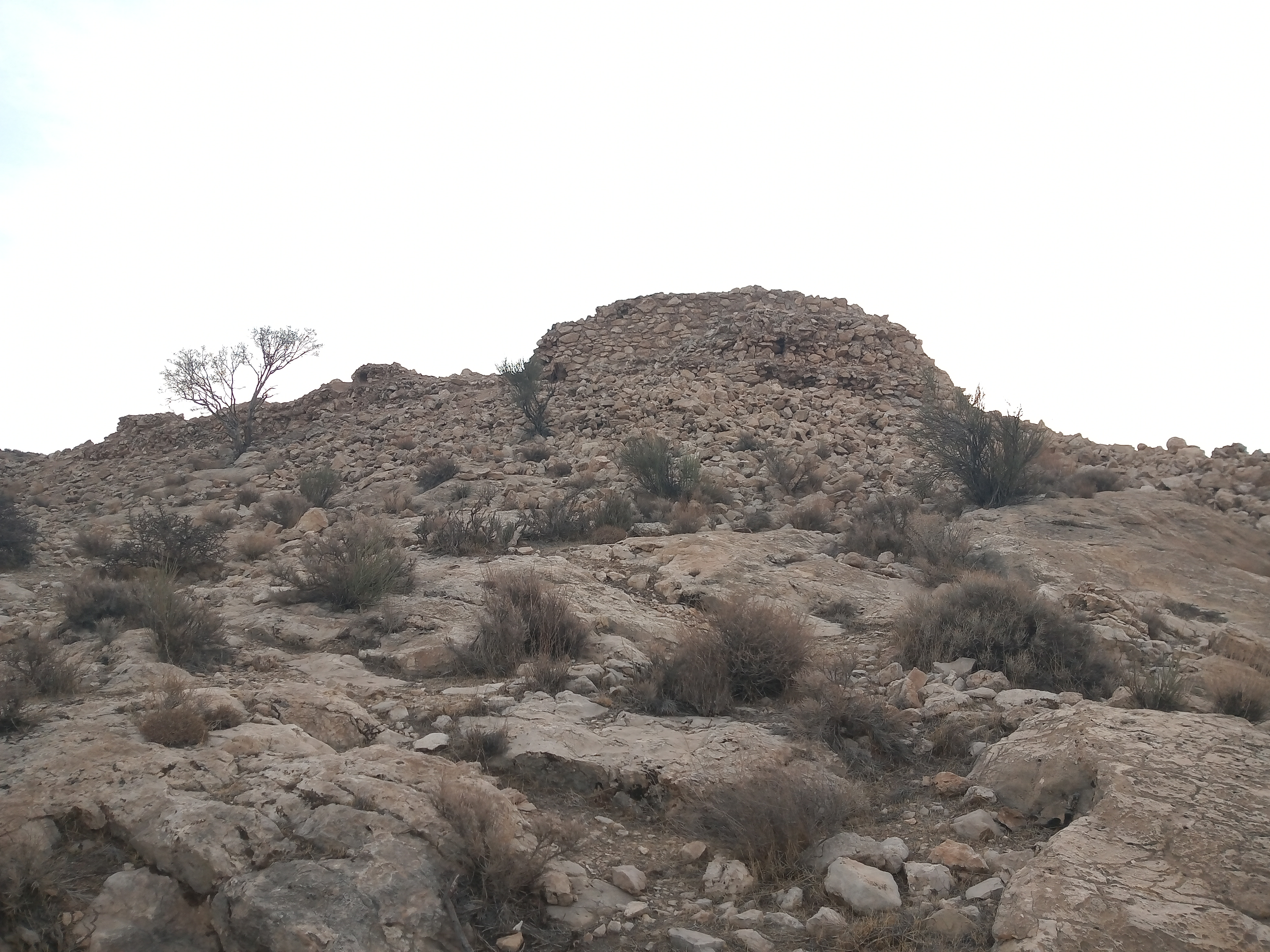
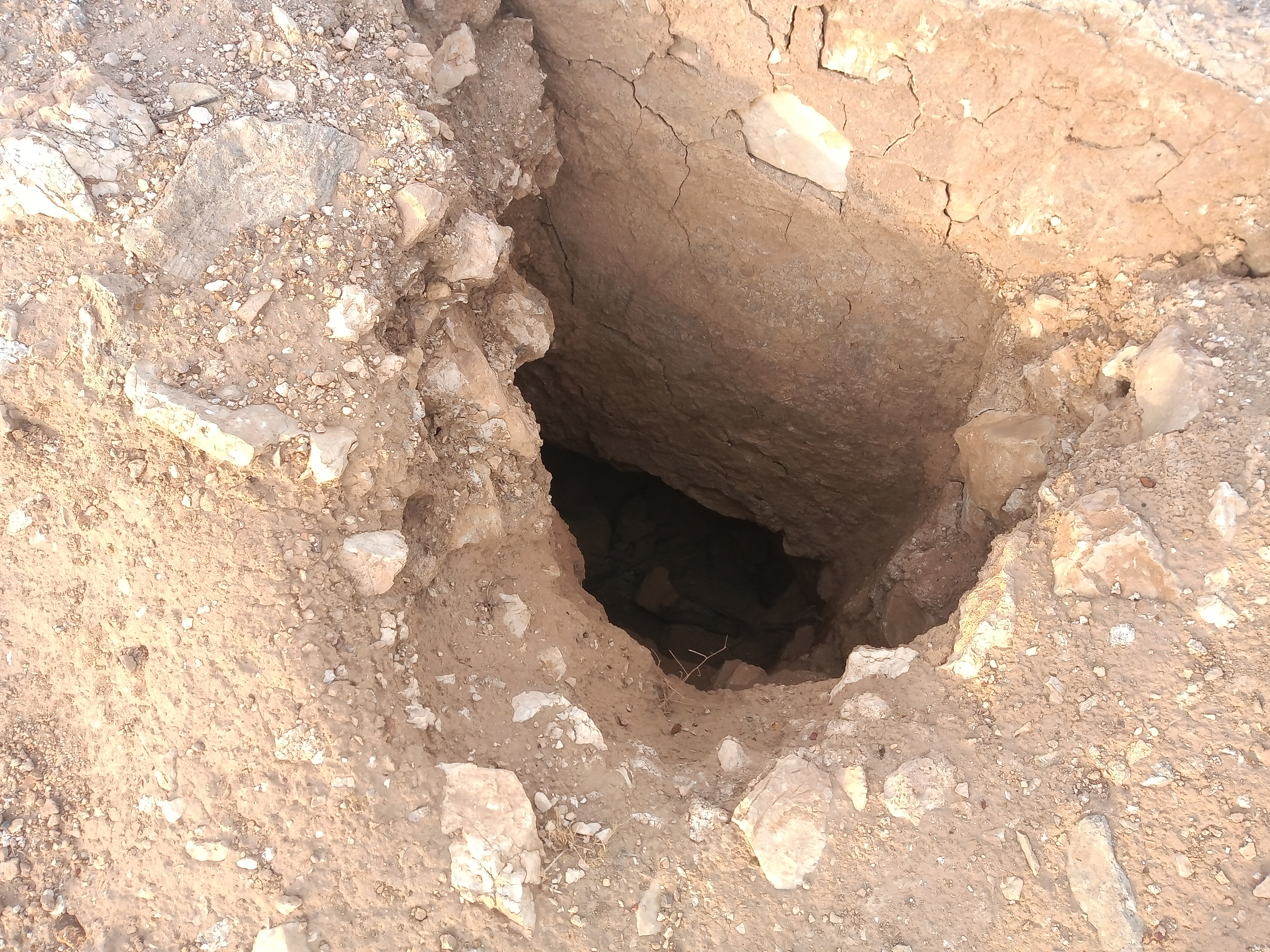
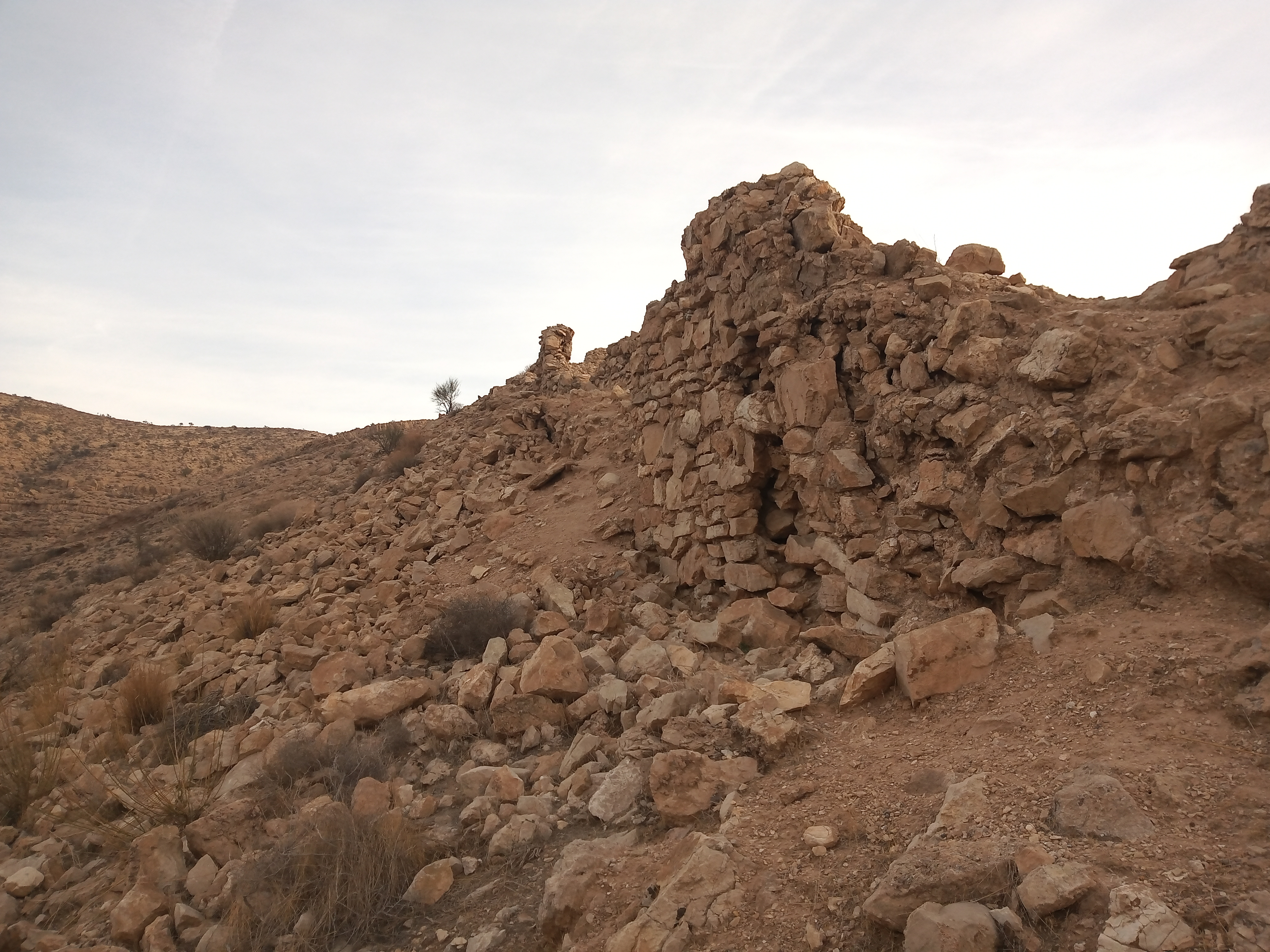
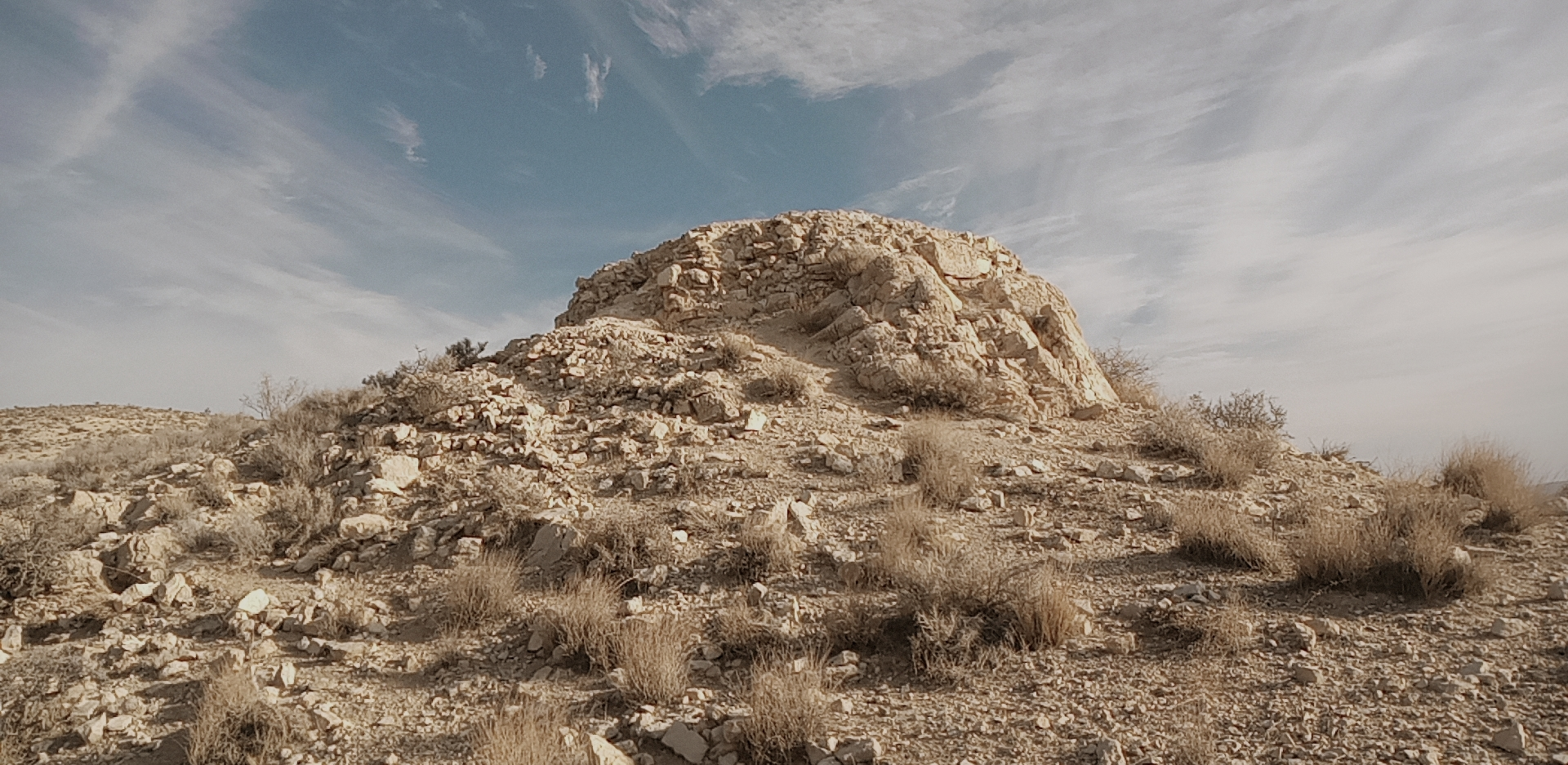
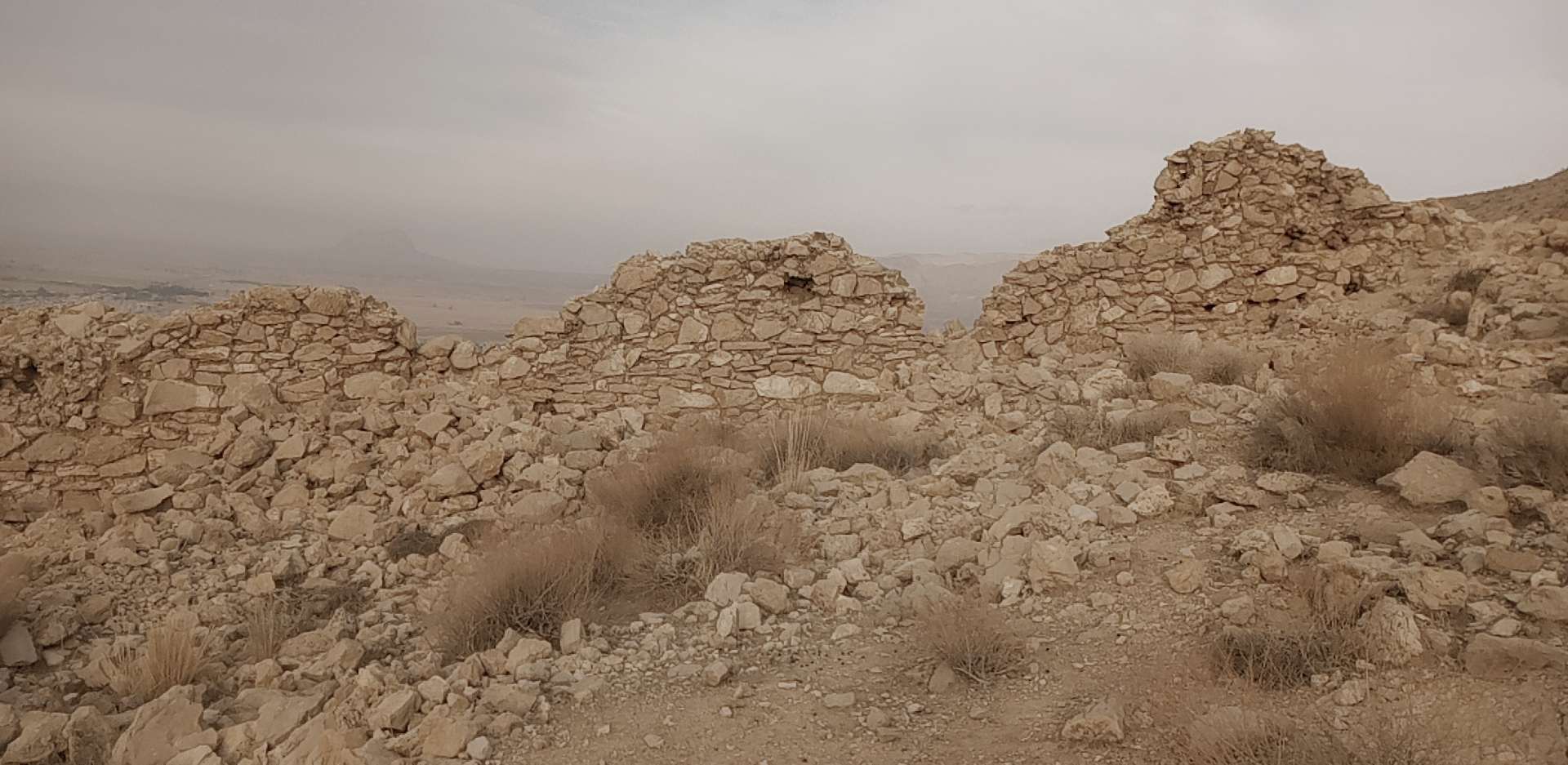
- Interactive map of the Angosht Gabri Castle area

General information
- Type: Castle
- Location: Sarvestan County, Iran
- Coordinates: 29°10′N 53°08′E

Angosht Gabri Castle (Persian: قلعه انگشت گبری) is a historical castle located in Sarvestan County in Fars province, The longevity of this fortress dates back to the Sasanian Empire.
