= Darband-e Olya, Sarakhs =

Village in Razavi Khorasan province, Iran

Darband-e Olya Persian: دربندعليا
- Village
- Location within Iran
- Coordinates: 36°01′08″N 60°48′46″E
- Country: Iran
- Province: Razavi Khorasan
- County: Sarakhs
- District: Marzdaran
- Rural District: Marzdaran

Population (2016)
  - Total: 0
- Time zone: UTC+3:30 (IRST)

Darband-e Olya (Persian: دربندعليا) (Note: Also romanized as Darband-e 'Olyā; also known as Aq Darband and Ma‘dan-e Āqdarband) is a village in Marzdaran Rural District of Marzdaran District in Sarakhs County, Razavi Khorasan province, Iran.

== Demographics ==
=== Population ===
At the time of the 2006 National Census, the village's population was 52 in 14 households. The following census in 2011 counted 34 people in 11 households. The 2016 census measured the population of the village as zero.
