= Rahmatabad, Sarakhs =

Village in Razavi Khorasan province, Iran

Rahmatabad Persian: رحمت اباد
- Village
- Location within Iran
- Country: Iran
- Province: Razavi Khorasan
- County: Sarakhs
- District: Marzdaran
- Rural District: Marzdaran

Population (2016)
  - Total: 30
- Time zone: UTC+3:30 (IRST)

Rahmatabad (Persian: رحمت اباد) (Note: Also romanized as Raḩmatābād; also known as Qal‘eh Sangī, Qal‘eh Sangī-ye Raḩmatābād, and Sarsarī) is a village in Marzdaran Rural District of Marzdaran District in Sarakhs County, Razavi Khorasan province, Iran.

== Demographics ==
=== Population ===
At the time of the 2006 National Census, the village's population was 135 in 32 households. The following census in 2011 counted 69 people in 18 households. The 2016 census measured the population of the village as 30 people in eight households.

== Geography ==
This village is located 95 km southwest of the city of Sarakhs and next to Kashaf river. Its altitude is 695 meters above sea level and its climate is temperate and dry and located in the mountains.

== Anthropology ==
The people of the village are from the Shahsevan and Qashqai tribes who were forced to move to this area during the reign of Reza Shah due to fear of the Shahsevans' taking power.
