= Sheikh Yusof Sarvestani =

13th-century

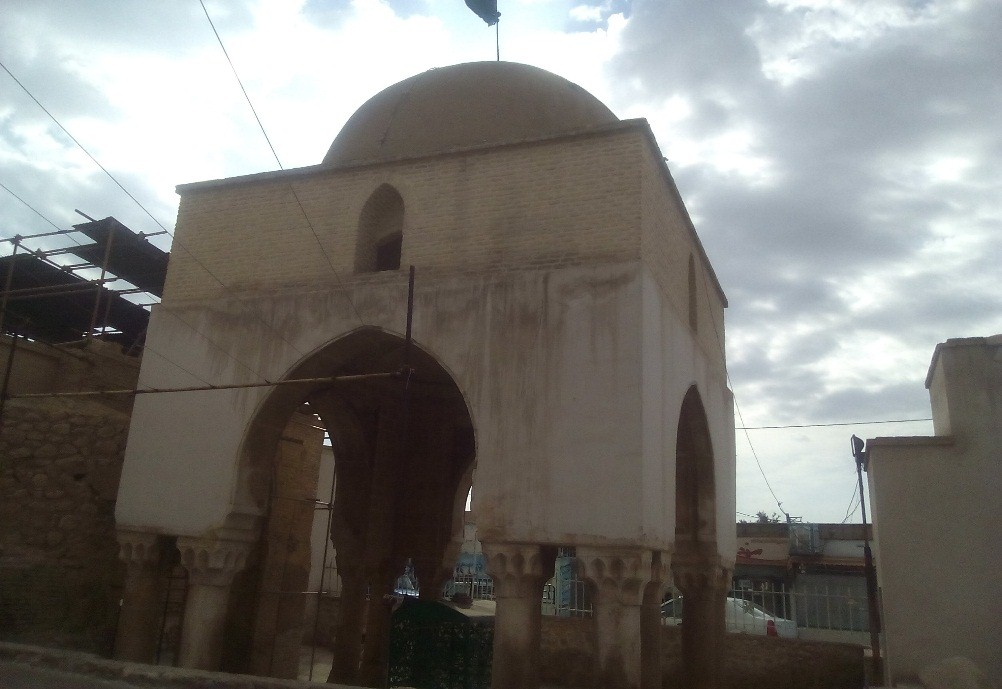
- Tomb of Sheikh Yusof Sarvestani
- Born: Unknown; Sarvestan, Iran
- Died: 1281; Sarvestan

Philosophical work
- Era: Islamic golden age
- School: Sufism
- Main interests: astronomy, calligraphy, mysticism

Sheikh Yusof bin Ya'qub Sarvestani (Persian: شیخ یوسف بن یعقوب سروستانی) (died 1281 AD) was an astronomer, calligrapher and philosopher of Iranian Sunnis in the Ilkhanate period. The tomb of Sheikh Yusof Sarvestani is located in the city center of Sarvestan, adjacent to the field with the same name.
