= Derakht-e Bid-e Sofla =

Village in Razavi Khorasan province, Iran

Derakht-e Bid-e Sofla Persian: درخت بيدسفلي
- Village
- Location within Iran
- Coordinates: 36°23′43″N 60°20′56″E
- Country: Iran
- Province: Razavi Khorasan
- County: Sarakhs
- District: Marzdaran
- Rural District: Golbibi

Population (2016)
  - Total: 65
- Time zone: UTC+3:30 (IRST)

Derakht-e Bid-e Sofla (Persian: درخت بيدسفلي) (Note: Also romanized as Derakht-e Bīd-e Soflá; also known as Derakht-e Bīd-e Pā’īn) is a village in Golbibi Rural District of Marzdaran District in Sarakhs County, Razavi Khorasan province, Iran.

== Demographics ==
=== Population ===
At the time of the 2006 National Census, the village's population was 67 in 19 households. The following census in 2011 counted 55 people in 18 households. The 2016 census measured the population of the village as 65 people in 21 households.
