= Shuricheh-ye Olya =

Village in Razavi Khorasan province, Iran

Shuricheh-ye Olya Persian: شوريچه عليا
- Village
- Location within Iran
- Coordinates: 36°01′37″N 60°56′11″E
- Country: Iran
- Province: Razavi Khorasan
- County: Sarakhs
- District: Marzdaran
- Rural District: Pol Khatun

Population (2016)
  - Total: 488
- Time zone: UTC+3:30 (IRST)

Shuricheh-ye Olya (Persian: شوريچه عليا) (Note: Also romanized as Shūrīcheh-ye ‘Olyā; also known as Shūrījeh-ye ‘Olyā) is a village in Pol Khatun Rural District of Marzdaran District in Sarakhs County, Razavi Khorasan province, Iran.

== Demographics ==
=== Population ===
At the time of the 2006 National Census, the village's population was 488 in 96 households. The following census in 2011 counted 451 people in 118 households. The 2016 census measured the population of the village as 488 people in 129 households.
