= Shuricheh-ye Sofla =

Village in Razavi Khorasan province, Iran

Shuricheh-ye Sofla Persian: شوريچه سفلي
- Village
- Location within Iran
- Coordinates: 36°00′07″N 60°58′13″E
- Country: Iran
- Province: Razavi Khorasan
- County: Sarakhs
- District: Marzdaran
- Rural District: Pol Khatun

Population (2016)
  - Total: 268
- Time zone: UTC+3:30 (IRST)

Shuricheh-ye Sofla (Persian: شوريچه سفلي) (Note: Also romanized as Shūrīcheh-ye Soflá; also known as New Shurijāh, Sehpanja, Shūrīcheh, Shūrījeh, Shūrījeh-ye Pā’īn, and Shūrījeh-ye Soflá) is a village in Pol Khatun Rural District of Marzdaran District in Sarakhs County, Razavi Khorasan province, Iran.

== Demographics ==
=== Population ===
At the time of the 2006 National Census, the village's population was 329 in 74 households. The following census in 2011 counted 232 people in 55 households. The 2016 census measured the population of the village as 268 people in 68 households.
