= Shalghami-ye Sofla =

Village in Razavi Khorasan province, Iran

Shalghami-ye Sofla Persian: شلغمي سفلي
- Village
- Location within Iran
- Coordinates: 35°56′48″N 61°06′48″E
- Country: Iran
- Province: Razavi Khorasan
- County: Sarakhs
- District: Marzdaran
- Rural District: Pol Khatun

Population (2016)
  - Total: 274
- Time zone: UTC+3:30 (IRST)

Shalghami-ye Sofla (Persian: شلغمي سفلي) (Note: Also romanized as Shalghamī-ye Soflá; also known as Shalghami-ye Ḩājj Moḩammad (شلغمي حاج محمد) and Shalghamī-ye Pā’īn) is a village in Pol Khatun Rural District of Marzdaran District in Sarakhs County, Razavi Khorasan province, Iran.

== Demographics ==
=== Population ===
At the time of the 2006 National Census, the village's population was 253 in 43 households. The following census in 2011 counted 208 people in 45 households. The 2016 census measured the population of the village as 274 people in 68 households.
