= Shalghami-ye Olya =

Village in Razavi Khorasan province, Iran

Shalghami-ye Olya Persian: شلغمي عليا
- Village
- Location within Iran
- Coordinates: 35°56′42″N 61°06′11″E
- Country: Iran
- Province: Razavi Khorasan
- County: Sarakhs
- District: Marzdaran
- Rural District: Pol Khatun

Population (2016)
  - Total: 392
- Time zone: UTC+3:30 (IRST)

Shalghami-ye Olya (Persian: شلغمي عليا) (Note: Also romanized as Shalghamī-ye ‘Olyā; also known as Shalghamī-ye Bālā and Shalghamī-ye Ḩājj Melāqādar (شلغمي حاج ملاقادر)) is a village in Pol Khatun Rural District of Marzdaran District in Sarakhs County, Razavi Khorasan province, Iran.

== Demographics ==
=== Population ===
At the time of the 2006 National Census, the village's population was 279 in 52 households. The following census in 2011 counted 234 people in 54 households. The 2016 census measured the population of the village as 392 people in 100 households.
