= Bid Sukhteh, Razavi Khorasan =

Village in Razavi Khorasan province, Iran

Bid Sukhteh Persian: بيدسوخته
- Village
- Location within Iran
- Coordinates: 36°20′39″N 60°20′43″E
- Country: Iran
- Province: Razavi Khorasan
- County: Sarakhs
- District: Marzdaran
- Rural District: Golbibi

Population (2016)
  - Total: 28
- Time zone: UTC+3:30 (IRST)

Bid Sukhteh (Persian: بيدسوخته) (Note: Also romanized as Bīd Sūkhteh) is a village in Golbibi Rural District of Marzdaran District in Sarakhs County, Razavi Khorasan province, Iran.

== Demographics ==
=== Population ===
At the time of the 2006 National Census, the village's population was 59 in 15 households. The following census in 2011 counted 25 people in seven households. The 2016 census measured the population of the village as 28 people in seven households.
