= Qarah Sangi =

Village in Razavi Khorasan province, Iran

Qarah Sangi Persian: قره سنگي
- Village
- Location within Iran
- Coordinates: 35°56′43″N 61°08′12″E
- Country: Iran
- Province: Razavi Khorasan
- County: Sarakhs
- District: Marzdaran
- Rural District: Pol Khatun

Population (2016)
  - Total: 919
- Time zone: UTC+3:30 (IRST)

Qarah Sangi (Persian: قره سنگي) (Note: Also romanized as Qarah Sangī and Qareh Sangī; also known as Qal‘eh Sangī (قلعه سنگي)) is a village in Pol Khatun Rural District of Marzdaran District in Sarakhs County, Razavi Khorasan province, Iran.

The village is located 95 km south of the city of Sarakhs and at the confluence of the Hari and Kashf Rivers on the Iran–Turkmenistan border. Its altitude is 400 meters above sea level and its climate is hot and dry mountainous.

== Demographics ==
=== Population ===
At the time of the 2006 National Census, the village's population was 713 in 134 households. The following census in 2011 counted 546 people in 134 households. The 2016 census measured the population of the village as 919 people in 231 households.
