= Darband-e Sofla, Sarakhs =

Village in Razavi Khorasan province, Iran

Darband-e Sofla Persian: دربندسفلي
- Village
- Location within Iran
- Coordinates: 36°01′14″N 60°48′57″E
- Country: Iran
- Province: Razavi Khorasan
- County: Sarakhs
- District: Marzdaran
- Rural District: Marzdaran

Population (2016)
  - Total: 142
- Time zone: UTC+3:30 (IRST)

Darband-e Sofla (Persian: دربندسفلي) (Note: Also romanized as Darband-e Soflá; also known as Āq Darband) is a village in Marzdaran Rural District of Marzdaran District in Sarakhs County, Razavi Khorasan province, Iran.

== Demographics ==
=== Population ===
At the time of the 2006 National Census, the village's population was 58 in 18 households. The following census in 2011 counted 71 people in 18 households. The 2016 census measured the population of the village as 142 people in 57 households.
