= Pol Khatun Rural District =

Rural district in Razavi Khorasan province, Iran

Pol Khatun Rural District Persian: دهستان پل خاتون
- Rural District
- Location within Iran
- Coordinates: 36°02′N 60°58′E
- Country: Iran
- Province: Razavi Khorasan
- County: Sarakhs
- District: Marzdaran
- Established: 1986
- Capital: Pas Kamar

Population (2016)
  - Total: 6,532
- Time zone: UTC+3:30 (IRST)

Pol Khatun Rural District (Persian: دهستان پل خاتون) is in Marzdaran District of Sarakhs County, Razavi Khorasan province, Iran. Its capital is the village of Pas Kamar.

== Demographics ==
=== Population ===
At the time of the 2006 National Census, the rural district's population was 5,821 in 1,122 households. There were 4,966 inhabitants in 1,229 households at the following census of 2011. The 2016 census measured the population of the rural district as 6,532 in 1,765 households. The most populous of its 26 villages was Pas Kamar, with 1,262 people.

=== Other villages in the rural district ===
- Deraz Ab
- Hajji Madad
- Kalateh-ye Keyani
- Kalateh-ye Sahebdad
- Khodadad
- Padali
- Qarah Sangi
- Sadrabad
- Shakrallah
- Shalghami-ye Olya
- Shalghami-ye Sofla
- Shur Ab-e Olya
- Shur Ab-e Sofla
- Shur Ab-e Vosta
- Shuricheh-ye Olya
- Shuricheh-ye Sofla
