= Mazdavand =

City in Razavi Khorasan province, Iran

Mazdavand Persian: مزدآوند
- City
- Location within Iran
- Coordinates: 36°09′15″N 60°31′44″E
- Country: Iran
- Province: Razavi Khorasan
- County: Sarakhs
- District: Marzdaran
- Established as a city: 2004

Population (2016)
  - Total: 1,241
- Time zone: UTC+3:30 (IRST)

Mazdavand (Persian: مزدآوند) (Note: Formerly, Marzdaran (مرزداران), also romanized as Marzdārān; also known as Mazdarān, Mozdarān, and Mozdūrān) is a city in, and the capital of, Marzdaran District in Sarakhs County, Razavi Khorasan province, Iran. It also serves as the administrative center for Marzdaran Rural District. The village of Mazdavand was converted to a city in 2004.

Mazdavand has an important strategic position and is considered as the entrance gate of Sarakhs. Near this village is Mazdavand Cave, which is of strategic importance.

== Demographics ==
=== Language ===
Most of the people in this city speak Persian and some others Baluchi and Turkish.

=== Population ===
At the time of the 2006 National Census, the city population was 1,028 in 248 households. The following census in 2011 counted 1,559 people in 292 households. The 2016 census measured the population of the city as 1,241 people in 329 households.
