= Tomb of Sheikh Yusof Sarvestani =

Historic tomb in Iran

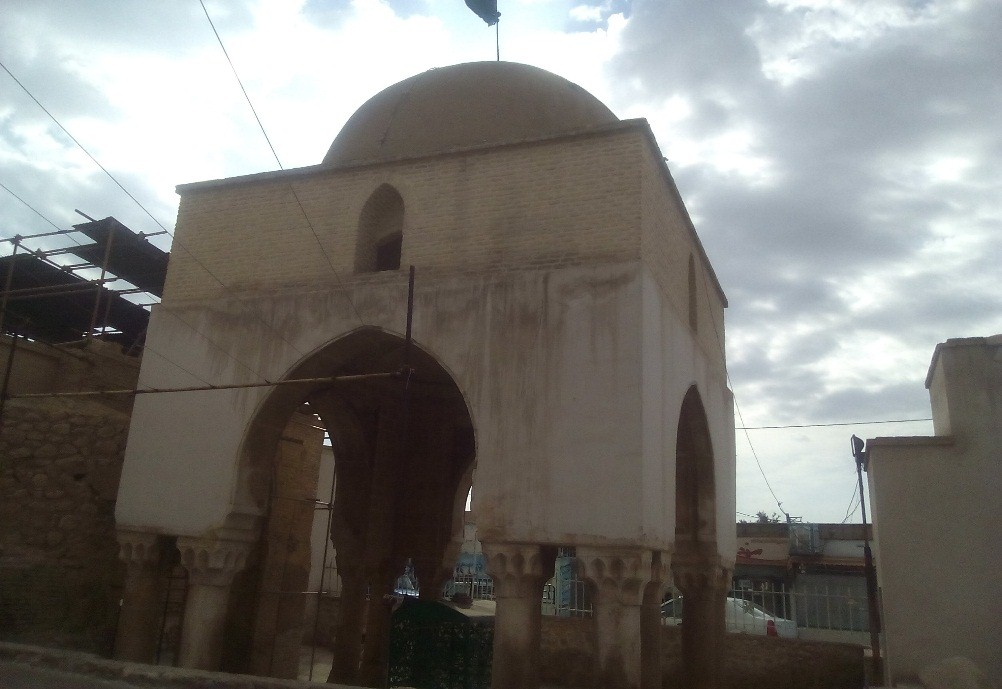
- Location: Sarvestan, Fars province, Iran
- Coordinates: 29°16′25″N 53°13′13″E
- Designer: Master architect Ali bin Hussein Ali Al Fazzi
- Completion date: 1314
- Dedicated to: Sheikh Yusof Sarvestani

The Tomb of Sheikh Yusof Sarvestani (Persian: آرامگاه شیخ یوسف سروستانی) is a tomb complex composed of a decorative edifice erected in honour of Sheikh Yusof Sarvestani, astronomer, calligrapher and Philosopher located in Sarvestan, Fars province. It was built in the early 1314 AD during the Ilkhanate and uses mainly elements of Islamic architecture. The construction of the mausoleum as well as its aesthetic design is a reflection of the cultural, and geo-political status of Iran at the time.

== Gallery ==
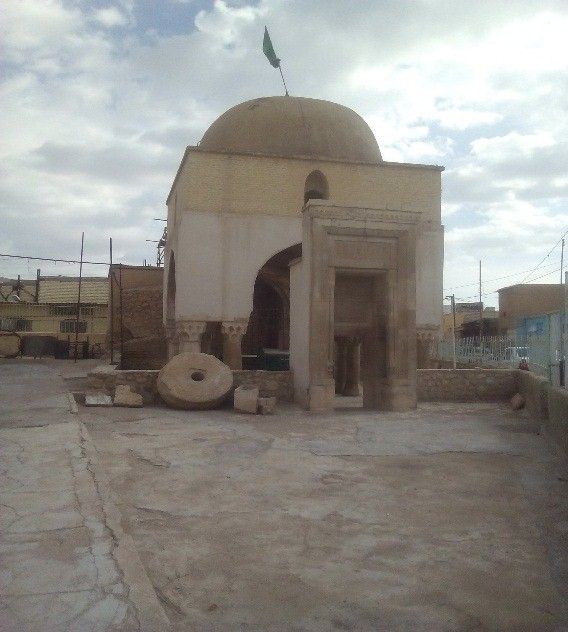
Exterior of the tomb

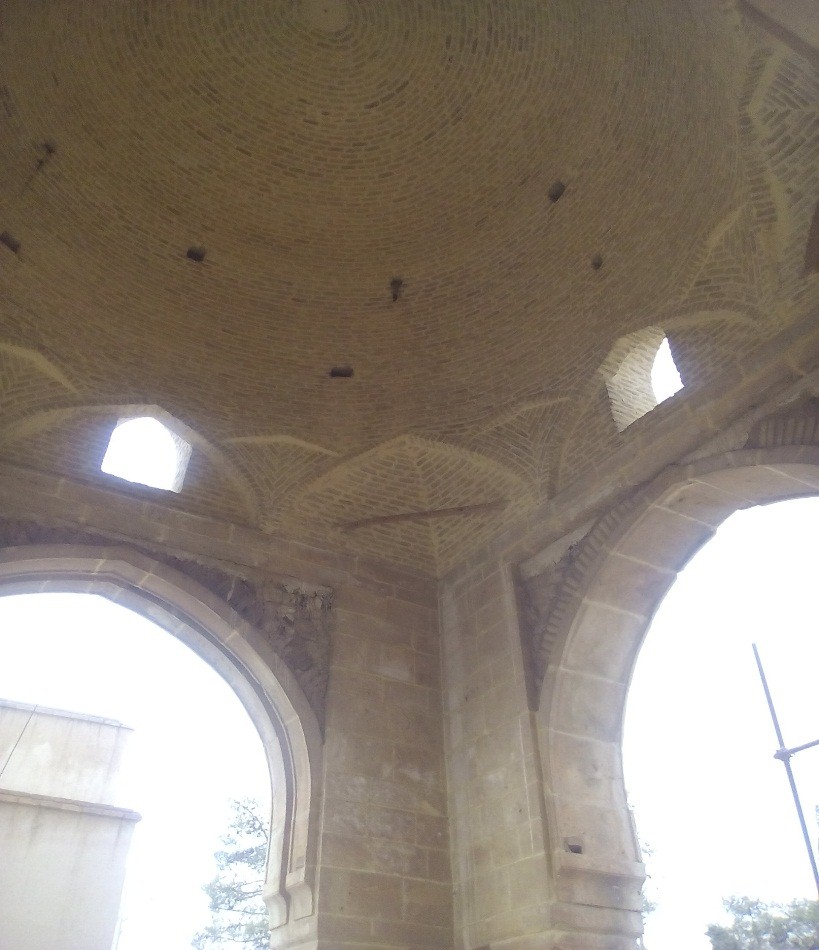
Interior of the tomb

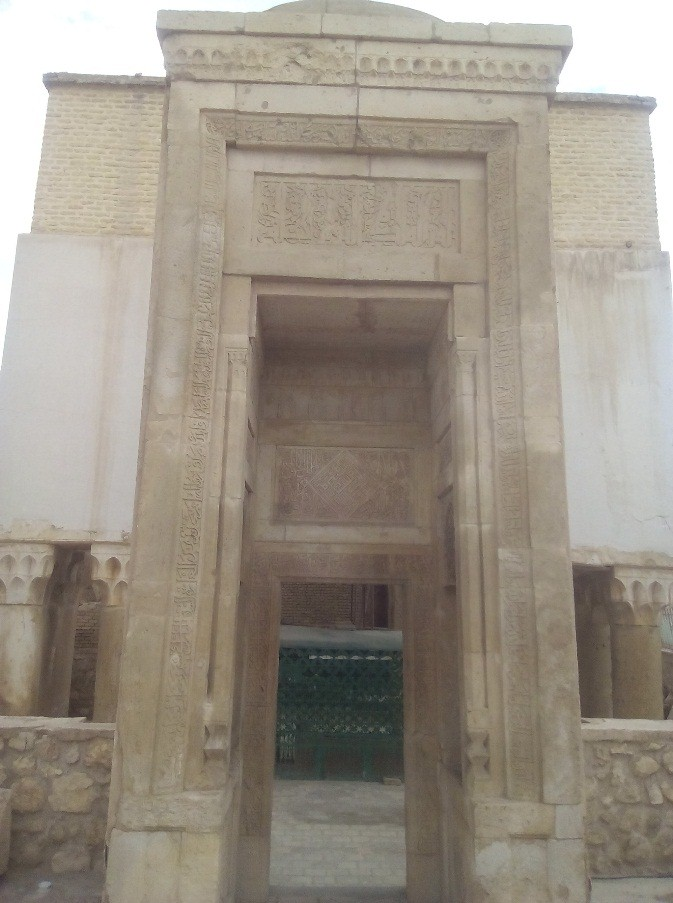
Western entrance

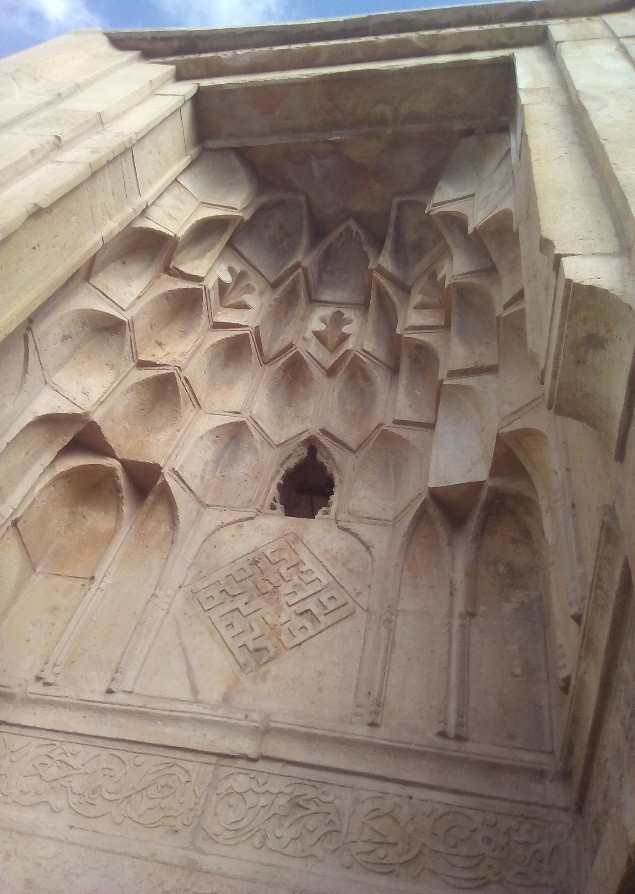
Eastern entrance

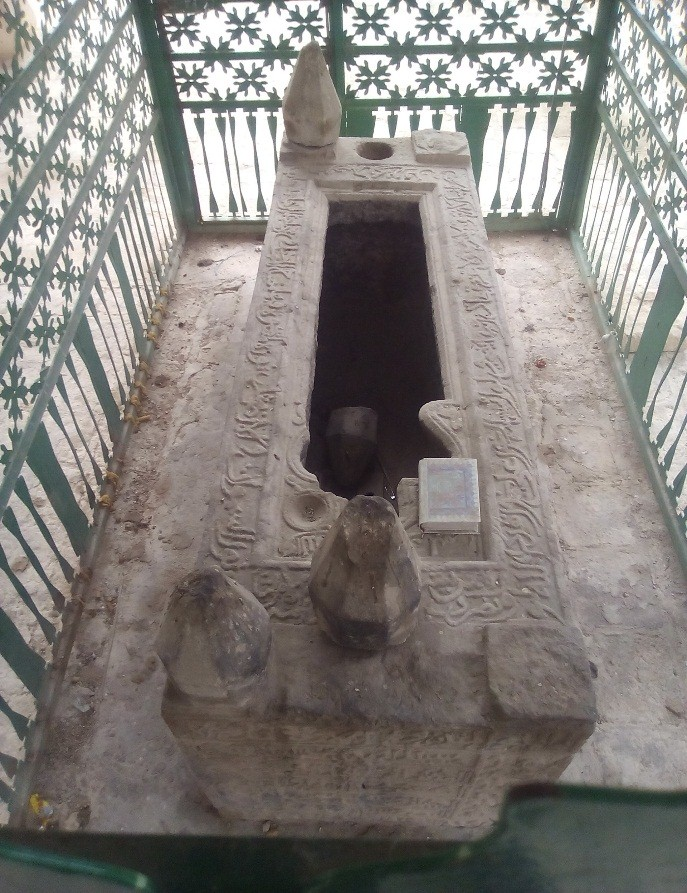
Sepulchre

== See also ==
- Sheikh Yusof Sarvestani
- Islamic architecture
