= Marzdaran Rural District =

Rural district in Razavi Khorasan province, Iran

Marzdaran Rural District Persian: دهستان مرزداران
- Rural District
- Location within Iran
- Coordinates: 36°09′N 60°36′E
- Country: Iran
- Province: Razavi Khorasan
- County: Sarakhs
- District: Marzdaran
- Established: 1986
- Capital: Mazdavand

Population (2016)
  - Total: 2,914
- Time zone: UTC+3:30 (IRST)

Marzdaran Rural District (Persian: دهستان مرزداران) is in Marzdaran District of Sarakhs County, Razavi Khorasan province, Iran. It is administered from the city of Mazdavand.

== Demographics ==
=== Population ===
At the time of the 2006 National Census, the rural district's population was 2,993 in 712 households. There were 2,882 inhabitants in 726 households at the following census of 2011. The 2016 census measured the population of the rural district as 2,914 in 820 households. The most populous of its 26 villages was Chakudar, with 863 people.

=== Other villages in the rural district ===
- Bagh Baghu
- Baghak
- Darband-e Olya
- Darband-e Sofla
- Madan-e Zaghal Sang-e Aq Darband
- Padehha
- Pol Gazi
- Qarah Qeytan
- Rahmatabad
- Shurloq
