= Golbibi Rural District =

Rural district in Razavi Khorasan province, Iran

Golbibi Rural District Persian: دهستان گل بي بي
- Rural District
- Location within Iran
- Coordinates: 36°20′N 60°24′E
- Country: Iran
- Province: Razavi Khorasan
- County: Sarakhs
- District: Marzdaran
- Established: 1986
- Capital: Bazangan

Population (2016)
  - Total: 6,121
- Time zone: UTC+3:30 (IRST)

Golbibi Rural District (Persian: دهستان گل بي بي) is in Marzdaran District of Sarakhs County, Razavi Khorasan province, Iran. Its capital is the village of Bazangan.

== Demographics ==
=== Population ===
At the time of the 2006 National Census, the rural district's population was 6,278 in 1,536 households. There were 5,753 inhabitants in 1,621 households at the following census of 2011. The 2016 census measured the population of the rural district as 6,121 in 1,852 households. The most populous of its 23 villages was Bazangan, with 3,440 people.

=== Other villages in the rural district ===
- Abderaz
- Bid Sukhteh
- Chenar Sukhteh
- Derakht-e Bid-e Olya
- Derakht-e Bid-e Sofla
- Ertinj
- Jahangir-e Olya
- Kalateh-ye Avaz
- Karizak
- Qerqereh
- Yekkeh Bid
- Zallughal
