= Roknabad-ye Do =

Roknabad-ye Do رکن‌آباد ۲
- Village
- Location within Iran
- Coordinates: 29°56′56″N 56°24′31″E
- Country: Iran
- Province: Kerman
- County: Bardsir
- Bakhsh: Central
- Rural District: Kuh Panj

Population (2006)
  - Total: 90
- Time zone: UTC+3:30 (IRST)
  - Summer (DST): UTC+4:30 (IRDT)

Roknabad-ye Do (Persian: رکن‌آباد ۲, also Romanized as Roknābād-e Do; also known as Roknābād) is a village in Kuh Panj Rural District, in the Central District of Bardsir County, Kerman Province, Iran. At the 2006 census, its population was 90, in 16 families.
