= Qaleh Sangi, East Azerbaijan =

Qaleh Sangi قلعه سنگي
- Village
- Location within Iran
- Coordinates: 37°26′24″N 48°09′22″E
- Country: Iran
- Province: East Azerbaijan
- County: Meyaneh
- Bakhsh: Kaghazkonan
- Rural District: Kaghazkonan-e Shomali

Population (2006)
  - Total: 113
- Time zone: UTC+3:30 (IRST)
  - Summer (DST): UTC+4:30 (IRDT)

Qaleh Sangi (Persian: قلعه سنگي, also Romanized as Qal‘eh Sangī; also known as Qal‘eh Sang) is a village in Kaghazkonan-e Shomali Rural District, Kaghazkonan District, Meyaneh County, East Azerbaijan Province, Iran. At the 2006 census, its population was 113, in 32 families.
