= Qaleh Sangi, Fars =

Qaleh Sangi قلعه سنگي
- Village
- Location within Iran
- Coordinates: 30°23′40″N 53°33′34″E
- Country: Iran
- Province: Fars
- County: Bavanat
- Bakhsh: Central
- Rural District: Simakan

Population (2006)
  - Total: 124
- Time zone: UTC+3:30 (IRST)
  - Summer (DST): UTC+4:30 (IRDT)

Qaleh Sangi (Persian: قلعه سنگي, also Romanized as Qal‘eh Sangī) is a village in Simakan Rural District, in the Central District of Bavanat County, Fars province, Iran. At the 2006 census, its population was 124, in 30 families.
