= Gaz-e Kheng =

Gazekhong گزخنگ
- Village
- Location within Iran
- Coordinates: 30°12′02″N 53°30′54″E
- Country: Iran
- Province: Fars
- County: Bavanat
- Bakhsh: Sarchehan
- Rural District: Bagh Safa

Population (2006)
  - Total: 209
- Time zone: UTC+3:30 (IRST)
  - Summer (DST): UTC+4:30 (IRDT)

GazeKhong (Persian: گزخنگ, also Romanized as GazeKhong; also known as Bīd-e Sūkhteh) is a village in Bagh Safa Rural District, Sarchehan District, Bavanat County, Fars province, Iran. At the 2006 census, its population was 209, in 50 families.
