= Kuhenjan, Sarvestan =

City in Fars province, Iran

Kuhenjan Persian: كوهنجان
- City
- Location within Iran
- Coordinates: 29°13′48″N 52°57′20″E
- Country: Iran
- Province: Fars
- County: Sarvestan
- District: Kuhenjan

Population (2016)
  - Total: 3,281
- Time zone: UTC+3:30 (IRST)

Kuhenjan (Persian: كوهنجان) (Note: Also romanized as Koohenjan, Kūhanjān and Kūhenjān; also known as Kūh-e Īnjūn and Kūhinjūn) is a city in, and the capital of, Kuhenjan District of Sarvestan County, Fars province, Iran. It also serves as the administrative center for Kuhenjan Rural District.

== Demographics ==
=== Population ===
At the time of the 2006 National Census, Kuhenjan's population was 2,930 in 750 households, when it was a village in Kuhenjan Rural District of the former Sarvestan District of Shiraz County. The following census in 2011 counted 3,739 people in 1,036 households, by which time the district had been separated from the county in the establishment of Sarvestan County. The rural district was transferred to the new Kuhenjan District, and Kuhenjan was elevated to the status of a city. The 2016 census measured the population of the city as 3,281 people in 1,041 households.
