= Mowmenabad, Bardsir =

Mowmenabad مؤمن‌آباد
- village
- Location within Iran
- Coordinates: 29°55′20″N 56°27′31″E
- Country: Iran
- Province: Kerman
- County: Bardsir
- Bakhsh: Central
- Rural District: Kuh Panj

Population (2006)
  - Total: 170
- Time zone: UTC+3:30 (IRST)
  - Summer (DST): UTC+4:30 (IRDT)

Mowmenabad (Persian: مؤمن‌آباد, also Romanized as Mow’menābād and Mowmenābād; also known as Mo’menābād) is a village in Kuh Panj Rural District, in the Central District of Bardsir County, Kerman Province, Iran. At the 2006 census, its population was 170, in 40 families.
