= Roknabad, Hormozgan =

Roknabad رکن‌آباد
- Village
- Location within Iran
- Coordinates: 27°05′52″N 57°02′20″E
- Country: Iran
- Province: Hormozgan
- County: Minab
- Bakhsh: Central
- Rural District: Band-e Zarak

Population (2006)
  - Total: 470
- Time zone: UTC+3:30 (IRST)
  - Summer (DST): UTC+4:30 (IRDT)

Roknabad (Persian: رکن‌آباد, also Romanized as Roknābād) is a village in Band-e Zarak Rural District, in the Central District of Minab County, Hormozgan Province, Iran. At the 2006 census, its population was 470, in 91 families.
