= Rumeshteh Mowmenabad =

Rumeshteh Mowmenabad رومشته مؤمن‌آباد
- village
- Location within Iran
- Coordinates: 33°51′34″N 48°05′14″E
- Country: Iran
- Province: Lorestan
- County: Selseleh
- Bakhsh: Firuzabad
- Rural District: Firuzabad

Population (2006)
  - Total: 174
- Time zone: UTC+3:30 (IRST)
  - Summer (DST): UTC+4:30 (IRDT)

Rumeshteh Mowmenabad (Persian: رومشته مؤمن‌آباد, also Romanized as Rūmeshteh Mow'menābād; also known as Mow'menābād) is a village in Firuzabad Rural District, Firuzabad District, Selseleh County, Lorestan province, Iran. At the 2006 census, its population was 174, in 30 families.
