= Mervi =

Surname list

Mervi is a given name. Notable people with the name include:

- Mervi Pohjanheimo (born 1945), Finnish television director and producer
- Mervi Väisänen (born 1973), Finnish ski-orienteering competitor

== See also ==
- Mervin (given name)
