= Posht Par, Mamasani =

Posht Par پشت پر
- Village
- Location within Iran
- Coordinates: 29°55′10″N 51°15′48″E
- Country: Iran
- Province: Fars
- County: Mamasani
- Bakhsh: Mahvarmilani
- Rural District: Mahur

Population (2006)
  - Total: 47
- Time zone: UTC+3:30 (IRST)
  - Summer (DST): UTC+4:30 (IRDT)

Posht Par (Persian: پشت پر, also Romanized as Poshtpar) is a village in Mahur Rural District, Mahvarmilani District, Mamasani County, Fars province, Iran. At the 2006 census, its population was 47, in 11 families.
