= Shurjeh-ye Emam Jomeh =

Shurjeh-ye Emam Jomeh شورجه امام جمعه
- Village
- Location within Iran
- Coordinates: 37°18′00″N 47°00′00″E
- Country: Iran
- Province: East Azerbaijan
- County: Charuymaq
- Bakhsh: Central
- Rural District: Varqeh

Population (2006)
  - Total: 132
- Time zone: UTC+3:30 (IRST)
  - Summer (DST): UTC+4:30 (IRDT)

Shurjeh-ye Emam Jomeh (Persian: شورجه امام جمعه, also Romanized as Shūrjeh-ye Emām Jom‘eh) is a village in Varqeh Rural District, in the Central District of Charuymaq County, East Azerbaijan Province, Iran. At the 2006 census, its population was 132, in 22 families.
