= Derakht-e Bid, Fariman =

Derakht-e Bid درخت بيد
- Village
- Location within Iran
- Coordinates: 35°33′24″N 59°49′43″E
- Country: Iran
- Province: Razavi Khorasan
- County: Fariman
- Bakhsh: Qalandarabad
- Rural District: Qalandarabad

Population (2006)
  - Total: 28
- Time zone: UTC+3:30 (IRST)
  - Summer (DST): UTC+4:30 (IRDT)

Derakht-e Bid (Persian: درخت بيد, also Romanized as Derakht-e Bīd) is a village in Qalandarabad Rural District, Qalandarabad District, Fariman County, Razavi Khorasan Province, Iran. At the 2006 census, its population was 28, in 6 families.
