= Qaleh Sang, Darab =

Qaleh Sang قلعه سنگ
- Village
- Location within Iran
- Coordinates: 28°37′26″N 55°12′46″E
- Country: Iran
- Province: Fars
- County: Darab
- Bakhsh: Rostaq
- Rural District: Kuhestan

Population (2006)
  - Total: 96
- Time zone: UTC+3:30 (IRST)
  - Summer (DST): UTC+4:30 (IRDT)

Qaleh Sang (Persian: قلعه سنگ, also Romanized as Qal‘eh Sang) is a village in Kuhestan Rural District, Rostaq District, Darab County, Fars province, Iran. At the 2006 census, its population was 96, in 24 families.
