= Mowmenabad, Delfan =

Mowmenabad مؤمن‌آباد
- village
- Location within Iran
- Coordinates: 34°11′48″N 47°43′20″E
- Country: Iran
- Province: Lorestan
- County: Delfan
- Bakhsh: Kakavand
- Rural District: Kakavand-e Sharqi

Population (2006)
  - Total: 78
- Time zone: UTC+3:30 (IRST)
  - Summer (DST): UTC+4:30 (IRDT)

Mowmenabad (Persian: مؤمن‌آباد, also Romanized as Mow'menābād) is a village in Kakavand-e Sharqi Rural District, Kakavand District, Delfan County, Lorestan Province, Iran. At the 2006 census, its population was 78, in 17 families.
