= Derakht-e Bid, Mashhad =

Derakht-e Bid درخت بيد
- Village
- Location within Iran
- Coordinates: 35°48′31″N 60°21′15″E
- Country: Iran
- Province: Razavi Khorasan
- County: Mashhad
- Bakhsh: Razaviyeh
- Rural District: Pain Velayat

Population (2006)
  - Total: 176
- Time zone: UTC+3:30 (IRST)
  - Summer (DST): UTC+4:30 (IRDT)

Derakht-e Bid (Persian: درخت بيد, also Romanized as Derakht-e Bīd) is a village in Pain Velayat Rural District, Razaviyeh District, Mashhad County, Razavi Khorasan Province, Iran. At the 2006 census, its population was 176, in 39 families.
