= Bidsukhteh, Kerman =

Bidsukhteh بيدسوخته
- Village
- Location within Iran
- Coordinates: 30°29′55″N 54°57′27″E
- Country: Iran
- Province: Kerman
- County: Shahr-e Babak
- Bakhsh: Dehaj
- Rural District: Jowzam

Population (2006)
  - Total: 52
- Time zone: UTC+3:30 (IRST)
  - Summer (DST): UTC+4:30 (IRDT)

Bidsukhteh (Persian: بيدسوخته, also Romanized as Bīdsūkhteh) is a village in Jowzam Rural District, Dehaj District, Shahr-e Babak County, Kerman Province, Iran. At the 2006 census, its population was 52, in 13 families.
