= Roknabad-ye Yek =

Roknabad-ye Yek رکن‌آباد ۱
- Village
- Location within Iran
- Coordinates: 29°52′09″N 56°07′42″E
- Country: Iran
- Province: Kerman
- County: Bardsir
- Bakhsh: Central
- Rural District: Kuh Panj

Population (2006)
  - Total: 12
- Time zone: UTC+3:30 (IRST)
  - Summer (DST): UTC+4:30 (IRDT)

Roknabad-ye Yek (Persian: رکن‌آباد ۱, also Romanized as Roknābād-e Yek; also known as Rokīnow and Roknābād) is a village in Kuh Panj Rural District, in the Central District of Bardsir County, Kerman Province, Iran. At the 2006 census, its population was 12, in 5 families.
