= Roknabad, Pasargad =

Roknabad رکن‌آباد
- Village
- Location within Iran
- Coordinates: 29°58′52″N 53°23′27″E
- Country: Iran
- Province: Fars
- County: Pasargad
- Bakhsh: Central
- Rural District: Sarpaniran

Population (2006)
  - Total: 290
- Time zone: UTC+3:30 (IRST)
  - Summer (DST): UTC+4:30 (IRDT)

Roknabad (Persian: رکن‌آباد, also Romanized as Roknābād) is a village in Sarpaniran Rural District, in the Central District of Pasargad County, Fars province, Iran. At the 2006 census, its population was 290, in 60 families.
