= Qaleh-ye Sangi, Chaharmahal and Bakhtiari =

Qaleh-ye Sangi قلعه سنگي
- Village
- Location within Iran
- Coordinates: 32°22′53″N 50°22′42″E
- Country: Iran
- Province: Chaharmahal and Bakhtiari
- County: Kuhrang
- Bakhsh: Central
- Rural District: Dasht-e Zarrin

Population (2006)
  - Total: 135
- Time zone: UTC+3:30 (IRST)
  - Summer (DST): UTC+4:30 (IRDT)

Qaleh-ye Sangi (Persian: قلعه سنگي, also Romanized as Qal‘eh-ye Sangī; also known as Qal‘eh Sang) is a village in Dasht-e Zarrin Rural District, in the Central District of Kuhrang County, Chaharmahal and Bakhtiari Province, Iran. At the 2006 census, its population was 135, in 25 families.
