= Sarvestan =

City in Fars province, Iran

Sarvestan Persian: سروستان
- City
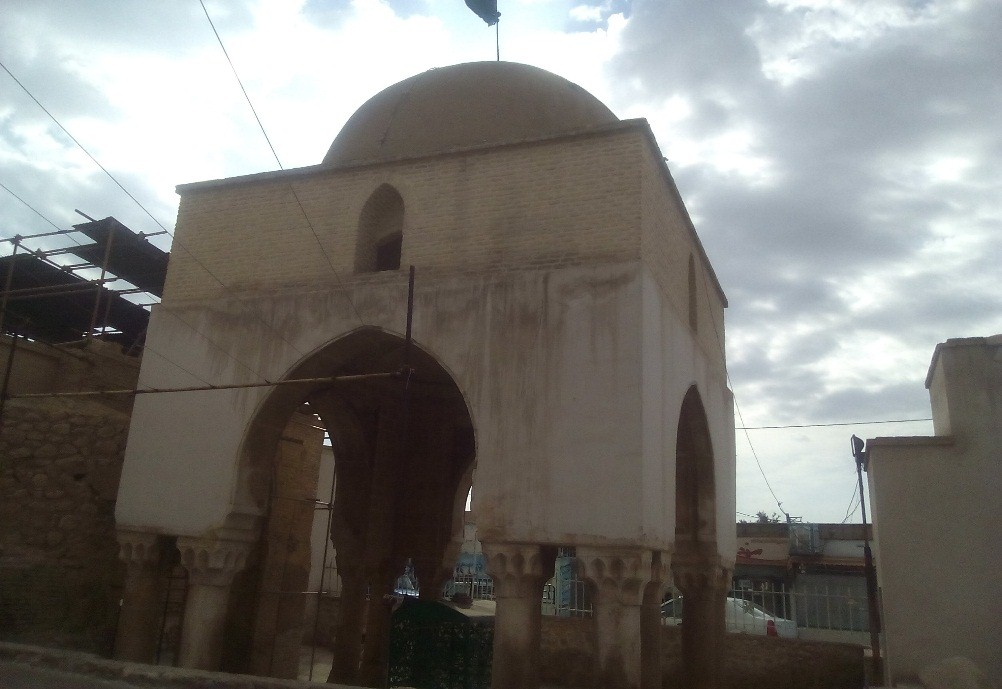
- Tomb of Sheikh Yoosof Sarvestani

- Location within Iran
- Coordinates: 29°16′26″N 53°13′13″E
- Country: Iran
- Province: Fars
- County: Sarvestan
- District: Central
- Elevation: 1,557 m (5,108 ft)

Population (2016)
  - Total: 18,187
- Time zone: UTC+3:30 (IRST)
- Area code: +98712522

Sarvestan (Persian: سروستان) (Note: Also romanized as Sarvestân and Sarvestān; also known as Sarvistān (sarv [cypress or cedar] + estan [land]: land of cedars)) is a city in the Central District of Sarvestan County, Fars province, Iran, serving as capital of both the county and the district.

The city is 80 kilometres (50 mi) southeast of Shiraz, the capital of Fars province.

Many tropical and sub-tropical plants are grown in Sarvestan such as wheat, pistachios, and olive. The yoghurt of Sarvestan is very famous.

== History ==
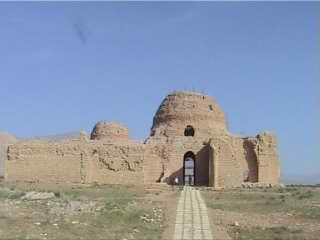
Sarvestan Palace

Sarvestan's history goes back some 2,600 years when the Achaemenids established the Persian Empire. The Sassanid monument of Sasanids' Palace (Kakhe Sasan) is located in south east of the city 90 km from Shiraz, experts believe the monument was constructed during the Sasanid dynastic era (224-651 A.D), and it was either a governing palace or a Zoroastrian temple, probably a fire temple. The monument was registered in Iran's National Heritage list in 1956, but the site in danger as the result of unprofessional restorations. Sarvestan is the birthplace of Sheikh Yusef Sarvestani, who was a moralist.

== Demographics ==
=== Ethnicity ===
The majority of people in Sarvestan are Persians.

=== Population ===
At the time of the 2006 national census, the city's population was 16,846 in 4,094 households, when it was capital of the former Sarvestan District of Shiraz County. The following census in 2011 counted 19,116 people in 4,898 households, by which time the district had been separated from the county in the establishment of Sarvestan County. The city and the rural district were transferred to the new Central District, with Sarvestan as the county's capital. The 2016 census measured the population of the city as 18,187 people in 5,592 households.

== Vegetation ==
Most of the county has gramineous vegetation including tree and shrub.

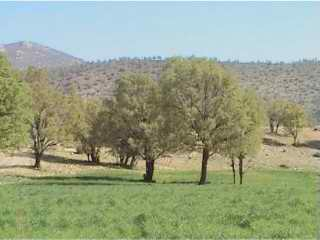

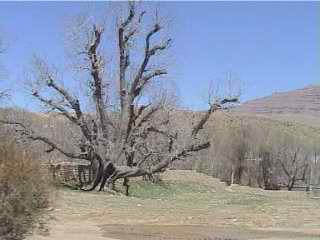

== Colleges and universities ==
Based on public census in 2006, about 76% of Sarvestanis are literate and 10.5% have academic educations. There are two major universities in the city:

1. Islamic Azad University of Sarvestan
2. Payame Noor University of Sarvestan
