= Maharlu Rural District =

Rural district in Fars province, Iran

Maharlu Rural District Persian: دهستان مهارلو
- Rural District
- Location within Iran
- Coordinates: 29°21′24″N 52°48′11″E
- Country: Iran
- Province: Fars
- County: Sarvestan
- District: Kuhenjan
- Capital: Maharlu Now

Population (2016)
  - Total: 5,265
- Time zone: UTC+3:30 (IRST)

Maharlu Rural District (Persian: دهستان مهارلو) is in Kuhenjan District of Sarvestan County, Fars province, Iran. Its capital is the village of Maharlu Now.

== Demographics ==
=== Population ===
At the time of the 2006 National Census, the rural district's population (as a part of the former Sarvestan District of Shiraz County) was 4,032 in 982 households. There were 5,736 inhabitants in 1,486 households at the following census of 2011, by which time the district had been separated from the county in the establishment of Sarvestan County. The rural district was transferred to the new Kuhenjan District. The 2016 census measured the population of the rural district as 5,265 in 1,587 households. The most populous of its nine villages was Maharlu Now, with 2,381 people.
