= Shuricheh Rural District =

Rural district in Fars province, Iran

Shuricheh Rural District Persian: دهستان شوریچه
- Rural District
- Location within Iran
- Coordinates: 29°08′18″N 53°12′59″E
- Country: Iran
- Province: Fars
- County: Sarvestan
- District: Central
- Capital: Shurjeh

Population (2016)
  - Total: 6,070
- Time zone: UTC+3:30 (IRST)

Shuricheh Rural District (Persian: دهستان شوریچه) is in the Central District of Sarvestan County, Fars province, Iran. Its capital is the village of Shurjeh.

== History ==
After the 2006 National Census, Sarvestan District was separated from Shiraz County in the establishment of Sarvestan County, and Shuricheh Rural District was created in the new Central District.

== Demographics ==
=== Population ===
At the time of the 2011 census, the rural district's population was 5,900 in 1,644 households. The 2016 census measured the population of the rural district as 6,070 in 1,838 households. The most populous of its 36 villages was Nazarabad, with 1,356 people.
