= Sarvestan District =

Former district in Fars province, Iran

Sarvestan District Persian: بخش سروستان
- Former District
- Location within Iran
- Coordinates: 29°16′N 53°04′E
- Country: Iran
- Province: Fars
- County: Shiraz
- Capital: Sarvestan

Population (2006)
  - Total: 34,452
- Time zone: UTC+3:30 (IRST)

Sarvestan District (Persian: بخش سروستان) is a former administrative division of Shiraz County, Fars province, Iran. Its capital was the city of Sarvestan.

== History ==
After the 2006 National Census, the district was separated from the county in the establishment of Sarvestan County.

== Demographics ==
=== Population ===
At the time of the 2006 census, the district's population was 34,452 in 8,308 households.

=== Administrative divisions ===
Sarvestan District Population
Administrative Divisions	2006
Kuhenjan RD	6,692
Maharlu RD	4,032
Sarvestan RD	6,882
Sarvestan (city)	16,846
Total	34,452
RD = Rural District
