= Kuhenjan Rural District =

Rural district in Fars province, Iran

Kuhenjan Rural District Persian: دهستان كوهنجان
- Rural District
- Location within Iran
- Coordinates: 29°18′50″N 52°58′25″E
- Country: Iran
- Province: Fars
- County: Sarvestan
- District: Kuhenjan
- Capital: Kuhenjan

Population (2016)
  - Total: 3,017
- Time zone: UTC+3:30 (IRST)

Kuhenjan Rural District (Persian: دهستان كوهنجان) is in Kuhenjan District of Sarvestan County, Fars province, Iran. It is administered from the city of Kuhenjan.

== Demographics ==
=== Population ===
At the time of the 2006 National Census, the rural district's population (as a part of the former Sarvestan District of Shiraz County) was 6,692 in 1,646 households. There were 3,385 inhabitants in 878 households at the following census of 2011, by which time the district had been separated from the county in the establishment of Sarvestan County. The rural district was transferred to the new Kuhenjan District. The 2016 census measured the population of the rural district as 3,017 in 900 households. The most populous of its 30 villages was Seyfabad, with 1,207 people.
