= Sarvestan Rural District (Sarvestan County) =

Rural district in Fars province, Iran

Sarvestan Rural District Persian: دهستان سروستان
- Rural District
- Location within Iran
- Coordinates: 29°17′47″N 53°11′59″E
- Country: Iran
- Province: Fars
- County: Sarvestan
- District: Central
- Capital: Kateh Gonbad

Population (2016)
  - Total: 2,289
- Time zone: UTC+3:30 (IRST)

Sarvestan Rural District (Persian: دهستان سروستان) is in the Central District of Sarvestan County, Fars province, Iran. Its capital is the village of Kateh Gonbad.

== Demographics ==
=== Population ===
At the time of the 2006 National Census, the rural district's population (as a part of the former Sarvestan District of Shiraz County) was 6,882 in 1,586 households. There were 2,422 inhabitants in 613 households at the following census of 2011, by which time the district had been separated from the county in the establishment of Sarvestan County. The rural district was transferred to the new Central District. The 2016 census measured the population of the rural district as 2,289 in 694 households. The most populous of its 31 villages was Kateh Gonbad, with 1,086 people.
