= Kuhenjan District =

District in Fars province, Iran

Kuhenjan District Persian: بخش كوهنجان
- District
- Location within Iran
- Coordinates: 29°18′50″N 52°55′58″E
- Country: Iran
- Province: Fars
- County: Sarvestan
- Capital: Kuhenjan

Population (2016)
  - Total: 11,563
- Time zone: UTC+3:30 (IRST)

Kuhenjan District (Persian: بخش كوهنجان) is in Sarvestan County, Fars province, Iran. Its capital is the city of Kuhenjan.

== History ==
After the 2006 National Census, Sarvestan District was separated from Shiraz County in the establishment of Sarvestan County, which was divided into two districts of two rural districts each, with the city of Sarvestan as its capital.

== Demographics ==
=== Population ===
At the time of the 2011 census, the district's population was 12,860 people in 3,400 households. The 2016 census measured the population of the district as 11,563 inhabitants in 3,528 households.

=== Administrative divisions ===
Kuhenjan District Population
Administrative Divisions	2011	2016
Kuhenjan RD	3,385	3,017
Maharlu RD	5,736	5,265
Kuhenjan (city)	3,739	3,281
Total	12,860	11,563
RD = Rural District
