= Central District (Sarvestan County) =

District in Fars province, Iran

Central District (Sarvestan County) Persian: بخش مرکزی شهرستان سروستان
- District
- Location within Iran
- Coordinates: 29°11′46″N 53°12′59″E
- Country: Iran
- Province: Fars
- County: Sarvestan
- Capital: Sarvestan

Population (2016)
  - Total: 26,546
- Time zone: UTC+3:30 (IRST)

The Central District of Sarvestan County (Persian: بخش مرکزی شهرستان سروستان) is in Fars province, Iran. Its capital is the city of Sarvestan.

== History ==
After the 2006 National Census, Sarvestan District was separated from Shiraz County in the establishment of Sarvestan County, which was divided into two districts of two rural districts each, with Sarvestan as its capital.

== Demographics ==
=== Population ===
At the time of the 2011 census, the district's population was 27,438 people in 7,155 households. The 2016 census measured the population of the district as 26,546 inhabitants in 8,124 households.

=== Administrative divisions ===
Central District (Sarvestan County) Population
Administrative Divisions	2011	2016
Sarvestan RD	2,422	2,289
Shuricheh RD	5,900	6,070
Sarvestan (city)	19,116	18,187
Total	27,438	26,546
RD = Rural District
