= Sarvestan County =

County in Fars province, Iran

Sarvestan County Persian: شهرستان سروستان
- County
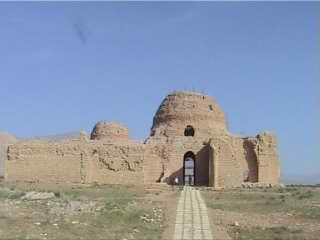
- Sarvestan Palace

- Location of Sarvestan County in Fars province (center, purple)

- Location of Fars province in Iran
- Coordinates: 29°16′N 53°04′E
- Country: Iran
- Province: Fars
- Capital: Sarvestan
- Districts: Central, Kuhenjan

Population (2016)
  - Total: 38,114
- Time zone: UTC+3:30 (IRST)

Sarvestan County (Persian: شهرستان سروستان) is in Fars province, Iran. Its capital is the city of Sarvestan.

== History ==
After the 2006 National Census, Sarvestan District was separated from Shiraz County in the establishment of Sarvestan County, which was divided into two districts of two rural districts each, with Sarvestan as its capital.

== Demographics ==
=== Population ===
At the time of the 2011 census, the county's population was 40,531 people in 10,579 households. The 2016 census measured the population of the county as 38,114 in 11,653 households.

=== Administrative divisions ===
Sarvestan County's population history and administrative structure over two consecutive censuses are shown in the following table.

Sarvestan County Population
Administrative Divisions	2011	2016
Central District	27,438	26,546
Sarvestan RD	2,422	2,289
Shuricheh RD	5,900	6,070
Sarvestan (city)	19,116	18,187
Kuhenjan District	12,860	11,563
Kuhenjan RD	3,385	3,017
Maharlu RD	5,736	5,265
Kuhenjan (city)	3,739	3,281
Total	40,531	38,114
RD = Rural District

== See also ==
Media related to Sarvestan County at Wikimedia Commons
