= Sarakhs County =

County in Razavi Khorasan province, Iran

Sarakhs County Persian: شهرستان سرخس
- County
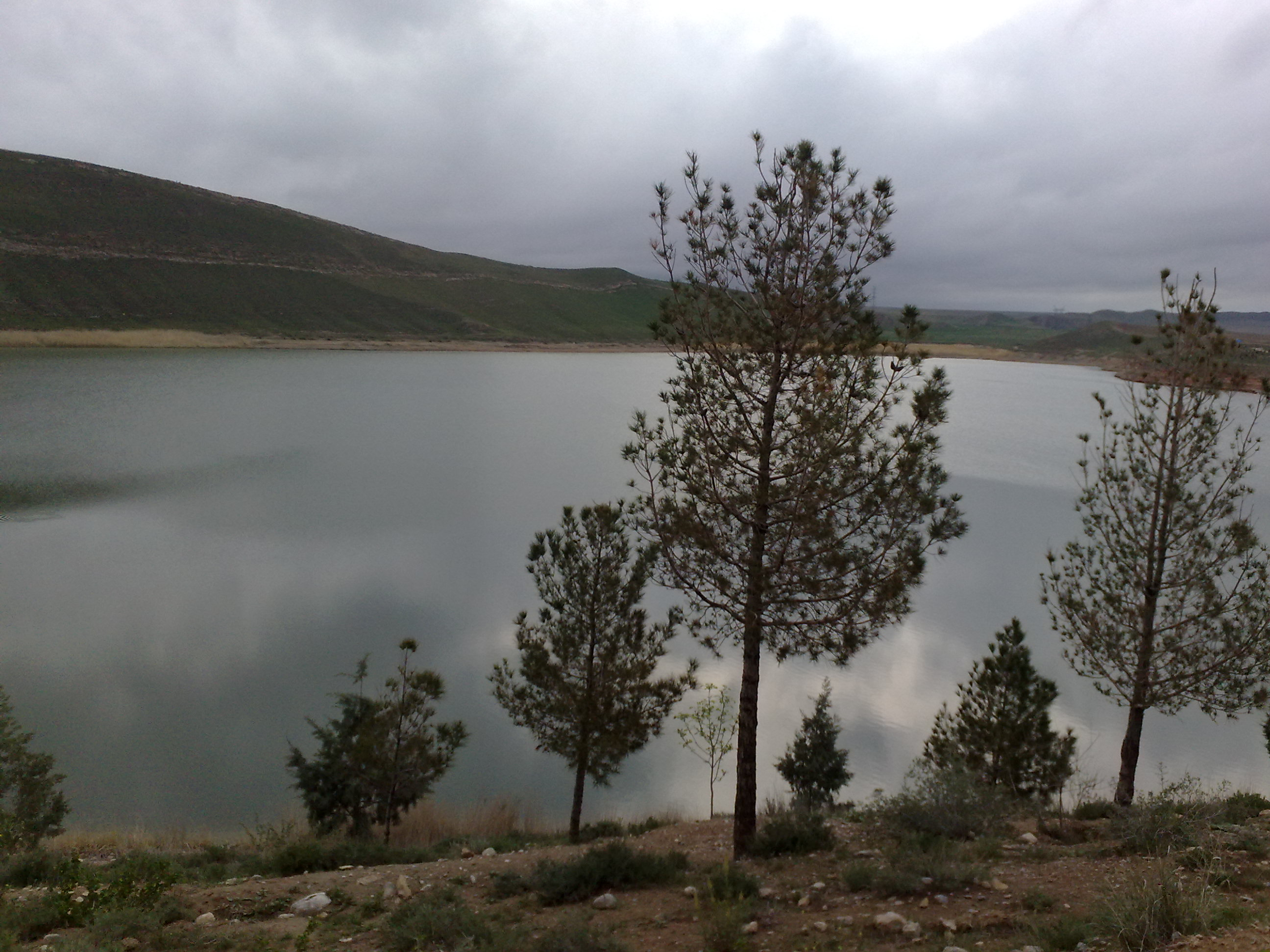
- Bazangan Lake

- Location of Sarakhs County in Razavi Khorasan province (top right, yellow)

- Location of Razavi Khorasan province in Iran
- Coordinates: 36°17′N 60°43′E
- Country: Iran
- Province: Razavi Khorasan
- Capital: Sarakhs
- Districts: Central, Marzdaran

Area
  - Total: 5,397 km^{2} (2,084 sq mi)

Population (2016)
  - Total: 97,519
  - Density: 18.07/km^{2} (46.80/sq mi)
- Time zone: UTC+3:30 (IRST)

Sarakhs County (Persian: شهرستان سرخس) is in Razavi Khorasan province, Iran. Its capital is the city of Sarakhs.

== Demographics ==
=== Population ===
At the time of the 2006 National Census, the county's population was 85,524 in 19,485 households. The following census in 2011 counted 89,956 people in 23,438 households. The 2016 census measured the population of the county as 97,519 in 26,932 households.

=== Administrative divisions ===
Sarakhs County's population history and administrative structure over three consecutive censuses are shown in the following table.

Sarakhs County Population
Administrative Divisions	2006	2011	2016
Central District	69,404	74,796	80,710
Khangiran RD	6,530	6,829	7,600
Sarakhs RD	16,167	17,366	17,734
Tajan RD	13,136	13,439	13,197
Sarakhs (city)	33,571	37,162	42,179
Marzdaran District	16,120	15,160	16,808
Golbibi RD	6,278	5,753	6,121
Marzdaran RD	2,993	2,882	2,914
Pol Khatun RD	5,821	4,966	6,532
Mazdavand (city)	1,028	1,559	1,241
Total	85,524	89,956	97,519
RD = Rural District

== See also ==
Media related to Sarakhs County at Wikimedia Commons
