= Marzdaran District =

District in Razavi Khorasan province, Iran

Marzdaran District Persian: بخش مرزداران
- District
- Location within Iran
- Coordinates: 36°11′N 60°41′E
- Country: Iran
- Province: Razavi Khorasan
- County: Sarakhs
- Capital: Mazdavand

Population (2016)
  - Total: 16,808
- Time zone: UTC+3:30 (IRST)

Marzdaran District (Persian: بخش مرزداران) is in Sarakhs County, Razavi Khorasan province, Iran. Its capital is the city of Mazdavand.

== Demographics ==
=== Population ===
At the time of the 2006 National Census, the district's population was 16,120 in 3,618 households. The following census in 2011 counted 15,160 people in 3,868 households. The 2016 census measured the population of the district as 16,808 inhabitants in 4,766 households.

=== Administrative divisions ===
Marzdaran District Population
Administrative Divisions	2006	2011	2016
Golbibi RD	6,278	5,753	6,121
Marzdaran RD	2,993	2,882	2,914
Pol Khatun RD	5,821	4,966	6,532
Mazdavand (city)	1,028	1,559	1,241
Total	16,120	15,160	16,808
RD = Rural District
