= Qush =

Qush (Persian: قوش) may refer to:

- Qush, West Azerbaijan
- Qush-e Alijan
- Qush-e Azim
- Qush-e Chaker
- Qush-e Khazai
- Qush-e Kohneh
- Qush-e Sarbuzi
- Qush, alternate name of Gush Laghar

== See also ==
- Kush (disambiguation)
- Qush Khaneh
- Qush Tappeh (disambiguation)
