= Khorasani Baloch =

Baloch living in the Khorasan region of Iran

Regions with significant populations
- mainly Razavi Khorasan, but also South Khorasan, and Golestan province

Languages
- Balochi, Persian

Religion
- Sunni ، Shia

The Baloch of Khorasan (Balochi: خراسانءِ بلۏچ) are a group of Baloch people who settled in Khorasan. This group migrated from Balochistan to Khorasan and settled mainly in Birjand, Sabzevar, Quchan, Neishabur, Sarakhs and other cities of Khorasan.

== History ==
Settlement of Baloch to Khorasan were initiated by Nader Shah and some baloch clans moved to Khorasan during the reign of afsharid dynasty.

== Language ==
The language of the Baloch of Khorasan is Balochi of the Rakhshani dialect.

== Culture ==
A distinct group of carpets woven by the Baloch tribes in Khorasan region in Iran are known as Baloch carpets.

== Villages ==
In South Khorasan, the Baloch live as nomads and in the cities of South Khorasan as a group. In Birjand, Qaen, Nahbandan and Torbat Jam, there are Baloch-inhabited areas that live densely with other ethnic groups.

- Kalateh-ye Morrehi
- Zu ol Farrokh
- Baluch Khaneh
- Asefabad, Razavi Khorasan
- Qush-e Azim
- Qarah Qeytan
- Jahand-e Pa'in Razavi Khorasan

== See also ==
- Baloch diaspora
- Baloch people
