= Eslam Qaleh =

Eslam Qaleh (Persian: اسلام قلعه) may refer to:

- Eslam Qaleh, Mashhad, Iran
- Eslam Qaleh, Sarakhs, Iran
- Islam Qala, a town in Herat Province, Afghanistan
