= Latifabad, Razavi Khorasan =

Village in Razavi Khorasan province, Iran

Latifabad Persian: لطيف اباد
- Village
- Location within Iran
- Coordinates: 36°28′19″N 61°08′54″E
- Country: Iran
- Province: Razavi Khorasan
- County: Sarakhs
- District: Central
- Rural District: Sarakhs

Population (2016)
  - Total: 107
- Time zone: UTC+3:30 (IRST)

Latifabad (Persian: لطيف اباد) (Note: Also romanized as Laṭīfābād; also known as Qal‘eh Now (قلعه نو)) is a village in Sarakhs Rural District of the Central District in Sarakhs County, Razavi Khorasan province, Iran.

== Demographics ==
=== Population ===
At the time of the 2006 National Census, the village's population was 93 in 18 households. The following census in 2011 counted 112 people in 28 households. The 2016 census measured the population of the village as 107 people in 27 households.
