= Armenian–Kurdish relations =

Diplomatic relations between Armenian and Kurdish peoples

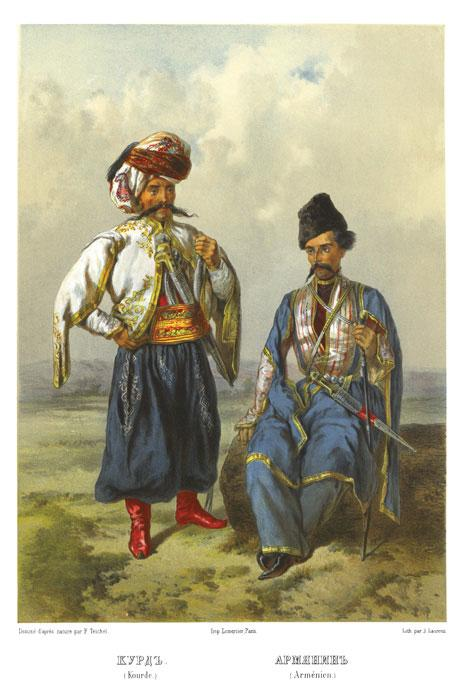
Kurdish and Armenian traditional clothes, 1862

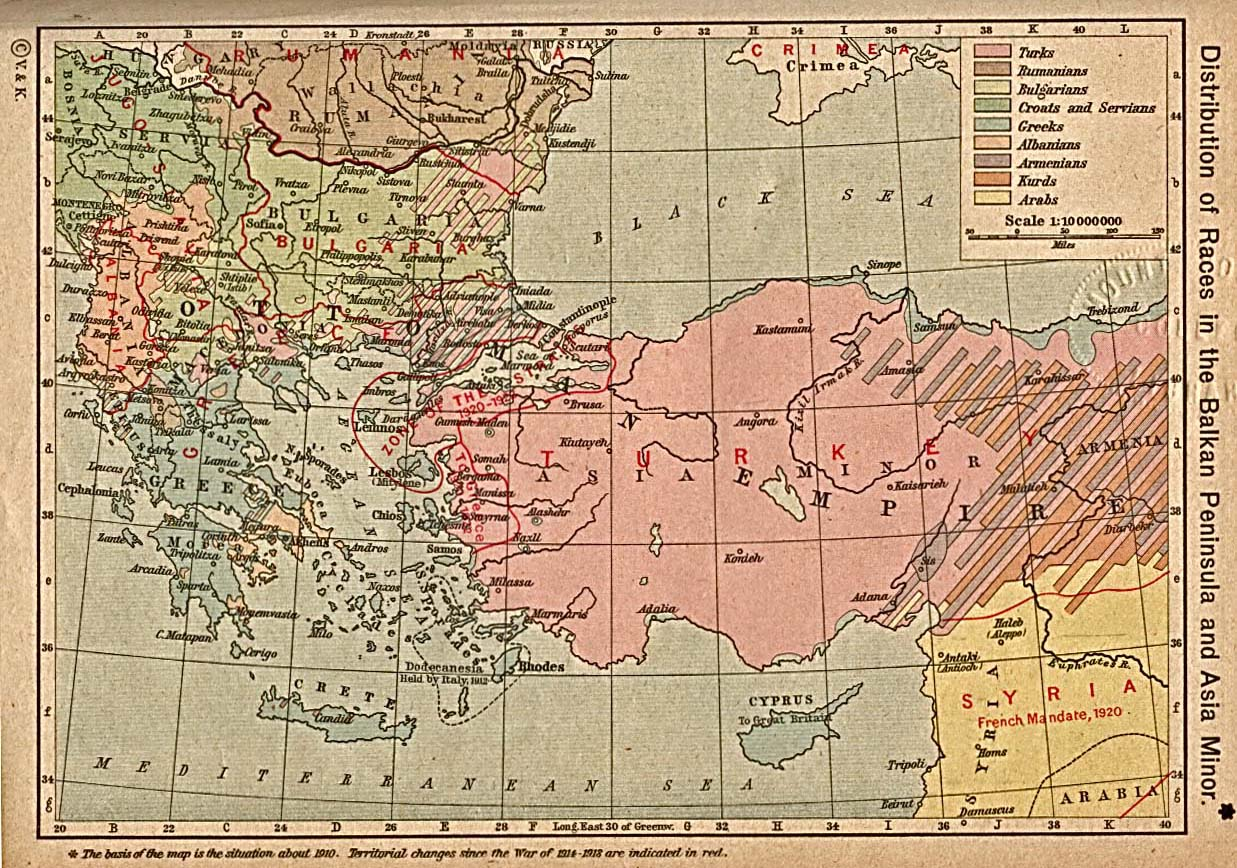
Distribution of ethnic groups in the Balkan Peninsula and Asia Minor in 1923, Historical Atlas by William R. Shepherd, New York (The map does not reflect the results of the 1923 population transfer between Greece and Turkey)

Armenian–Kurdish relations covers the historical relations between the Kurds and the Armenians.

== Kurds under Ancient Armenia ==
Ancient Corduene, which partially corresponds geographically to present-day Kurdistan, was twice incorporated into the Kingdom of Armenia. The first period was in the first century as a vassal kingdom of Armenia. Corduene was then incorporated in the Roman Republic and remained in Roman hands for more than four centuries. In the late fourth century AD, it became a part of Armenia for the second time in 384 and remained as such until 428 AD. Its area was much smaller than what is now called Kurdistan and was mainly concentrated in the south of Lake Van and around Diyarbakir.

Armenians referred to the inhabitants of Corduene as Korduk'. The name found its way into Greek documents and Xenophon used the Hellenized form of the name, Karduchoi (Kαρδoύχoι). According to Strabo, the region of Corduene (Γορδυηνή, also Γoρδυαία όρη "Gordyaean Mts.") referred to the mountains between Diyarbakir and Mush. The term "Karduchoi" is a Greek term and derives from the words "kard-" (καρδιά = heart) and "-uchoi" (-ούχοι = owners). It symbolizes the heart that they had to face their enemies. According to some historical records and modern scholars, despite the similarity in names, the Karduchoi were not Kurds.

Besides Corduene, the Kingdom of Armenia also governed Moxoene (Miks in Kurdish), located around present-day Bahçesaray, which today is inhabited heavily by Kurds.

== Ottoman Empire ==
Kurdish attacks against the Armenians residing in Ottoman controlled Western Armenia had preceded the 19th century, the Kurds sustained their nomadic lifestyle through raids against the indigenous rural Armenians. According to historian Roland, There were many factors in the Kurdish persecution of Armenians; racism (economic and ethnic), individual monetary gain, and religious intolerance, the intensity of these factors increased over time as the Ottoman Sultan continued endorsing the Kurdish persecution of Armenians. The tribal nature of the Kurdish people makes it very difficult to assess the motives of individual clans, though what is certain is the loyalty of Kurdish tribes to the Ottoman Caliphate, to the point where Kurdish chiefs who had sympathized for the Armenian cause were disenfranchised by fellow aghas.

=== Sheikh Ubeydullah rebellion (1880) ===
After the Russo-Turkish War of 1877–78, Sheikh Ubeydullah began his rebellion in 1880 to create an independent Kurdistan, fearing that Armenians – with European support – would carve out an independent Armenia which would include Kurdish-populated areas. Sheikh Ubeydullah opposed both Armenian and Assyrian self determination stating that he would go as far as arming women to prevent it from manifesting. Despite tensions with the Armenians, Sheikh Ubeydullah ordered his men to not harm Armenians when they commenced their invasion of Iran in September 1880. To insure this, he issued a fatwa which strictly ordered the rebels to not harm any Armenian. Moreover, the Sheikh was aware of the fact that the Sublime Porte wished to use his rebellion as an excuse to massacre the Armenian and Nestorian population in the region. Regarding this, he held a speech in Şemdinli in 1880, wherein he stated: "If until now the Sublime Porte has supported the Kurds in every way, it is done because of the desire to counter its Christian elements in Anatolia; and if the Armenians are eliminated here, the Kurds will lose their importance for the Turkish government." In a letter to the Kurdish Sheikh of Eleşkirt, Sheikh Ubeydullah also stated that he liked the Armenians much more than the Persians and the Turks. In spite of being a failure, the uprising generated sympathy among the Armenian population and Grigor Artsruni reacted by stating that: "The Armenian, Assyrian and Kurdish populations of Armenia finally are beginning to understand that they are all inhabitants of Armenia, with the same interests, that the oppression of Turkey equally troubles them all." Moreover, Kurdish schools were opened by Armenians in the mixed towns of Muş, Bitlis, Kiğı and Eleşkirt. There were also attempts to open Armenian schools in Kurdish-populated areas. The reason for this move was the belief among Armenian intellectuals that the Kurds should be wooed to prevent the Kurds from uniting with the Ottoman Empire. The Social Democrat Hunchakian Party and the Armenian Revolutionary Federation also called for cooperation with the Kurds.

=== Patnos-Karakilise Incident (1890) ===
In 1890, 2,000 Kurdish forces under the leadership of Hussein Pasha launched a campaign of oppression against Armenians in Patnos and Karakilise (present-day Ağrı Province). They carried out acts of rape, harassment, looting, theft, and arson against the Armenian population. Even local Muslims opposed these actions

=== Hamidian period (1891–1894) ===
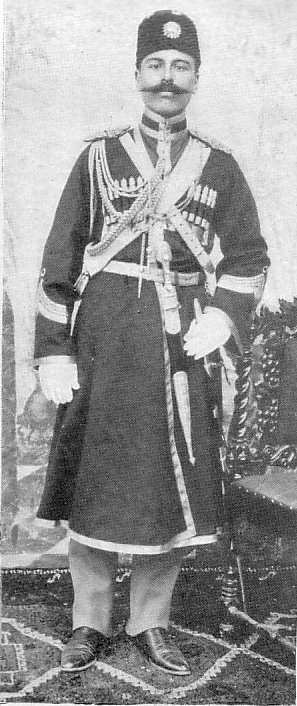
Hamidieh soldier,major.

In 1891, the activity of the Armenian Committees induced the Ottoman Porte to strengthen the position of the Kurds by raising a body of irregular cavalry, which was well-armed and called Hamidieh, after the Sultan Abdul Hamid II. Some Kurdish tribal leaders were given high positions. The system of double taxation sparked newfound enmity between Kurdish chieftains (aga) and the Armenians and Assyrian agrarian community who perceived Kurdish taxation as exploitation. When the Armenians decided to challenge extortion, a fight ensued and a Kurd was killed. Using the Kurd's death as a pretext by describing that a revolt had taken place, Turkish officials endorsed a Kurdish revenge attack against the Armenians of Sason.

At the turn of the 20th century, most Armenians were peasants, who were exploited and oppressed by their Kurdish feudal beys. According to the Russian vice-consul Tumanskii, Armenian peasants were treated as serfs attached to Kurdish chiefs. They were sold as property, and if Kurd killed a serf, the latter's master took revenge by killing a serf belonging to the murderer.

Fearing Armenian-Kurdish cooperation, the Ottoman Empire was induced to subordinate the Kurds and use them as an instrument to prevent any Armenian attempt to self-rule. While the forced recruitment to the Hamidiye cavalry pushed many Kurds to rebel (notably the Kurds of Murat river), some tribes like the Mazrik tribe chose to take part in the cavalry. Russian consul Ivanov explained in his writings that the Turks oppressed the Kurds who did not join the cavalry by provoking tribal feuds or attacking them when they descended from the mountains to the summer mountain camps during winter.

==== Sasun Resistance, 1894 ====
In 1894, the ARF participated in the First Sasun Resistance, supplying arms to the local population to help the people of Sasun defend themselves against the Hamidian purges. Thousands of Armenians were killed by Ottoman troops and Kurdish tribesmen when the Armenians began their struggle for autonomy in 1894. In the summer of 1894, armed Armenian peasants resisted an attack by the Kurds. Then, "Hamidieh" regiments and regular troops from Bitlis and Muş Province, joined by the Fourth Army Corps, were sent to the Armenian regions around Sasun and began a 23-day operation, from August 18 to September 10. The troops massacred at least 8,000 Armenians.

==== Defense of Van, 1896 ====
In June 1896, the Defense of Van in the province of Van was organised while "Hamidieh" regiments were about to attack the city. All ablebodied Armenian men of Van rose with weapons and protected the civilians from attack and subsequent massacre.

==== Chieftain of Zelian, 1896 ====
The Kurdish chieftain of Zelian, with his army of 3,000 to 4,000 Kurds, launched an attack on the Armenian villages. The Ottoman governor reported to the Sultan that the Sheikh of Zeilan was being attacked by the Armenians.

Minor disturbances constantly occurred, and were soon followed by the massacre of Armenians at other places in 1894–1896, and Kurds took an active part. They led to the devastation of five Armenian villages and the region of Talori (Dalvorikh). The events at Sason were the beginning of a long series of Armenian demonstrations and their suppression by the Kurds.

==== Khanasor Expedition, 1897 ====
The Khanasor Expedition was undertaken against the Kurdish Mazrik tribe on July 25, 1897. The Armenian Revolutionary Federation had decided to retaliate, after the Ottoman-hired Mazrik tribe had ambushed and slaughtered a squad of Armenian defenders during the 1896 Defense of Van.

== World War I ==
The Russian vice consul of the Republic of Van made note of living conditions of the Armenians in Ottoman controlled regions of Western Armenia:

There exists an almost feudal dependence of Armenians on the Kurds with all its juridical consequences: each Armenian is assigned to some Kurd and is obligated to labor for him; Kurds sell their serfs when they need money; if a Kurd kills a serf, the lord [of that serf] takes revenge by killing a serf belonging to the murderer. Some beys have even insisted on the "right of the first night" in Armenian villages.

In December 1914, Russian forces briefly penetrated beyond Doğubayazıt to Alashkert, They garrisoned the area with Armenian troops, by the time they left, only one tenth of the largely Kurdish population of the area had survived.

The Alevi community of Dersim, some who were Kurds and Zazas, had been financed by European officials to help Armenians flee to the Russian border.

== Turkish War of Independence ==
In the aftermath of the defeat of the Ottoman Empire in World War I, the Entente Powers proposed to divide up its Anatolian lands in the Treaty of Sèvres. Among other things, the full application of the treaty would have led to the expansion of the Democratic Republic of Armenia to include regions such as Bitlis, Van, Erzurum and Trabzon while granting local autonomy to the Kurdish inhabited areas east of the Euphrates river and to the south of Armenia. Sharif Pasha, the Kurdish representative in the Paris Peace Conference, reached an agreement with the Armenian representatives on December 20, 1919, and both parties made joint declarations to the conference.

However, Turkish revolutionaries led by Mustafa Kemal Atatürk rejected the treaty as "unacceptable" and fought for total control of all of Anatolia in the Turkish War of Independence. The Sèvres treaty was then succeeded and replaced by the Treaty of Lausanne which established, roughly, the present-day borders of the Republic of Turkey (except Hatay). The Lausanne treaty not only dashed any hope of an independent Kurdish state but also did not confer upon the Kurdish people the minority status (and its entailed rights) given to Greeks, Armenians and Jews.

Kurds and Turks were united in the aftermath of World War I against the non-Muslims victors and local Armenian Christians, and Islam was the unifying factor. When due to Atatürk reforms Islam became disentangled from the state, Atatürk undermined the foundations of Turkish-Kurdish unity.

=== Republic of Ararat ===
A series of Kurdish rebellions against Turkey throughout the 1920s culminated in the temporary establishment of the Republic of Ararat in 1927, located in the province of Ağrı, near the border of Soviet Armenia. Without recognition or foreign backing, however, the state ended up being defeated by the Turkish government who resumed control over the region. The Ararat movement was led by Xoybûn, a Kurdish political party which held its founding congress in August 1927 in Bihamdun, Lebanon. An Armenian Dashnak leader, Vahan Papazyan, attended the meeting "as a symbol of the alliance between Armenians and Kurds."

=== PKK ===
More Kurdish rebellions would occur throughout the region. The most violent were those by the Kurdistan Workers Party (or the PKK) that was founded in 1978. The war between the PKK and the Turkish government, which spanned the 1980s through the 1990s, caused numerous deaths and internally displaced persons on the Kurdish side.

During the Turkey-PKK war, a photograph showing PKK leader Abdullah Öcalan with M. Yohanna, the Syriac Orthodox bishop of Aleppo, was used by two Turkish newspapers Tercüman and Sabah in 1994 to try to prove that Turkey's Armenian community and church were openly supporting and collaborating with the PKK. In May 1994, the newspaper Özgür Ülke (Free Country; the successor of the pro-Kurdish publication Özgür Gündem) released the correct information regarding the photograph and stated that it was taken during an open March 1993 meeting between Yohanna and the PKK, which was covered by the Kurdish news agency Kurdha and the magazine Özgür Halk (Free People). They said that it was found by Turkish security forces during a search in the rooms of the agency Özgür Gündem. The Turkish media also claimed that Armenia was hosting PKK training camps, but the allegations were proven to be untrue.

Some Kurds in a struggle against Turkey began to identify themselves with the Armenians, the very people whom they were encouraged by the Ottoman government to oppress. Today, Turks of Armenian and Kurdish ethnicity coexist in peace. The PKK leadership has recognized the Armenian genocide and apologized for Kurdish involvement. There have also been seminars held by Armenian and Kurdish groups to discuss both the genocide and Turkey.

=== PKK–ASALA ===
The Armenian Secret Army for the Liberation of Armenia (ASALA) was a Marxist–Leninist organization whose primary objective was "to compel the Turkish Government to acknowledge publicly its alleged responsibility for the deaths of 1.5 million Armenians in 1915, pay reparations, and cede territory for an Armenian homeland". PKK and ASALA held a press conference on April 8, 1980, in Sidon which declared their cooperation, that resulted with the Strasbourg, November 9, 1980, and Rome, November 19, 1980, activities of ASALA and PKK cooperation. The Armenian guerilla fighter and ASALA member Monte Melkonian considered in his writings Armenian self-determination as a national minority within a revolutionary Kurdish state. However, after July 1983, ASALA disappeared in the Lebanese Beqaa Valley where the PKK established its camps.

== Kurds in Armenia ==
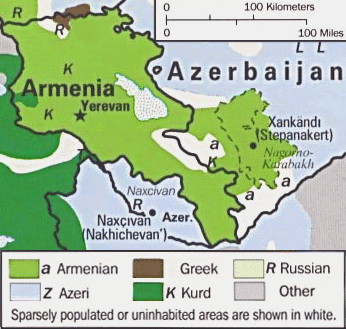
Armenia's Kurdish population (dark green).

During the period of Stalinist ethnic cleansing in 1937, the Kurds of Armenia became victims of forced migrations.

=== Soviet era ===
Kurdish culture flourished in Soviet Armenia between the 1930s and 1980s, and Kurds enjoyed substantial state-sponsored cultural support. There was a Kurdish radio broadcast from Yerevan. The pioneers of modern Kurdish literature and culture were mainly Yazidis who were immigrants from Turkey. The famous Kurdish writers in this period include Casimê Celîl, Emînê Evdal, Kurdoev, Arab Shamilov and Jalile Jalil. The renowned Kurdish newspaper Riya Teze, published in Yerevan, is among the oldest Kurdish newspapers. It is the organ of the Kurdish section of the Communist Party of Armenia. Many Armenian literary works were translated into Kurdish by translators such as C. Celîl, H. Cindî, E. Evdal, Q. Murad, N. Esed and T. Murad. The first Kurdish novel was written by Shamilov in 1935.

=== Kurdish departments in Armenia ===
In 1969, the Armenian Academy of Sciences founded a Kurdish Studies Department to document and to research all aspects of Kurdish culture but also to study Armenian and Kurdish relations. One of the first Kurdish newspapers was actually established and published in the capital of Armenia, Yerevan. The newspaper was called Riya Teze (Kurdish: The new road). Later on, another Kurdish newspaper was founded called Botan that was published once every two weeks.

Armenian radio station Denge Erivan (The Voice of Yerevan) broadcast in Kurdish for one hour a day, drawing an audience of ethnic Kurds from southeast Turkey. One author writes that he had a childhood friend who was taunted in school for listening to it in the sixties.

=== Armenia's Yazidi Kurdish minority ===
According to the 2001 Census, there are about 40,620 Yazidis in Armenia. According to a 2007 U.S. Department of State human rights report, "As in previous years, Yezidi leaders did not complain that police and local authorities subjected their community to discrimination". A high percentage of Yezidi children do not attend school, both due to poverty and a lack of teachers who speak their native language. However, the first-ever Yezidi school opened in Armenia in 1920. Due to the ethnic tension created by the war with Azerbaijan, the Yazidi community has renounced its ties with the mostly Muslim Kurds that fled the country and tried to establish itself as a distinct ethnic group. The Yezidis showed great patriotism fighting together with Armenians during the First Nagorno-Karabakh War and many died in service.

On 30 September 2019, the world's largest Yazidi temple has been opened in Aknalich village in Armenia.

== See also ==
- Armenian–Jewish relations
- Baloch–Kurdish relations
