= Chaleh Zard =

Village in Razavi Khorasan province, Iran

Chaleh Zard Persian: چاله زرد
- Village
- Location within Iran
- Coordinates: 36°11′10″N 60°55′27″E
- Country: Iran
- Province: Razavi Khorasan
- County: Sarakhs
- District: Central
- Rural District: Khangiran

Population (2016)
  - Total: 919
- Time zone: UTC+3:30 (IRST)

Chaleh Zard (Persian: چاله زرد) (Note: Also romanized as Chāleh Zard) is a village in Khangiran Rural District of the Central District in Sarakhs County, Razavi Khorasan province, Iran.

== Demographics ==
=== Population ===
At the time of the 2006 National Census, the village's population was 981 in 194 households. The following census in 2011 counted 809 people in 208 households. The 2016 census measured the population of the village as 919 people in 230 households.
