= Kachuli =

Village in Razavi Khorasan province, Iran

Kachuli Persian: كچولي
- Village
- Location within Iran
- Coordinates: 36°25′55″N 61°06′08″E
- Country: Iran
- Province: Razavi Khorasan
- County: Sarakhs
- District: Central
- Rural District: Tajan

Population (2016)
  - Total: 2,468
- Time zone: UTC+3:30 (IRST)

Kachuli (Persian: كچولي) (Note: Also romanized as Kachūlī; also known as ‘Abbās Qolīkhān and Kajūlī) is a village in Tajan Rural District of the Central District in Sarakhs County, Razavi Khorasan province, Iran.

== Demographics ==
=== Population ===
At the time of the 2006 National Census, the village's population was 2,284 in 539 households. The following census in 2011 counted 2,436 people in 663 households. The 2016 census measured the population of the village as 2,468 people in 703 households.
