= Samadabad, Razavi Khorasan =

Village in Razavi Khorasan province, Iran

Samadabad Persian: صمداباد
- Village
- Location within Iran
- Coordinates: 36°12′21″N 61°08′40″E
- Country: Iran
- Province: Razavi Khorasan
- County: Sarakhs
- District: Central
- Rural District: Tajan

Population (2016)
  - Total: 608
- Time zone: UTC+3:30 (IRST)

Samadabad (Persian: صمداباد( (Note: Also romanized as Şamadābād; also known as Kalāteh-ye Māmkhān (كلاته مام خان)) is a village in Tajan Rural District of the Central District in Sarakhs County, Razavi Khorasan province, Iran.

== Demographics ==
=== Population ===
At the time of the 2006 National Census, the village's population was 616 in 117 households. The following census in 2011 counted 687 people in 153 households. The 2016 census measured the population of the village as 608 people in 162 households.
