= Jahand-e Pa'in Razavi Khorasan =

Jahand-e Pa'in جهند پایین
- Village
- Location within Iran
- Coordinates: 36°10′38″N 61°12′43″E
- Country: Iran
- Province: Razavi Khorasan
- County: Sarakhs
- Bakhsh: Marzdaran

Population
  - Total: 817
- Time zone: UTC+3:30 (IRST)
  - Summer (DST): UTC+4:30 (IRDT)

Sarakhs city

Jahand-e Pa'in is one of the villages in the central part of Sarakhs city, which is located in the south of Sarakhs city and on the west bank of Tajan River. It is at the following coordinates: 36°10'38" N and 61°12'43" E.

== History ==
It was founded after Shahrivar 1320 AH by a person named "Jahand". The inhabitants of this Kalateh are mostly from the Baluchi and Brahui tribes.

== Economy ==
The occupation of the people of this village is agriculture and animal husbandry. Due to the lack of suitable agricultural and development facilities in the northern part of Sarakhs city and the migration of people to those areas, it will cause evacuation of people's village and as a result, the destruction of this village in the future.
