= Yas Tappeh =

Village in Razavi Khorasan province, Iran

Yas Tappeh Persian: ياس تپه
- Village
- Location within Iran
- Coordinates: 36°36′20″N 61°01′55″E
- Country: Iran
- Province: Razavi Khorasan
- County: Sarakhs
- District: Central
- Rural District: Sarakhs

Population (2016)
  - Total: 2,517
- Time zone: UTC+3:30 (IRST)

Yas Tappeh (Persian: ياس تپه) (Note: Also romanized as Yās Tappeh; also known as Yāz Tappeh and Yāz-Toppeh) is a village in Sarakhs Rural District of the Central District in Sarakhs County, Razavi Khorasan province, Iran.

== Demographics ==
=== Population ===
At the time of the 2006 National Census, the village's population was 2,189 in 471 households. The following census in 2011 counted 2,452 people in 604 households. The 2016 census measured the population of the village as 2,517 people in 682 households.
