= Kandakli =

Village in Razavi Khorasan province, Iran

Kandakli Persian: كندكلي
- Village
- Location within Iran
- Coordinates: 36°34′21″N 61°03′18″E
- Country: Iran
- Province: Razavi Khorasan
- County: Sarakhs
- District: Central
- Rural District: Sarakhs

Population (2016)
  - Total: 1,518
- Time zone: UTC+3:30 (IRST)

Kandakli (Persian: كندكلي) (Note: Also romanized as Kandaklī and Kandkali; also known as Kaandakali and Kendikli) is a village in, and the capital of, Sarakhs Rural District in the Central District of Sarakhs County, Razavi Khorasan province, Iran.

== Demographics ==
=== Population ===
At the time of the 2006 National Census, the village's population was 1,507 in 355 households. The following census in 2011 counted 1,718 people in 465 households. The 2016 census measured the population of the village as 1,518 people in 451 households.
