= Tam-e Mokhtar =

Village in Razavi Khorasan province, Iran

Tam-e Mokhtar Persian: تام مختار
- Village
- Location within Iran
- Coordinates: 36°34′52″N 61°04′34″E
- Country: Iran
- Province: Razavi Khorasan
- County: Sarakhs
- District: Central
- Rural District: Sarakhs

Population (2016)
  - Total: 424
- Time zone: UTC+3:30 (IRST)

Tam-e Mokhtar (Persian: تام مختار) (Note: Also romanized as Tām-e Mokhtār; also known as Mokhtār) is a village in Sarakhs Rural District of the Central District in Sarakhs County, Razavi Khorasan province, Iran.

== Demographics ==
=== Population ===
At the time of the 2006 National Census, the village's population was 415 in 90 households. The following census in 2011 counted 432 people in 113 households. The 2016 census measured the population of the village as 424 people in 120 households.
