= Daq-e Bohlul =

Village in Razavi Khorasan province, Iran

Daq-e Bohlul Persian: دق بهلول
- Village
- Location within Iran
- Coordinates: 36°19′45″N 60°48′34″E
- Country: Iran
- Province: Razavi Khorasan
- County: Sarakhs
- District: Central
- Rural District: Khangiran

Population (2016)
  - Total: 486
- Time zone: UTC+3:30 (IRST)

Daq-e Bohlul (Persian: دق بهلول) (Note: Also romanized as Daq-e Bohlūl) is a village in Khangiran Rural District of the Central District in Sarakhs County, Razavi Khorasan province, Iran.

== Demographics ==
=== Population ===
At the time of the 2006 National Census, the village's population was 466 in 98 households. The following census in 2011 counted 130 people in 34 households. The 2016 census measured the population of the village as 486 people in 122 households.
