= Sangar, Razavi Khorasan =

Village in Razavi Khorasan province, Iran

Sangar Persian: سنگر
- Village
- Location within Iran
- Coordinates: 36°12′01″N 61°11′43″E
- Country: Iran
- Province: Razavi Khorasan
- County: Sarakhs
- District: Central
- Rural District: Tajan

Population (2016)
  - Total: 1,369
- Time zone: UTC+3:30 (IRST)

Sangar (Persian: سنگر) is a village in, and the capital of, Tajan Rural District in the Central District of Sarakhs County, Razavi Khorasan province, Iran.

== Demographics ==
=== Population ===
At the time of the 2006 National Census, the village's population was 1,750 in 397 households. The following census in 2011 counted 1,614 people in 414 households. The 2016 census measured the population of the village as 1,369 people in 387 households.
