= Tam-e Mirza Hasan =

Village in Razavi Khorasan province, Iran

Tam-e Mirza Hasan Persian: تام ميرزاحسن
- Village
- Location within Iran
- Country: Iran
- Province: Razavi Khorasan
- County: Sarakhs
- District: Central
- Rural District: Sarakhs

Population (2016)
  - Total: 2,479
- Time zone: UTC+3:30 (IRST)

Tam-e Mirza Hasan (Persian: تام ميرزاحسن) (Note: Also romanized as Tām-e Mīrzā Ḩasan) is a village in Sarakhs Rural District of the Central District in Sarakhs County, Razavi Khorasan province, Iran.

== Demographics ==
=== Population ===
At the time of the 2006 National Census, the village's population was 2,180 in 466 households. The following census in 2011 counted 2,383 people in 630 households. The 2016 census measured the population of the village as 2,479 people in 620 households.
