= Tappeh-ye Mir Ahmad =

Village in Razavi Khorasan province, Iran

Tappeh-ye Mir Ahmad Persian: تپه ميراحمد
- Village
- Location within Iran
- Coordinates: 36°34′21″N 61°07′59″E
- Country: Iran
- Province: Razavi Khorasan
- County: Sarakhs
- District: Central
- Rural District: Sarakhs

Population (2016)
  - Total: 2,762
- Time zone: UTC+3:30 (IRST)

Tappeh-ye Mir Ahmad (Persian: تپه ميراحمد) (Note: Also romanized as Tappeh-ye Mīr Aḩmad) is a village in Sarakhs Rural District of the Central District in Sarakhs County, Razavi Khorasan province, Iran.

== Demographics ==
=== Population ===
At the time of the 2006 National Census, the village's population was 2,639 in 574 households. The following census in 2011 counted 2,828 people in 708 households. The 2016 census measured the population of the village as 2,762 people in 743 households, the most populous in its rural district.
