= Now Bonyad-e Gonbadli =

Village in Razavi Khorasan province, Iran

Now Bonyad-e Gonbadli Persian: نوبنيادگنبدلي
- Village
- Location within Iran
- Coordinates: 36°23′44″N 60°52′41″E
- Country: Iran
- Province: Razavi Khorasan
- County: Sarakhs
- District: Central
- Rural District: Khangiran

Population (2016)
  - Total: 581
- Time zone: UTC+3:30 (IRST)

Now Bonyad-e Gonbadli (Persian: نوبنيادگنبدلي) (Note: Also romanized as Now Bonyād-e Gonbadlī; also known as Now Bonyād) is a village in Khangiran Rural District of the Central District in Sarakhs County, Razavi Khorasan province, Iran.

== Demographics ==
=== Population ===
At the time of the 2006 National Census, the village's population was 501 in 123 households. The following census in 2011 counted 559 people in 159 households. The 2016 census measured the population of the village as 581 people in 170 households.
