= Qatar Chah =

Village in Razavi Khorasan province, Iran

Qatar Chah Persian: قطارچاه
- Village
- Location within Iran
- Country: Iran
- Province: Razavi Khorasan
- County: Sarakhs
- District: Central
- Rural District: Khangiran

Population (2016)
  - Total: 180
- Time zone: UTC+3:30 (IRST)

Qatar Chah (Persian: قطارچاه) (Note: Also romanized as Qaţār Chāh) is a village in Khangiran Rural District of the Central District in Sarakhs County, Razavi Khorasan province, Iran.

== Demographics ==
=== Population ===
At the time of the 2006 National Census, the village's population was 134 in 26 households. The following census in 2011 counted 129 people in 35 households. The 2016 census measured the population of the village as 180 people in 46 households.
