= Ab Mal, Sarakhs =

Village in Razavi Khorasan province, Iran

Ab Mal Persian: ابمال
- Village
- Location within Iran
- Coordinates: 36°18′54.5″N 60°49′13.1″E
- Country: Iran
- Province: Razavi Khorasan
- County: Sarakhs
- District: Central
- Rural District: Khangiran

Population (2016)
  - Total: 793
- Time zone: UTC+3:30 (IRST)

Ab Mal (Persian: ابمال) (Note: Also romanized as Āb Māl) is a village in Khangiran Rural District of the Central District in Sarakhs County, Razavi Khorasan province, Iran.

== Demographics ==
=== Population ===
At the time of the 2006 National Census, the village's population was 629 in 130 households. The following census in 2011 counted 715 people in 193 households. The 2016 census measured the population of the village as 793 people in 218 households.
