= Tam-e Rasul =

Village in Razavi Khorasan province, Iran

Tam-e Rasul Persian: تام رسول
- Village
- Location within Iran
- Coordinates: 36°34′56″N 61°00′55″E
- Country: Iran
- Province: Razavi Khorasan
- County: Sarakhs
- District: Central
- Rural District: Sarakhs

Population (2016)
  - Total: 1,119
- Time zone: UTC+3:30 (IRST)

Tam-e Rasul (Persian: تام رسول) (Note: Also romanized as Tām-e Rasūl) is a village in Sarakhs Rural District of the Central District in Sarakhs County, Razavi Khorasan province, Iran.

== Demographics ==
=== Population ===
At the time of the 2006 National Census, the village's population was 1,270 in 272 households. The following census in 2011 counted 1,210 people in 308 households. The 2016 census measured the population of the village as 1,119 people in 288 households.
