= Kalateh-ye Allah Nazar =

Village in Razavi Khorasan province, Iran

Kalateh-ye Allah Nazar Persian: كلاته اله نظر
- Village
- Location within Iran
- Coordinates: 36°24′15″N 60°49′39″E
- Country: Iran
- Province: Razavi Khorasan
- County: Sarakhs
- District: Central
- Rural District: Khangiran

Population (2016)
  - Total: 1,113
- Time zone: UTC+3:30 (IRST)

Kalateh-ye Allah Nazar (Persian: كلاته اله نظر) (Note: Also romanized as Kalāteh-ye Āllāh Naz̧ar) is a village in Khangiran Rural District of the Central District in Sarakhs County, Razavi Khorasan province, Iran.

== Demographics ==
=== Population ===
At the time of the 2006 National Census, the village's population was 947 in 211 households. The following census in 2011 counted 1,071 people in 287 households. The 2016 census measured the population of the village as 1,113 people in 314 households.
