= Nowruzabad, Sarakhs =

Village in Razavi Khorasan province, Iran

Nowruzabad Persian: نوروزاباد
- Village
- Location within Iran
- Coordinates: 36°16′10″N 61°10′22″E
- Country: Iran
- Province: Razavi Khorasan
- County: Sarakhs
- District: Central
- Rural District: Tajan

Population (2016)
  - Total: 269
- Time zone: UTC+3:30 (IRST)

Nowruzabad (Persian: نوروزاباد) (Note: Also romanized as Nowrūz Ābād and Nowrūzābād) is a village in Tajan Rural District of the Central District in Sarakhs County, Razavi Khorasan province, Iran.

== Demographics ==
=== Population ===
At the time of the 2006 National Census, the village's population was 235 in 50 households. The following census in 2011 counted 229 people in 59 households. The 2016 census measured the population of the village as 269 people in 69 households.
