= Golzar, Razavi Khorasan =

Village in Razavi Khorasan province, Iran

Golzar Persian: گلزار
- Village
- Location within Iran
- Coordinates: 36°12′32″N 60°55′00″E
- Country: Iran
- Province: Razavi Khorasan
- County: Sarakhs
- District: Central
- Rural District: Khangiran

Population (2016)
  - Total: 124
- Time zone: UTC+3:30 (IRST)

Golzar (Persian: گلزار) (Note: Also romanized as Golzār; also known as Tappeh Soleymān) is a village in Khangiran Rural District of the Central District in Sarakhs County, Razavi Khorasan province, Iran.

== Demographics ==
=== Population ===
At the time of the 2006 National Census, the village's population was 120 in 28 households. The following census in 2011 counted 112 people in 30 households. The 2016 census measured the population of the village as 124 people in 33 households.
