= Gonbadli, Razavi Khorasan =

Village in Razavi Khorasan province, Iran

Gonbadli Persian: گنبدلي
- Village
- Location within Iran
- Coordinates: 36°23′09″N 60°51′33″E
- Country: Iran
- Province: Razavi Khorasan
- County: Sarakhs
- District: Central
- Rural District: Khangiran

Population (2016)
  - Total: 1,877
- Time zone: UTC+3:30 (IRST)

Gonbadli (Persian: گنبدلي) (Note: Also romanized as Gonbadlī; also known as Gombazlī, Gonbadlī-ye Now, Gondadalī, Gumbāzl, and Gumbazli) is a village in, and the capital of, Khangiran Rural District in the Central District of Sarakhs County, Razavi Khorasan province, Iran.

== Demographics ==
=== Population ===
At the time of the 2006 National Census, the village's population was 1,556 in 362 households. The following census in 2011 counted 1,893 people in 493 households. The 2016 census measured the population of the village as 1,877 people in 559 households, the most populous in its rural district.
