= Shir Tappeh =

Village in Razavi Khorasan province, Iran

Shir Tappeh Persian: شيرتپه
- Village
- Location within Iran
- Coordinates: 36°06′50″N 61°12′27″E
- Country: Iran
- Province: Razavi Khorasan
- County: Sarakhs
- District: Central
- Rural District: Tajan

Population (2016)
  - Total: 2,643
- Time zone: UTC+3:30 (IRST)

Shir Tappeh (Persian: شيرتپه) (Note: Also romanized as Shīr Tappeh; also known as Shīr Tepe) is a village in Tajan Rural District of the Central District in Sarakhs County, Razavi Khorasan province, Iran.

== Demographics ==
=== Population ===
At the time of the 2006 National Census, the village's population was 2,805 in 624 households. The following census in 2011 counted 2,886 people in 755 households. The 2016 census measured the population of the village as 2,643 people in 713 households, the most populous in its rural district.
