= Cheshmeh Shur, Razavi Khorasan =

Village in Razavi Khorasan province, Iran

Cheshmeh Shur Persian: چشمه شور
- Village
- Location within Iran
- Coordinates: 36°31′29″N 60°35′28″E
- Country: Iran
- Province: Razavi Khorasan
- County: Sarakhs
- District: Central
- Rural District: Khangiran

Population (2016)
  - Total: 565
- Time zone: UTC+3:30 (IRST)

Cheshmeh Shur (Persian: چشمه شور) (Note: Also romanized as Cheshmeh Shūr) is a village in Khangiran Rural District of the Central District in Sarakhs County, Razavi Khorasan province, Iran.

== Demographics ==
=== Population ===
At the time of the 2006 National Census, the village's population was 524 in 114 households. The following census in 2011 counted 590 people in 174 households. The 2016 census measured the population of the village as 565 people in 150 households.
