= Qaleh Qassab =

Village in Razavi Khorasan province, Iran

Qaleh Qassab Persian: قلعه قصاب
- Village
- Location within Iran
- Coordinates: 36°24′23″N 61°08′43″E
- Country: Iran
- Province: Razavi Khorasan
- County: Sarakhs
- District: Central
- Rural District: Tajan

Population (2016)
  - Total: 276
- Time zone: UTC+3:30 (IRST)

Qaleh Qassab (Persian: قلعه قصاب) (Note: Also romanized as Qal‘eh Qaşşāb) is a village in Tajan Rural District of the Central District in Sarakhs County, Razavi Khorasan province, Iran.

== Demographics ==
=== Population ===
At the time of the 2006 National Census, the village's population was 273 in 60 households. The following census in 2011 counted 278 people in 73 households. The 2016 census measured the population of the village as 276 people in 76 households.
