= Khangiran Rural District =

Rural district in Razavi Khorasan province, Iran

Khangiran Rural District Persian: دهستان خانگيران
- Rural District
- Location within Iran
- Coordinates: 36°20′N 60°45′E
- Country: Iran
- Province: Razavi Khorasan
- County: Sarakhs
- District: Central
- Established: 1986
- Capital: Gonbadli

Population (2016)
  - Total: 7,600
- Time zone: UTC+3:30 (IRST)

Khangiran Rural District (Persian: دهستان خانگيران) is in the Central District of Sarakhs County, Razavi Khorasan province, Iran. Its capital is the village of Gonbadli.

== Demographics ==
=== Population ===
At the time of the 2006 National Census, the rural district's population was 6,530 in 1,445 households. There were 6,829 inhabitants in 1,854 households at the following census of 2011. The 2016 census measured the population of the rural district as 7,600 in 2,102 households. The most populous of its 31 villages was Gonbadli, with 1,877 people.

=== Other villages in the rural district ===
- Ab Mal
- Chaleh Zard
- Cheshmeh Shur
- Daq-e Bohlul
- Eslam Qaleh
- Golzar
- Kalateh-ye Allah Nazar
- Now Bonyad-e Gonbadli
- Qatar Chah
