= Qush-e Chaker =

Village in Razavi Khorasan province, Iran

Qush-e Chaker Persian: قوش چاكر
- Village
- Location within Iran
- Coordinates: 36°33′59″N 61°03′54″E
- Country: Iran
- Province: Razavi Khorasan
- County: Sarakhs
- District: Central
- Rural District: Sarakhs

Population (2016)
  - Total: 706
- Time zone: UTC+3:30 (IRST)

Qush-e Chaker (Persian: قوش چاكر) (Note: Also romanized as Qūsh-e Chāker) is a village in Sarakhs Rural District of the Central District in Sarakhs County, Razavi Khorasan province, Iran.

== Demographics ==
=== Population ===
At the time of the 2006 National Census, the village's population was 678 in 137 households. The following census in 2011 counted 736 people in 195 households. The 2016 census measured the population of the village as 706 people in 193 households.
