= Sarakhs Rural District =

Rural district in Razavi Khorasan province, Iran

Sarakhs Rural District Persian: دهستان سرخس
- Rural District
- Location within Iran
- Coordinates: 36°35′N 60°46′E
- Country: Iran
- Province: Razavi Khorasan
- County: Sarakhs
- District: Central
- Established: 1986
- Capital: Kandakli

Population (2016)
  - Total: 17,734
- Time zone: UTC+3:30 (IRST)

Sarakhs Rural District (Persian: دهستان سرخس) is in the Central District of Sarakhs County, Razavi Khorasan province, Iran. Its capital is the village of Kandakli.

== Demographics ==
=== Population ===
At the time of the 2006 National Census, the rural district's population was 16,167 in 3,519 households. There were 17,366 inhabitants in 4,392 households at the following census of 2011. The 2016 census measured the population of the rural district as 17,734 in 4,675 households. The most populous of its 26 villages was Tappeh-ye Mir Ahmad, with 2,762 people.

=== Other villages in the rural district ===
- Ebrahimabad
- Frontier Battalion
- Latifabad
- Qush-e Alijan
- Qush-e Chaker
- Qush-e Khazai
- Qush-e Kohneh
- Tam-e Mirza Hasan
- Tam-e Mokhtar
- Tam-e Rasul
- Yas Tappeh
