= Qush-e Sarbuzi =

Village in Razavi Khorasan province, Iran

Qush-e Sarbuzi Persian: قوش سربوزي
- Village
- Location within Iran
- Coordinates: 36°23′09″N 61°07′59″E
- Country: Iran
- Province: Razavi Khorasan
- County: Sarakhs
- District: Central
- Rural District: Tajan

Population (2016)
  - Total: 2,188
- Time zone: UTC+3:30 (IRST)

Qush-e Sarbuzi (Persian: قوش سربوزي) (Note: Also romanized as Qūsh-e Sarbūzī; also known as Qūsh Sar Nūrī) is a village in Tajan Rural District of the Central District in Sarakhs County, Razavi Khorasan province, Iran.

== Demographics ==
=== Population ===
At the time of the 2006 National Census, the village's population was 2,032 in 373 households. The following census in 2011 counted 2,191 people in 481 households. The 2016 census measured the population of the village as 2,188 people in 542 households.
