= Tomb of Baba Loghman =

Iranian national heritage site

Mausoleum of Baba Loghman آرامگاه بابا لقمان
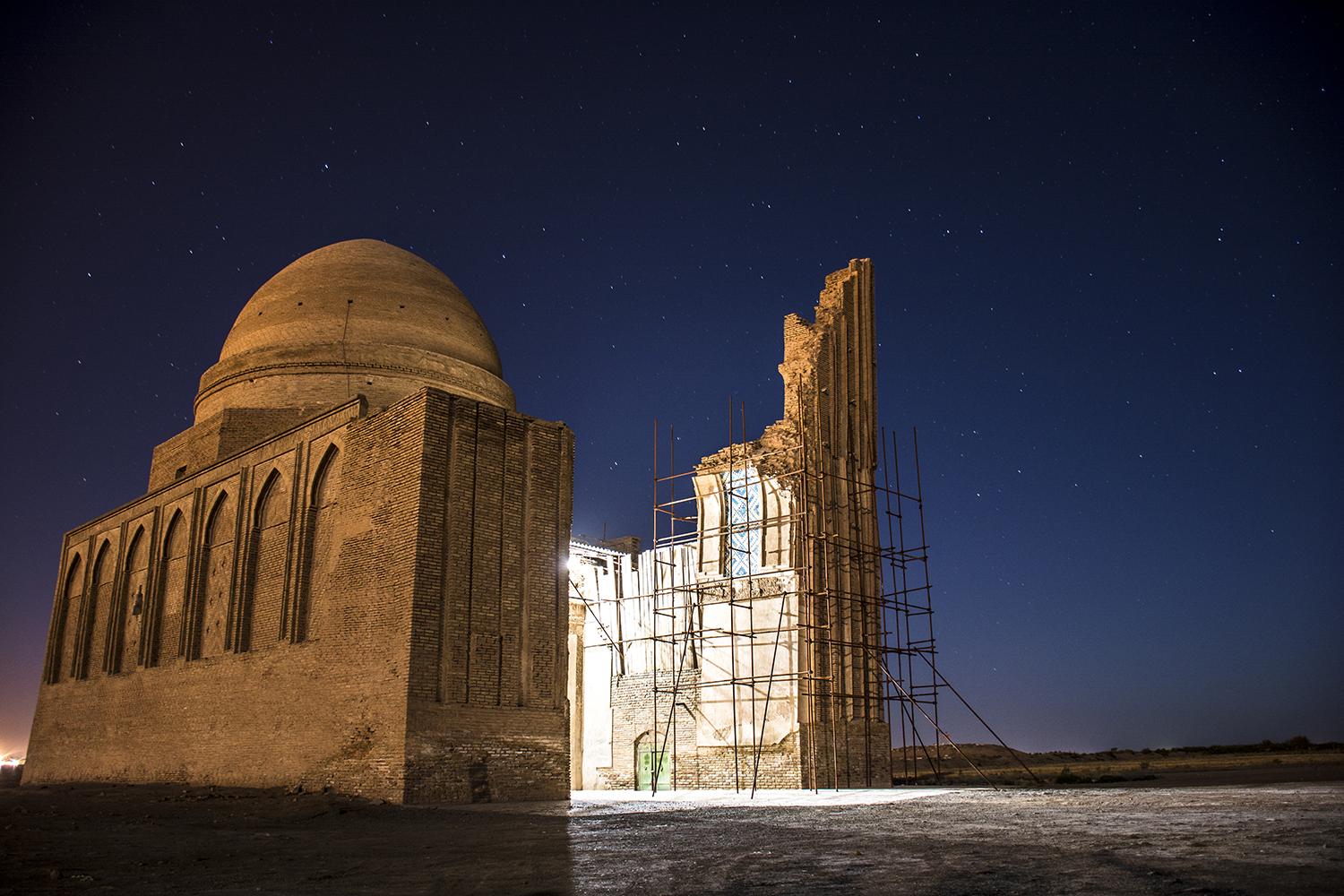

- Location within Iran
- 36°33′37.1″N 61°09′24.5″E
- Location: Sarakhs, Khorasan, Iran

Iran National Heritage List
- Official name: Mausoleum of Baba Loghman
- Type: Mausoleum
- Designated: 1932
- Reference no.: 165
- Conservation organization: Cultural Heritage, Handicrafts and Tourism Organization of Iran

The Tomb of Baba Loghman (Persian: آرامگاه بابا لقمان) in Sarakhs is the site of the Loghman Sorakhi burial. The building is thought to be the ceremonial tomb of Sufi mystic Babalqaman Sarakhsi. As well as a tall dome there are two brick enclosing walls and a long porch. On the body of each side, an opening allows natural light to illuminate the dome. There are important plasterwork embellishments and fine brickwork: interior arches are decorated with rhombic geometric patterns.

Overall the architecture is considered similar to the Tomb of Ahmed Sanjar.
