= Baluchi rug =

Term for a handmade carpet from Balochistan

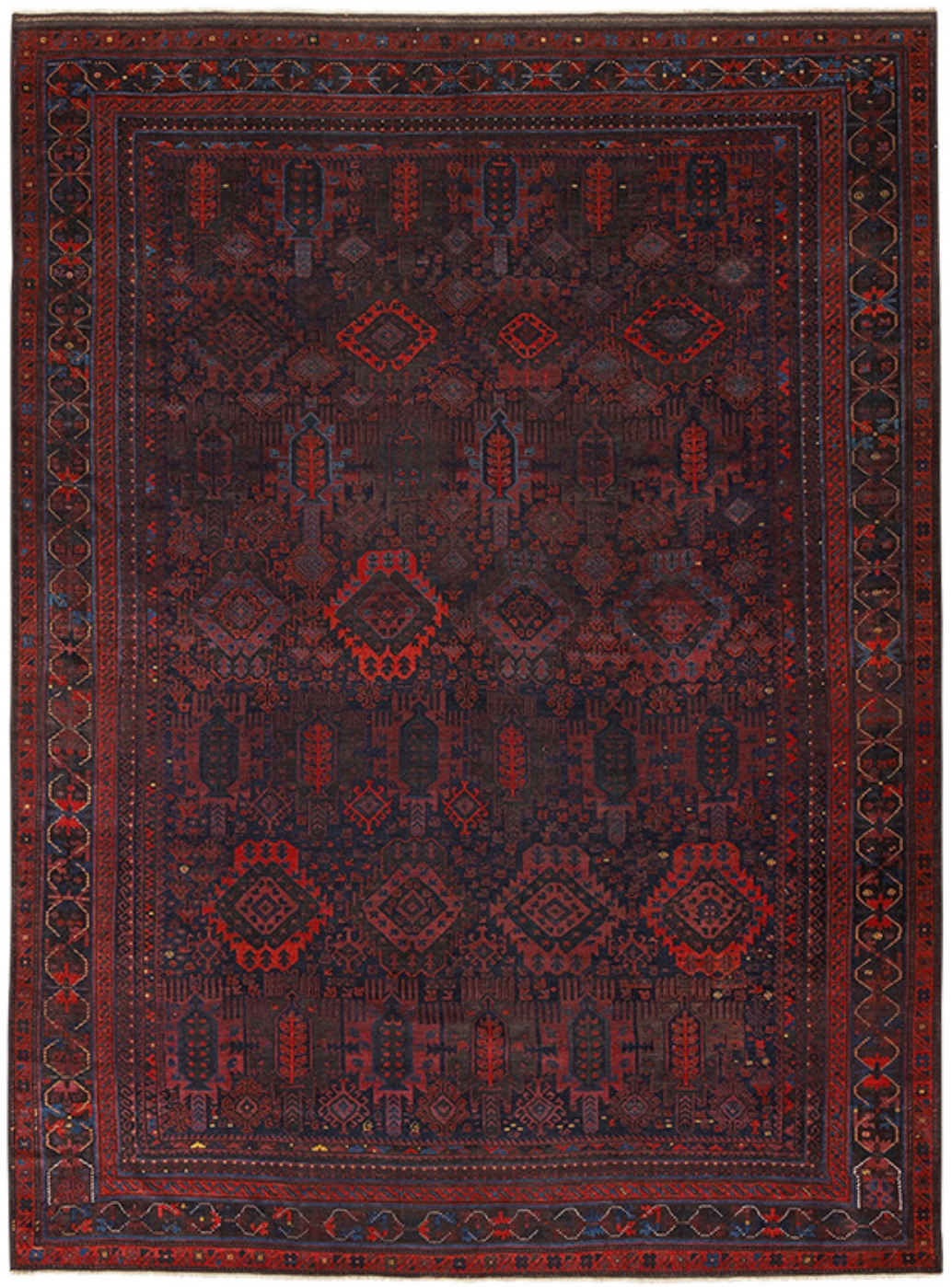
Image of a Balochi rug

Balochi rugs (Balochi: بلۏچی پرش) are a group of carpets woven by the Baloch tribes in Nimroz province, Sistan-Baluchistan province, and Khorasan province (Khorasani Baloch) in the northeast and southeast of Iran.

== Techniques and structures ==
Balochi rugs are typically eight feet in length, which made them lighter and simpler to transport.

Nature, animal figurines, religious beliefs in Balochi prayer rugs, and objects of interest and use by the people of the tribe and the villagers are visualized in these designs. They are mostly designed geometrically with lines and surfaces, creating abstract and non-abstract patterns.

Mehrabi is a prayer rug designed in the Balochi style, and it typically features a mihrab or arch at one end of the rug.

== Materials and colors ==
Their material typically includes wool or a mixture of wool and goat hair; newer carpets have a warp made of cotton and sturdy wool pile rugs.

Balochi rugs tend to be a dark combination of reds, browns, and blues, with touches of white.

== Gallery ==
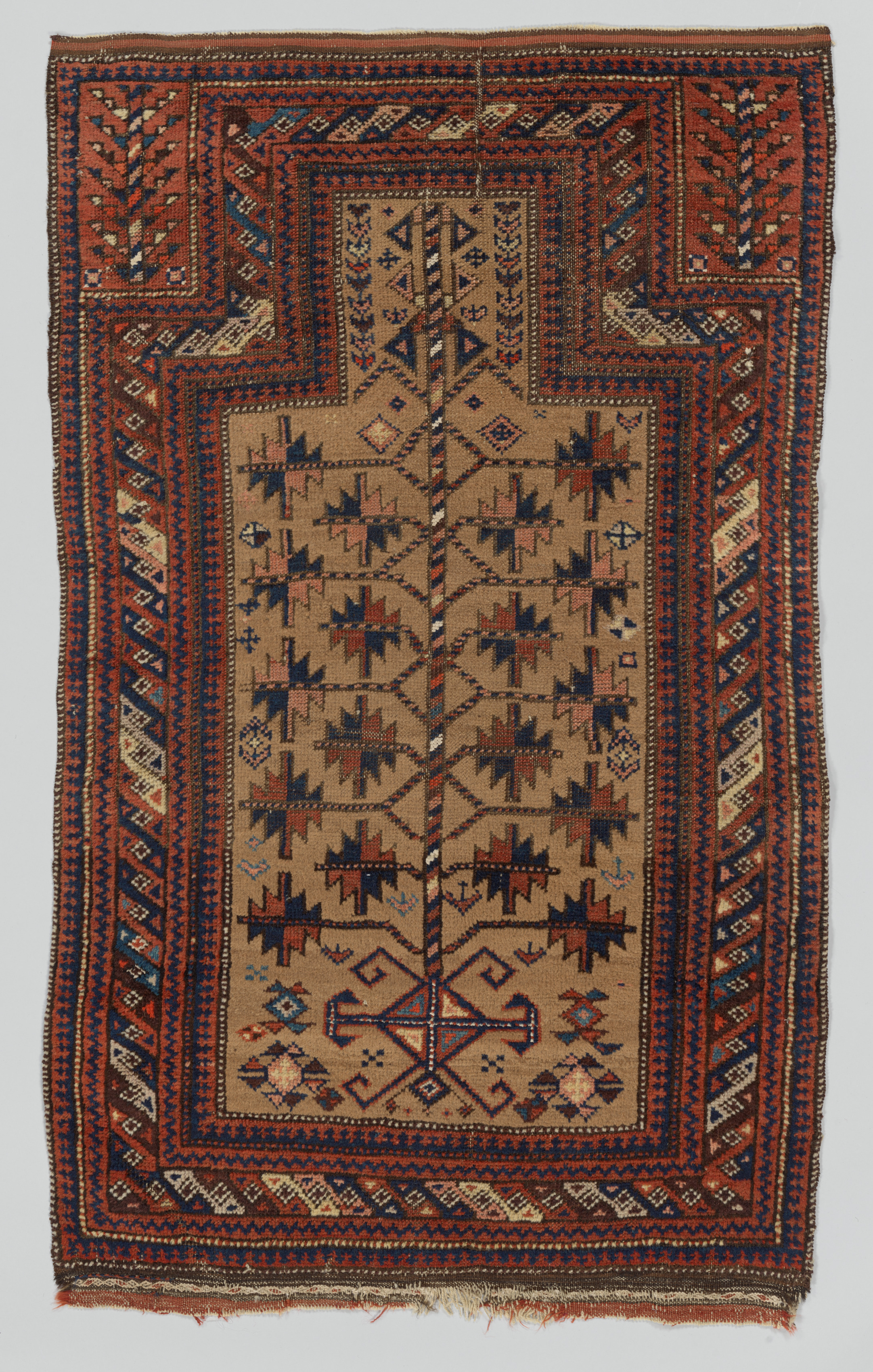
Balochi rug woven in Balochistan, 20th century, among the works of art the Cleveland Museum of Art (CMA).

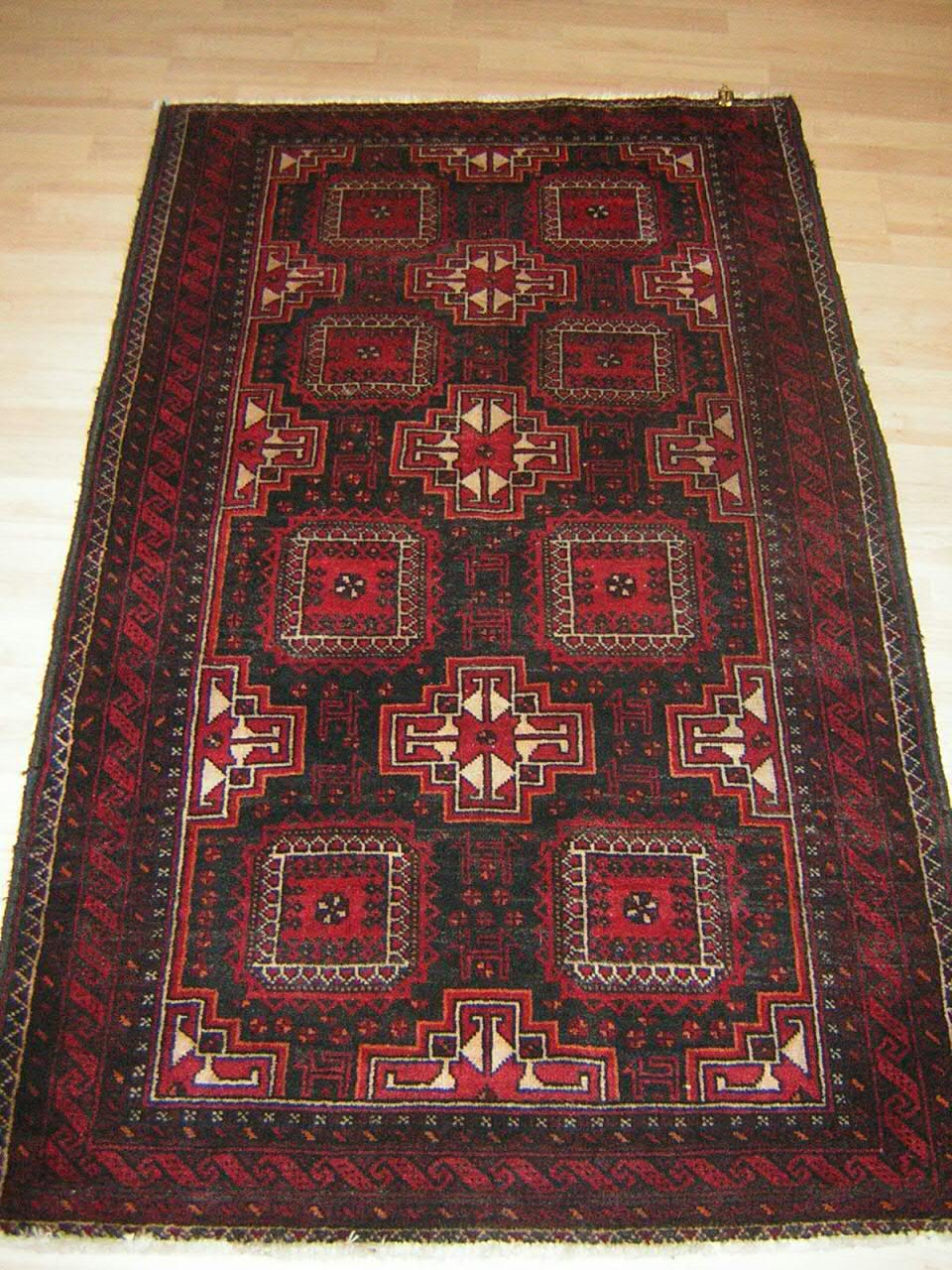
Another Balochi rug

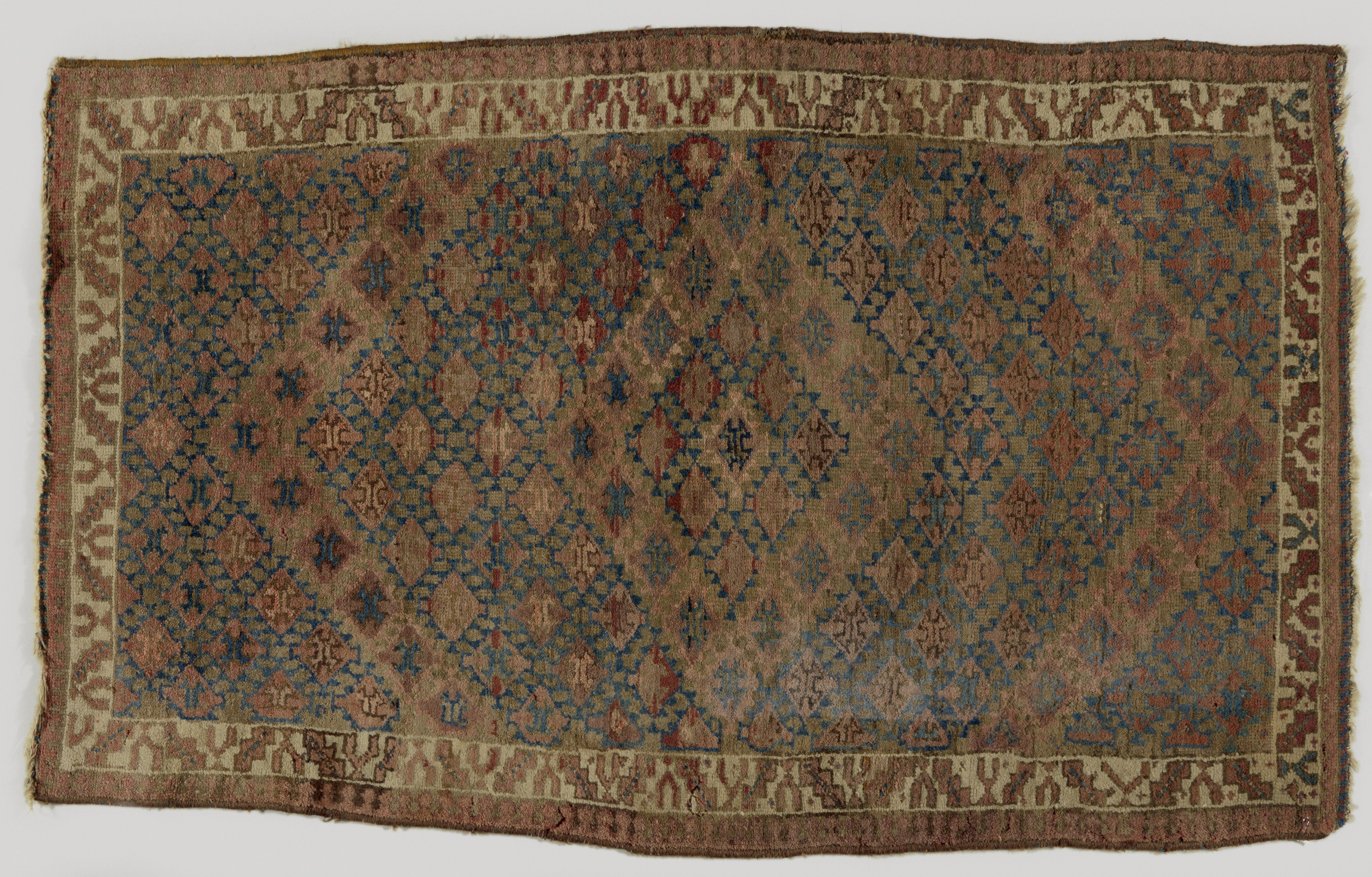
Balochi rug (1975)

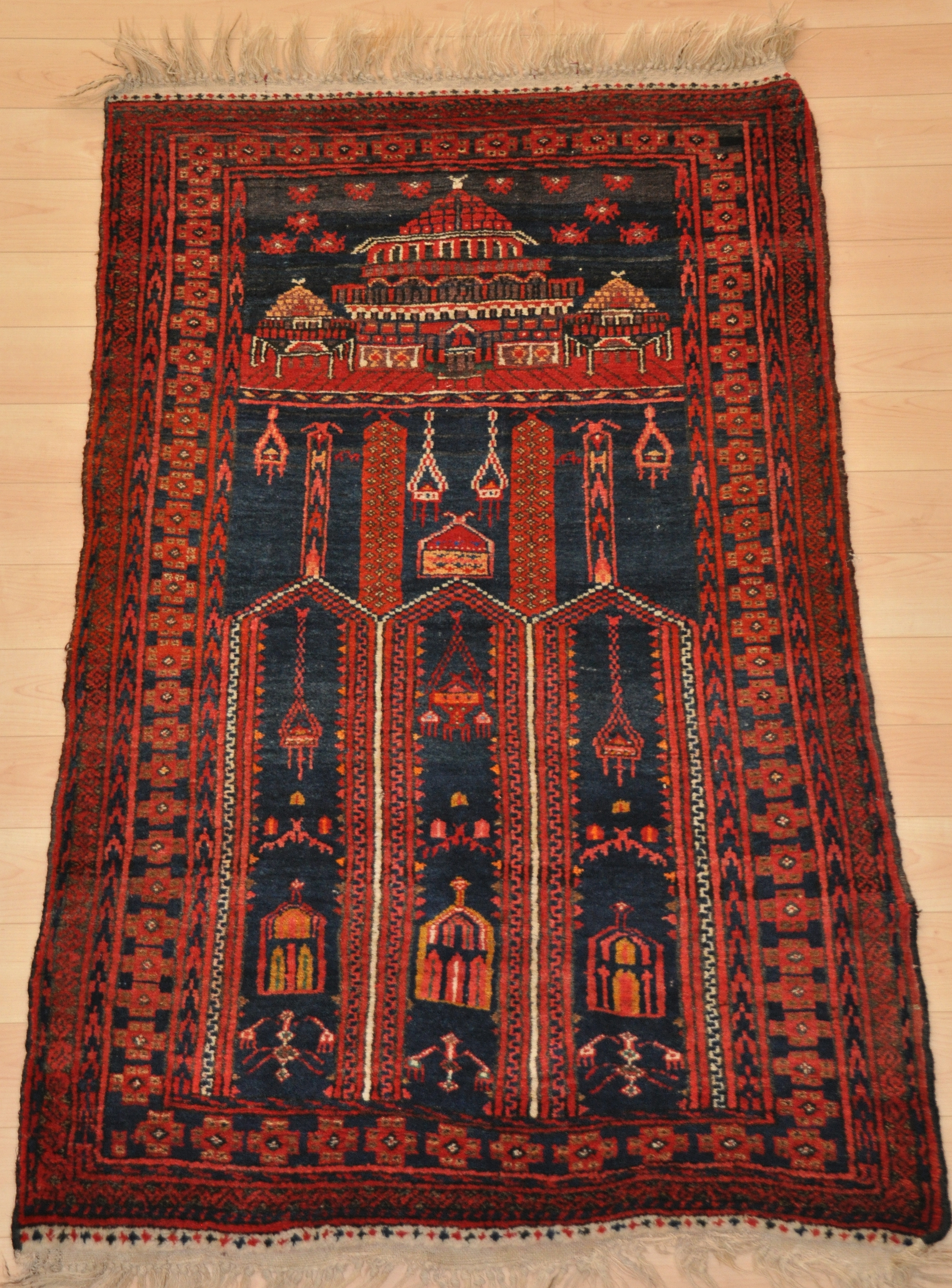
Vintage Baloch prayer rug
