= Qush-e Kohneh =

Village in Razavi Khorasan province, Iran

Qush-e Kohneh Persian: قوش كهنه
- Village
- Location within Iran
- Coordinates: 36°28′58″N 61°07′56″E
- Country: Iran
- Province: Razavi Khorasan
- County: Sarakhs
- District: Central
- Rural District: Sarakhs

Population (2016)
  - Total: 561
- Time zone: UTC+3:30 (IRST)

Qush-e Kohneh (Persian: قوش كهنه) (Note: Also romanized as Qūsh-e Kohneh) is a village in Sarakhs Rural District of the Central District in Sarakhs County, Razavi Khorasan province, Iran.

== Demographics ==
=== Population ===
At the time of the 2006 National Census, the village's population was 588 in 134 households. The following census in 2011 counted 550 people in 143 households. The 2016 census measured the population of the village as 561 people in 162 households.
