= Eslam Qaleh, Sarakhs =

Village in Razavi Khorasan province, Iran

Eslam Qaleh Persian: اسلام قلعه
- Village
- Location within Iran
- Coordinates: 36°28′57″N 60°45′30″E
- Country: Iran
- Province: Razavi Khorasan
- County: Sarakhs
- District: Central
- Rural District: Khangiran

Population (2016)
  - Total: 844
- Time zone: UTC+3:30 (IRST)

Eslam Qaleh (Persian: اسلام قلعه) (Note: Also romanized as Eslām Qal‘eh; also known as Kāfer Qal‘eh (كافرقلعه)) is a village in Khangiran Rural District of the Central District in Sarakhs County, Razavi Khorasan province, Iran.

== Demographics ==
=== Population ===
At the time of the 2006 National Census, the village's population was 665 in 156 households. The following census in 2011 counted 821 people in 241 households. The 2016 census measured the population of the village as 844 people in 259 households.
