= Kurdish involvement in the Armenian genocide =

Aspect of the genocide

- The cover of a New York Times article published on April 26, 1915
- Location: Ottoman Empire
- Date: 1915-1917
- Perpetrators: Nomadic and irregular Kurds, forces of Simko Shikak

The participation of some Kurdish tribes in the Armenian genocide was part of the Ottoman government’s wider efforts to bring tribal leaders under its influence and incorporate tribal forces into its military structures. Nomadic Kurds committed many atrocities during the genocide, but settled Kurds only rarely did so. along with the Turks and other people, participated in massacres of Armenians. Other Kurds opposed the genocide, in some cases even hiding or adopting Armenian refugees. Several prominent Kurdish politicians made statements or published articles and books regarding the Armenian genocide.

== Background ==
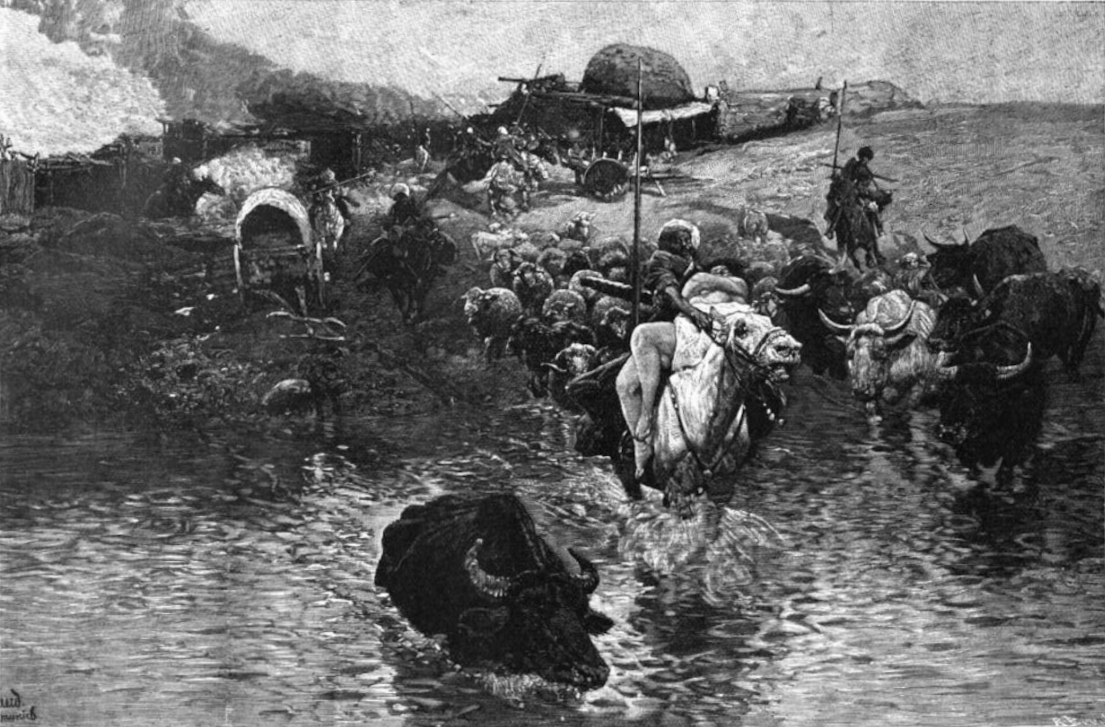
"Looting of an Armenian village by the Kurds", 1898 or 1899

Earlier instances of Kurdish participation in violence against Armenians included the Hamidian massacres of 1894–1896, during which Ottoman forces and Kurdish irregulars committed atrocities against Armenians in the Ottoman Empire. The massacres were named after Sultan Abdülhamid II, during whose reign they took place.

== Armenian genocide ==
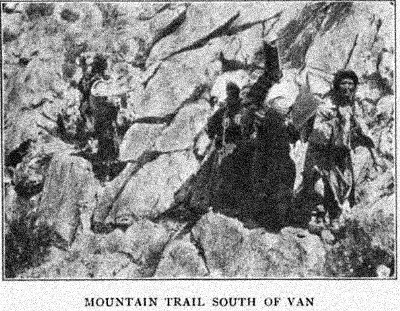
Refugees at the mountain passes attacked by Kurds

The genocide of Armenians was meticulously carried out with help from tribal Kurds who were organized into an auxiliary force called the Hamidiye Cavalry of the Ottoman government in Constantinople. Also, inmates in Ottoman prisons, including Kurds and Turks, were given amnesty and released from prison if they would massacre the Armenians. Historian Raymond Kévorkian believes that the role of Kurds as perpetrators in the genocide has sometimes been overstated, beginning with Turkish historians eager to shift blame to Kurds. Kévorkian states that many nomadic Kurdish tribes actively participated in the genocide but settled Kurds only rarely did so.

January 1915 – Armenians and Cossack (Russian) soldiers waiting for Kurdish Cavalry

General Myshlayevsky, ordered the evacuation of Urmia and Tabriz. Ottoman and Kurdish forces led by the Kurdish Agha, Simko Shikak filled the vacuum in January 1915 and massacred the local Armenians and Assyrian/Syriac Christians.

During the Van Resistance, Armenians who left via Persia took defensive positions in Bargiri, Saray and Hosap districts of the Van Province. A refugee group following the Russian forces were intercepted by Kurdish forces when they crossed the mountain passes near the Bargiri Pass, and suffered many casualties there.

The security of the refugees had been nominally the responsibility of the Ottoman Empire. The Ottoman authorities stated that some groups of refugees were attacked by local tribes (Kurdish and Arab), before they reached their destinations. These attacks mainly took place on the roads between Aleppo and Meskene, but it was also dangerous from Diyarbekir to Der Zor and from Saruc to Halep on the Menbic Road. This region is heavily populated by Kurds.

Rober Koptaş estimates that the majority of Kurds in Turkey acknowledge the Armenian genocide.

== List of recognition ==
Type	Recognize	Date	Declaration
NGO	Kurdish Institute of Paris		The Kurdish Institute of Paris has recognized the 1915 massacres as genocide. The Armenian genocide is often mentioned in the monthly magazine published by the Kurdish Institute.
NGO	Center of Halabja against Anfalization and Genocide of the Kurds (CHAK)		Welcomed the recognition of genocide against the Armenian people. The motivation from CHAK was: "This recognition will help us all to have a broader understanding of past crimes and present us with the possibility of a peaceful and brighter future." In 2006, CHAK published an article about the Armenian genocide called "Armenian Genocide: Turkey To Target". and over 10 articles regarding the genocide have earlier been published.
Political	Democratic Society Party (DTP)	30 Dec 2008	The party leader Ahmet Türk apologized to Armenians and Assyrians for the massacres inflicted on them.
Political	Peoples' Democratic Party (HDP)		Its party co-chair Selahattin Demirtaş acknowledged the existence of the Armenian genocide in an interview he gave to Civilnet. In 2014 Ahmet Türk acknowledged the Kurdish role in Armenian genocide.
Political	Kurdistan Democratic Party (KDP)		In the website for KDP supporters published an article (author: Nezîr Semmikanli) where he writes about the Armenian genocide where he describes the genocide as a crime against the Christian people The party leader Masoud Barzani published a book about the Armenian genocide.
PKK	Abdullah Öcalan	10 Apr 1998; 30 Jan 2014	In a 10 April 1998 personal letter to Robert Kocharyan, the newly inaugurated President of Armenia, Öcalan congratulated him on his election victory and expressed hope that the genocide would be officially recognized in Turkey: "I also welcome and endorse the passage of a resolution in the Belgian Senate calling on the Turkish government in Ankara to recognise the reality of the Armenian holocaust perpetrated by the last Ottoman regime in 1915–19 ... The massacres during the First World War which shocked the civilised world then became a precedent for an even more appalling and destructive demonstration of genocide of the Jewish people by the German Nazis in the Second World War. Let us recall Hitler's response to a critic of the 'final solution' of the Jewish problem: 'Who complained about the Armenians?'" Öcalan reiterated this position in a letter published on 30 January 2014 by the Istanbul-based Armenian weekly Agos. Throughout the letter, written from his cell in İmralı Prison, he repeatedly used the word "genocide" to characterise the atrocities, and stated: "Today, the entire world should confront the historical truth of what happened to the Armenians and share their pain, paving the way for mourning. Inevitably, the Turkish Republic too will have to approach this issue with maturity and confront this painful history." He also emphasised that the Kurdish and Armenian struggles were inseparably linked to one another, citing the 2007 assassination of Agos co-founder Hrant Dink as an example of how "anti-democratic forces" within Turkey seek to undermine both causes. Öcalan's letter was an apparent condemnation of incendiary remarks made earlier in the month by KCK co-chair Bese Hozat regarding alleged conspiracies by "Armenian, Jewish, and Greek lobbies" to undermine the democratic movement in Turkey.
PKK	Kurdish Council of Armenia	10 Mar 2009	The president of the Kurdish Council Armenia, Knyaz Hasanov has repeatedly spoken about the Armenian genocide. On March 10, 2009, said Hasanov to the Kurds who participated in massacres against the Armenians were separate Kurds and not the Kurdish nation.
PKK	Kongra-Gel (PKK)	20 Aug 2004	In an interview with Onnik Krikorian from Armenian News Network conducted on 20 August 2004, Kongra-Gel's Caucasus representative Heydar Ali stated: "Armenia's position is more favorable towards the Kurds because 1.5 million Armenians were killed during the Genocide. However, to deny the Kurdish identity in Armenia is a violation of international human rights obligations but yes, you are right. It is well known that throughout history, Kurdistan and the Kurds have been divided and that this is a special policy conducted by very powerful countries in the world to weaken us. The division between Kurds and Yezidi is another manifestation of this."
PKK	Kurdish Parliament in Exile	24 Apr 1997	Passed a resolution recognizing the Armenian genocide. In the resolution, this was said: "The blueprints of and the logistics for this genocide being prepared ahead of time, they employed Hamidiye Alaylari from Kurdish tribes (Similar to the present day Village Guards system who kill our people) to commit history's, until then unknown, Genocide. In this Genocide, millions of Armenians and Assyrian-Syrians were killed, and millions others were deported from their homes and land and scattered to the four corners of the world." Further on in the resolution: "Today is the 82nd anniversary of the genocide committed against the Assyrian-Syriac and Armenian peoples. Sharing the agony caused by this process, I find the Ottoman State and their collaborators the Hamidiye Alaylari, formed by some Kurdish tribes, responsible for this crime before history and I condemn them with abhorrence. Zubeyir Aydar Chairman of the Executive Committee"
Newspaper	Özgur Gündem		Kurdish apologized to the Armenian people for silence and complicity in the Armenian genocide. The Ozgur Gundem website at the same time also had a detailed publications on the genocide, hardships and sufferings of the Armenian people.
NGO	Kurdish Youth Club (USA)		Ara Alan, Secretary General of held a speech in remembrance of the 92nd anniversary of Armenian genocide by the Ottoman Turks. The speech was given in Georgia State Capitol building addressing Armenian Americans, Senators, Congressmen, sheriffs, Judges and representatives of Mayor of Atlanta, and Georgia State Governor.

== See also ==
- Hamidian massacres
- Armenian genocide recognition
