= Qush-e Khazai =

Village in Razavi Khorasan province, Iran

Qush-e Khazai Persian: قوش خزائي
- Village
- Location within Iran
- Coordinates: 36°29′36″N 61°07′26″E
- Country: Iran
- Province: Razavi Khorasan
- County: Sarakhs
- District: Central
- Rural District: Sarakhs

Population (2016)
  - Total: 2,188
- Time zone: UTC+3:30 (IRST)

Qush-e Khazai (Persian: قوش خزائي) (Note: Also romanized as Qūsh-e Khazā’ī) is a village in Sarakhs Rural District of the Central District in Sarakhs County, Razavi Khorasan province, Iran.

== Demographics ==
=== Population ===
At the time of the 2006 National Census, the village's population was 1,979 in 434 households. The following census in 2011 counted 2,064 people in 507 households. The 2016 census measured the population of the village as 2,188 people in 565 households.
