= Asefabad, Razavi Khorasan =

Village in Razavi Khorasan province, Iran

Asefabad Persian: اصف اباد
- Village
- Location within Iran
- Coordinates: 36°26′26″N 61°08′56″E
- Country: Iran
- Province: Razavi Khorasan
- County: Sarakhs
- District: Central
- Rural District: Tajan

Population (2016)
  - Total: 443
- Time zone: UTC+3:30 (IRST)

Asefabad (Persian: اصف اباد) (Note: Also romanized as Āşafābād and Āşefābād) is a village in Tajan Rural District of the Central District in Sarakhs County, Razavi Khorasan province, Iran.

== Demographics ==
=== Population ===
At the time of the 2006 National Census, the village's population was 463 in 99 households. The following census in 2011 counted 438 people in 111 households. The 2016 census measured the population of the village as 443 people in 135 households.
