= Qush-e Alijan =

Village in Razavi Khorasan province, Iran

Qush-e Alijan Persian: قوش عليجان
- Village
- Location within Iran
- Coordinates: 36°30′24″N 61°07′08″E
- Country: Iran
- Province: Razavi Khorasan
- County: Sarakhs
- District: Central
- Rural District: Sarakhs

Population (2016)
  - Total: 1,072
- Time zone: UTC+3:30 (IRST)

Qush-e Alijan (Persian: قوش عليجان) (Note: Also romanized as Qūsh-e ‘Alījān; also known as Qūsh-e ‘Alī Khān) is a village in Sarakhs Rural District of the Central District in Sarakhs County, Razavi Khorasan province, Iran.

== Demographics ==
=== Population ===
At the time of the 2006 National Census, the village's population was 848 in 190 households. The following census in 2011 counted 920 people in 238 households. The 2016 census measured the population of the village as 1,072 people in 292 households.
