= Baloch–Kurdish relations =

Diplomatic relations between Baloch and Kurdish peoples

Baloch–Kurdish relations covers the historical relations between Baloch and Kurds

== History ==
After the spread of Islam, it was common for Baloch and Kurds, as it was for other non-Arab Muslims, to claim Arab descent, usually from a prestigious historical figure. Thus, by the 20th century, the claims of Arab descent for both were dismissed.

Mir Gul Khan Nasir and Longworth Dames asserted that the Baloch and Kurds had the same exact origin, with the distinctions emerging after the Baloch migrated to what later became Balochistan. Gul Khan Nasir claimed that the ancestors of the Baloch and Kurds lived as one people in the Alborz mountains until a group of them fought against Nosherwan, and Nosherwan killed 200,000 Baloch until they fled the Alborz mountains and migrated to Balochistan in groups. Janmahmad Dashti, Baloch academic, stated that "The Kurds are from the same origin as that of Baloch. The period of their migration from the Caspian region may be a few centuries earlier than the Baloch who followed at a later period; but instead of going to their people in Zagros mountainous region, outskirts of Mesopotamia, they headed towards east. Linguistically and culturally they must have been from the same stock." Nasir Dashti asserted that the Baloch and Kurds descended from the Balashchik and Cyrti, two closely allied tribal groups of the same Median origin living in the same region near the Alborz mountains. When the Balashchik left their homeland of Balasagan and migrated to what later became Balochistan, many Cyrti accompanied them and fully merged into them. According to Dashti, many of the proto-Baloch in Kerman, south Makran, and Bashkard were called Cyrtici and were likely the descendants of the Cyrti who migrated with the Balashchik, leading many historians to further link them to the people known as Kuch, who were mentioned towards the end of the Sasanian era as the Kuch and Baluch. Balasagan historically had a known and well documented Kurdish community during the late Sasanian and early Islamic era. Mir Ghaus Bakhsh Bizenjo claimed that the Baloch and Brahui were the same people, and that the only difference was language, with Brahui having some Dravidian influence, adding a possibility that the Brahui adopted the language of the older inhabitants when they migrated to their land. He claimed that the Mengals were not Mongols, the Brahui were not Dravidian, but that they were ethnically Baloch. He then stated that despite the geographical distance, the closest people to the Baloch were the Kurds, and that the two people were the same and one nation, but that he could not say which tribe was the progenitor, and the split happened after the Baloch left the Alborz mountains. 21st century genetic evidence showed that Brahuis were indistinguishable from the Baloch and distant from Dravidian speakers.

It had largely been associated with the lifestyle of Kurds, causing groups which lived a similar lifestyle to also be called Kurds. Similarly, the term Baloch was also initially used for all nomadic groups outside the reach of authorities, before also narrowing down over time to refer to the ethnic Baloch only. Historically, non-Baloch have been called Baloch due to living lifestyles associated with the Baloch.

Kurds historically lived in close proximity to Balochistan. Arab and Persian historians in early Islamic Iran frequently mentioned Kurds living outside Kurdistan. Mas'udi and Istakhri were the first to describe the Kurds and their tribes and presence in Fars. In Muruj al-dhahab, Masudi claimed that the Shuhjan lived at Dinawar and Hamadan, the Majurdan at Kangawar, the Hadhbani and Sarat in Azerbaijan, the Shadanjan, Lurri, Madanjan, Mazdanakan, Barisan, Khali, Jabarki, Jawani, and Mustakan in Jibal, the Dababila in Syria, and the Yaqubiya and Jurqan in Mawsil and Judi, who practiced Christianity. He then added the tribes of Bazinjan, Nashawira, Budhikan, and Kikan. He also gave a list of places where there were Kurds, such as Fars, Kirman, Sijistan, Khurasan (mainly in Asadabad), Isfahan (some Bazinjan as well as a nearby rapidly developing Kurdish town), Jibal, Jazira, Hamadan, Shahrizur, Azerbaijan, and Dvin in Armenia, where Salahuddin was originally from, as well as Arran, Baylakan, Darband, and al-Thughur. Istakhri listed five Kurdish tribes in Fars, the Jiluya or Ramidian, on the borders with Isfahan and Khuzestan, the Lawalijan, between Shiraz and the Persian Gulf and Diwan in the of Sabur, the Kariyan in the direction of Kirman, and the Bazanjan in Isfahan. Based on the records of Diwan al-sadaqat, also produced by Ibn Hawqal and Muqaddasi, Istakhri then produced a list of 33 Kurdish tribes, the Kirmani, Ramani, Mudaththir, Mohammad-Bashar, Baqili (also called Thaalabi according to Muqaddasi), Bundadhmahri, Mohammad-Ishaq, Sabahi, Ishaqi, Adharkani, Shahraki, Tahmadini, Zabadi, Shahrawi, Bundadaki, Khusrawi, Zanji, Safari, Shahyari, Mihraki, Mubaraki, Ishtamhari, Shahuni, Furati, Salmuni, Siri, Azaddokhti, Barazdokhti, Mutallabi, Mamali, Shahkani, Kajti, and Jalili, all numbering 500,000 families living in tents. In the Farsnama, it claimed that all Kurds of Fars were killed after the Islamic conquest of Iran, although some historians doubted the killing of 500,000 families at once and suggested regrouping, migration, and assimilation as other factors for the disappearance of the Kurds of Fars. According to Ibn Balkhi, only one Kurd survived, named Alak, a former warrior who became Muslim and left descendants. Ibn Balkhi then claimed that the Buyid Adud ud Dawla moved more Kurds from Isfahan to Fars. However, Ibn Balkhi distinguished the Shabankara from both the Kurds of Fars which perished after the Islamic conquest, and the Kurds from Isfahan who were moved to Fars. Rashid Yasami claimed that all Kurds originated from Fars, including the ones in Kurdistan, and that the Kurds of Fars were not only a major source of Sasanian support, but Ardashir I himself was a Kurd, claiming that Sasan, Ardashir's grandfather, married a Kurd by the name of Rambehesht. Taking advantage of his powerful Kurdish connections, Papak the son of Sasan sent his son Ardashir as governor to Darabgerd (Darab), which was the center of the Chupanan, or Shabankara, who had also been Sasan's original protectors. These same Kurds of Fars supported Ardashir in his revolt against Ardavan V, the Arsacid ruler. After Ardashir had proclaimed himself king of kings, Ardavan wrote an insulting letter to him which stated "You've bitten off more than you can chew and you have brought death to yourself. O son of a Kurd, raised in the tents of the Kurds, who gave you permission to put a crown on your head?" Not all Kurds supported Ardashir, as both the Shahnameh and the Karnamak-e-Ardashir spoke of the Kurds defeating Ardashir. In the Shahnameh, Ardashir fought with the Kurds before subduing the neighboring areas of Kerman and Sistan, implying that the Kurds were in Fars. But in the Karnamak, Ardashir fought with the Kurds of the land of Masi, Sadeq Hedayat, the translator, asserted was synonymous with Madi, a region around what later became West Azerbaijan province of Iran. John Limbert added a possibility that the Kurds of Fars were not actual Kurds but extinct Iranian tribes who spoke non-Persian dialects, but that it was still likely they were actual Kurds. Ibn Balkhi claimed that the Shabankara of eastern Fars were distinct from the other Kurds. Despite claiming descent from Manuchehr, the Shabankara were thought to have been descendants of Daylamites or of some of the Kurds who were sent to Fars by Adud od-Dowla. The Shabankara had five tribes, the Ramani, the Ismaili, the Karzuvi, the Masudi, and the Shakani. Most British travellers failed to notice Kurds when they met them. They knew that Marco Polo in 1597 included "Curdistan" among the "eyght Kingdomes" of Persia, locating it "towards the South", but failed to recognize that Fars was not Kurdistan and that Marco Polo was only describing the Shabankara Kurds of Fars, who were later moved to Khorasan by Shah Abbas. There was a Kurdish tribe named Shabankara in Kermanshah province, which alongside the Sanjabi, were Yarsanis and protected the Iranian border against the Ottomans.

The Kuch and Baluch were two closely related nations often mentioned together. The Shahnameh claimed that the Kuch and Baluch formed a part of the armies of Keykavus and Keykhosrow. The Kuch and Baluch were known for their cockscomb crests and not fearing anyone. The Shahnameh later talked about how the Baloch laid waste to the Persian Empire, causing Nushirwan Khosrow to surround their mountains with his troops, and ordered every Baloch to be killed. However, they were not fully exterminated as there was some Baloch in his army. Al-Bilizuri, Al-Tabari, Masudi, and Istakhri, mentioned the Kuch and Baluch, with the first two only mentioning the Kuch. The Persian narrative claimed that the Qufs were the Kuch but their name was Arabized after the Islamic conquest, and that the Kuch of the mountains and the Baluch of the desert were commonly mentioned jointly as Kuch and Baluch. Both the Arab and Persian narratives described the Baloch as better behaved than the Kuch, and that there was not a single Kuch who did not engage in raiding and pillaging their neighbors. Idrisi claimed that the Kuch Mountains were inhabited by a savage race known as the Kuch, who were Kurds, while the Baluch lived to the north, and some to the west of the Kuch. Yakut al Hamawi also linked the Kuch to the Kurds, and quoted an Arabic poem: "What wild regions have we traversed, inhabited by Jatts (Zuts), Kurds, and savage Qufs!" He then claimed that the Kuch never had a religion, whether pagan or Islam, but that they slightly respected Ali only because their neighbors did so. He then claimed that the Kuch would never change and that it was better to exterminate them. Out of the Kuch and Baluch, the Baluch were initially the most terrible of the two tribes, but were destroyed by Adad ud-Dawla, who also killed many Kuch. The Baluch closely resembled the Kurds and lived between Fars and Kirman. Mu'izz ud-Dawla Dailami, who died in 856, was the uncle of Adad ud-dawla and had come into collision with the wild tribes of Kirman, called by some Kurds and by others Koch and Baloch. He lost his left hand and several fingers of the right in conflict with them. The full relationship of the Kuch and Baluch was unknown, with the groups sometimes being considered one people and sometimes separate.

The earliest historical reference to the Baloch was the 9th century Shahrstanha-ye Iran [The Cities of Iran], written in Pahlavi. The text identified the Baloch as one of the seven mountain people of Iran, along with the Kurds, both of whom sought refuge in the mountains during the tyranny of Zahhak. All mountain groups were collectively known as "Kufiyar". According to Herzfeld, in Ekofaja, the term "Kufaj" originated from "Kufah", meaning "mountain", and was used during the Achaemenid period for mountain-dwelling communities, such as Kurds and Baloch. In the Kurdish language, "Kef" meant "mountain", bearing similarity to "Kufaj". The Kuch and Baluch were sometimes referred to as Kufj and Baluj or Qufs and Balus due to the Arabic alphabet. The Baloch were traditionally recognized as mountain dwellers. In Mara'at al-Balad, E'temad al-Sultane noted that Mansur Seyyed Sajjadi claimed that the Kuch were remnants of Kurdish groups who assimilated among the people of Balochistan, establishing a lasting presence in the region after centuries of migration. Linguistic evidence supported the claim of shared ancestry between the Baloch and Kurdish languages. There was also evidence that as the Baloch migrated from northwestern Iran to southeastern Iran, remnants of their language persisted in the central desert regions. Furthermore, the there was much shared vocabulary between the Balochi and Kurdish languages that suggested a historical connection between the people.

Masudi had even mentioned the tale of Zahhak being defeated by Kaveh the Blacksmith as the origin story of the Kurds. Due to the significance of the tale of Kaveh in Kurdish and Iranian mythology, there were debates on whether Zahhak embodied a purely mythical figure, a historical persona, or whether he was an amalgamation of both. In the Shahnameh, after being kissed on the shoulders by Ahriman, Zahhak grew snakes on his shoulders, and Ahriman told Zahhak that the snakes needed stew made from two humans every day or else they would eat him. Each day, Zahhak's agents seized two men and executed them to turn their brains into stew for the snakes. Two men, called Armayel and Garmayel, sought to rescue people from being executed, and learned to cook and eventually became Zahhak's personal chefs. Each day when they were given the two men, Armayel and Garmayel saved one of men by sending him off to the mountains, and substituted his brain with that of a sheep. Sharafkhan Bidlisi and Mastoureh Ardalan also mentioned it. When Kaveh emerged, the Kurds and all other victims of Zahhak rebelled, ending Zahhak's tyranny. There was a ceramic bowl, originating from the 12th to 13th century and later modified in the 20th century, depicted Zahhak with serpents emerging from his shoulders, believed to have been crafted in the Garrus District. Darwish Nowruz Sorani, a Yarsani saint, aligned himself with the spirit of Fereydun, Kaveh, and the legacy of Zahhak. Shah Veysqoli, another Yarsani saint and successor of Sultan Sahak, had famous poem where he said "I am of Kurdish lineage, I am of Kurdish lineage; my father was Kurdish, I am of Kurdish lineage; I am the same lion who with my sword; shattered the ranks of Zahhak's army." James Morier (15 August 1782 - 19 March 1849) visited Mount Damavand in 1812, and documented that on August 31, the inhabitants of the region, despite not being Kurds, joyously gathered on Mount Damavand to celebrate "Jashn-e Kurdi" (the Kurdish Holiday), where they commemorated the capture of Zahhak on Mount Damavand by Fereydoun and the subsequent freedom of the Kurds.

The Daylam region and the Alborz mountains was present in both Balochi and Kurdish oral traditions and mythologies. Hamzeh Isfahani labelled the Dailamites as "Kurds of Tabarestan". Hasan ibn Muhammad Qomi documented when the Kurds of Tabarestan or the Dailam faction attacked Saveh and its environs. Similarly, Homeiri identified the inhabitants of Kelar in Tabarestan as Dailamite Kurds. In a poem composed in 965, the Arab poet Mutanabbi referred to a Dailamite ruler, Sallarid, as Vehsudan ibn Muhammad al-Kurdi. Historians stated that it was plausible to propose that the similarities between the Kurds and the Dailamites stemmed from the Medes, where they coexisted under a unified governance and a shared language over an extensive period, facilitating cultural affinities.

Hussain Kurd, a respected Safavid military commander who fought in India against Akbar for seven years, returning to Iran as a hero. According to Haji Amir Khan, chief of the Kurds of Sarhad, Hussain Kurd killed a man in a court over a dispute about a chair, which caused Shah Abbas I to exile him, his brather Otalan, and other members of the Qalkhani tribe with their wives and children. The Kurds were based on an elevated plateau, where with the support of neighboring Baloch tribes, could have launched raids in every direction. The Kurds were led by a Hakem, who was more powerful than a Sardar. However, the Kurds were also led by a Sardar after the Iranian government banned the use of Hakem. After the death of Nadir Shah, The tribes rapidly grew and had developed more clans. George Curzon stated that "Captain Jennings found Serhad to be inhabited by Baluch, Kurd, and Brahui tribes. All were Sunnis, all detested the Persians, all subsisted upon rapine; and the Persian authority amounted to little more than a prudent recognition of local chieftains and an occasional armed expedition for the collection of revenue. In 1893, Sykes noted that "raids, rebellions, and blood feuds have depopulated it, even the orchards having been cut down for fuel. Balochistan was handed over to Iran in 1924 by the British but did not become under Iranian control until 1935 due to Baloch uprisings. In the following period, the solidarity Baloch of Balochistan and Kurds of Kurdistan, with the Baloch and Kurds staunchly supporting each other against the Iranian government in the 20th century.

Baloch and Kurds claimed descent from the Medes. Their folklore also made mentions of the Alborz mountains, and Balochi Kurdish were only languages in which the median word "borz" were which meant "high". Both folklores claimed that their ancestors belonged to the same tribes. However, the general claim they had common ancestors and split after the migrations. DNA samples of Baloch and Kurds in the 2010s confirmed a relation.

The most argued hypothesis on the localization of the ethnic territory of the Kurds was D.N. Mackenzie's theory, proposed in the early 1960s. It regarded the common phonetic isoglosses shared by Baloch, Persian, and Kurdish. D.N. Mackenzie proposed the creation of Balochi-Persian-Kurdish, which would have been a branch of the Northwestern Iranian languages. However, only Balochi and Kurdish classified as Northwestern Iranian languages, while Persian was classified as Southwestern Iranian. Other Northwestern Iranian languages close to Balochi and Kurdish the Semnani languages and the Caspian languages.

== Kurdgalnamek ==
=== Background ===
The Kurdgalnamek (Kurdish: Kurdgalnamek, کوردگالنامەک; Balochi: کوردگالنامک) was a book written in 1659 by Axwend Mihemed Salih Zengene Beluç, a minister in the court of Mir Ahmad Khan I of Kalat, and was a crucial link between the Kurds and Baloch. The Kurdgalnamek was largely historical but also included mythological narratives such as those from the Shahnameh. The Kurdgalnamek traced the origins, migrations, and interrelations of various Kurdish tribes, and it included accounts connecting the Kurds to the Baloch. Axwend Mihemed Salih Zengene Beluç presented himself as a Baloch from the Kurdish Zangana tribe. It also preserved cultural details about Baloch religion, customs, language, and tribal organization.

=== History ===
According to the Kurdgalnamek, the Kurds were direct descendants of the Medes, who ultimately descended from Japheth. The Medes were divided into the western branch (proto-Kurds) and eastern branch (proto-Baloch). The eastern branch emerged after the migration of western Median tribes eastwards which divided them over generations. The Median ruler was Keyqubad, who was close to the Pishdadians. Afrasiyab did not recognize Keyqubad nor his authority, leading to Keyqubad declaring war on Afrasiyab, defeating him and conquering his kingdom of Turan (Central Asia) in the 9th century BCE, around 854. The Kurdish tribal regiments loyal to the Median state left the Zagros Mountains eastwards to Turan (Central Asia), Turan (Kalat), Kirman, Makran, and Zabulistan, consolidating Median rule over the regions where they settled. Later, under Khosrow I, the Baloch were targeted for being Mazdaki, with over 200,000 Baloch being massacred and more being forced to flee to the southeast. The regions corresponded with what later became Balochistan, in southeast Iran, west Pakistan, and southwest Afghanistan. After covering the migration of Kurds from Kurdistan to Balochistan and the consolidation of Baloch identity, the Kurdgalnamek then covered the history of the Baloch under the Achaemenid, Greek, Parthian, Sasanian, and Islamic periods which came afterwards. There were three regiments in the army of Keyqubad, one led by the Adragani tribe, one led by the Birakhoyi tribe, and one led by the Zangana tribe. The three regiments were each led by one tribe, although each regiment did include other smaller tribes. The Birakhoyi and the Zangana were both branches of the Bûdî tribe, named after its forefather Bûd. The Zangana were named after their forefather Zengan. The Edregani was a branch of the Estruşatî tribe named after its forefather Estruşat, with the other two branches being Mamili and Kirmani which also were in the regiments. Several other smaller tribes were among the regiments, such as Îşkene, Dirmenî, Sebahî, Sincawî, Seffarî, Xanî, Xelî, Başarî, Şamarî, Sencanî, Şîrkibarî, Mûtlisanî, Bazîcanî, Sûranî, Siryanî, Babînî, Makkî, Tûkanî, Askanî, Selahî, Şînwanî, Gurcîn, Celabûk, Hûtkarî, Kukanî, Şekkanî, Nidamanî, Şûn, Mûcaranî, Mûrrayî, Qencanî, Kîşanî, Şembed, Cadî, Xawerî, Kidek, Cemmak, Sûhatî, Dînûrî, Cesfanî, Sûyanî, Hesranî, Dîganî, Gucarî, Şahûlî, Etwanî, Şembiyanî, Salmanî, Ûnîzî, Şahekî, Bîwanî, Sarûlî, Semedînî, Îlzarî, and Kirma. The Median regiments who led the conquests of Turan, Makran, and Zabulistan. Who remained in the Zagros."Zangana/Birakhoyi The Brahui were the Birakhoyi, the Narohi were the Zangana.

== Political ==
Baloch and Kurds established solidarity after the division of Balochistan and Kurdistan across different countries, as well as being stateless. While both groups followed Islam, their national movements were largely secular. secularism in Balochistan was significant in the national movement. The Kurdish movement was also known for secularism. Baloch and Kurds, along with Pashtuns, often faced alienation from the Islamic world, as the separatist movements in Balochistan, Kurdistan, and Pashtunkhwa aimed at gaining independence from predominantly Muslim states. Baloch nationalists claimed that the international community was silent on Balochistan, and that Kurds had been the only ones who supported the Baloch.

The Khorasani Baloch and Khorasani Kurds live in close proximities, and both were largely deported there by various Iranian dynasties. Baloch and Kurds also formed minority populations in Turkmenistan. In Soviet Turkmenistan, the Baloch and Kurds both had their own newspapers and textbooks, and both of their languages were written in the Latin script. However, after Turkmen independence, Saparmurat Niyazov repressed minorities in his attempt to promote Turkmen culture. Mainly the Baloch were forbidden from teaching their language and culture in schools.

In the 1960s, amid unrest in Kurdistan and an insurgency in Balochistan, there was an agreement signed between Pakistan, Iran, and Turkey, known as the Regional Cooperation for Development in 1964. The alliance had its rationale in the shared desire to suppress the Baloch and Kurdish insurgencies.

Women played a big role in both the Kurdish and Baloch movements. Following a wave of Baloch women-led protests against the Pakistani government, a group of Kurdish women sent a message titled "from Rojava to all the women and people of Balochistan" in which they said "until the end, we stand with you and we will not let go of each other". Baloch groups showed overwhelming support for the 2017 Kurdish referendum. Kurds who fled Saddam Hussein and went to Pakistan were often mistreated by Pakistani authorities alongside the Baloch. There was a very notable solidarity between Kurds and Baloch in Iran. They often protested together, chanting Baloch and Kurds are thirsty for the blood of the leader." Most prisoners in the Islamic Republic of Iran were Kurds and Baloch. The Islamic Republic commonly accused Israel and the United States are active in both the Baloch and Kurdish movements. Turkey, while arresting Kurdish activists, had also arrested Baloch activists and extradited them to Pakistan and Iran.

== Militant ==
Allah Nazar Baloch of the BLF supported Kurdish independence. In 2018, there were also reports of cooperation between BLA and Syria-based PKK militants, and plans to form a Baloch-Kurdish front in Afghanistan to attack Turkish and Pakistani interests, and to fund separatists in Kurdistan and Balochistan.

Mahal Baloch, a BLA female suicide bomber in the August 2024 Balochistan attacks, had adopted the assumed name "Zilan Kurd" after Zeynep Kınacı. On September 3, 2024, armed Kurdish pro-PKK militants entered Şişli Plaza in Istanbul, burning, ransacking, and destroying Turkish government property. They claimed that the attack was provoked by the imprisonment of Abdullah Öcalan, and dedicated the attack to Mahal Baloch, and Rizwan Baloch.

== See also ==
- Baloch
- Kurds
