= Knyaz Hasanov =

Armenian-Kurdish politician

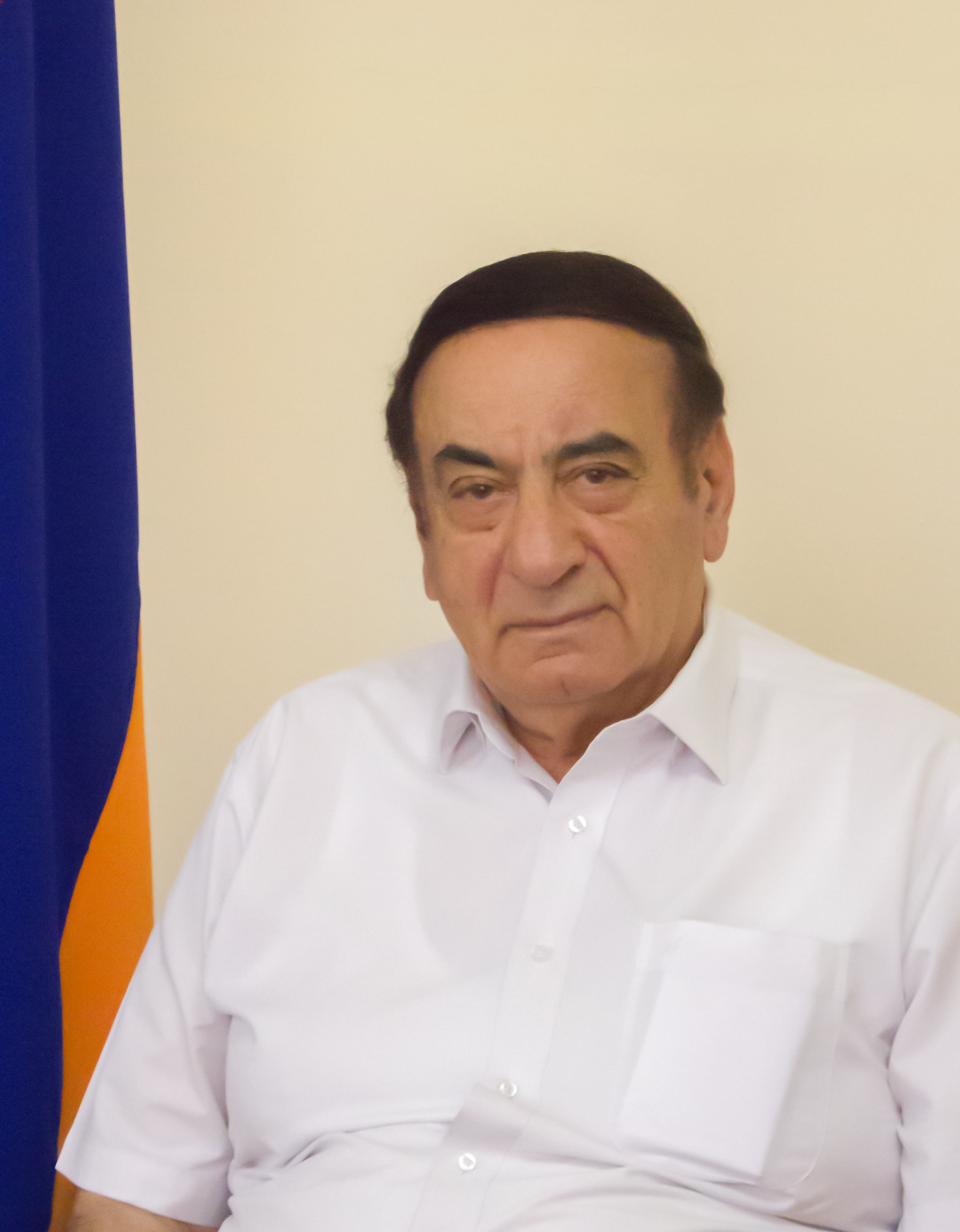

Member of the Armenian Parliament
- Incumbent
- Assumed office April 2, 2017
- Parliamentary group: My Step Alliance; Civil Contract

Personal details
- Born: 17 January 1945 (age 81) Astkhaberd, Kotayk Province, Armenian SSR, USSR
- Citizenship: Armenian

Knyaz Hamidi Hasanov (born 17 January 1945) is an Armenian politician and a member of the Armenian Parliament for the Civil Contract Party.

== Early life and education ==
Kurdish Armenian Knyaz Hasanov was born on 17 January 1945 in the village Astkhaberd in the province of Kotayk of Armenia. He attended the Marx–Engels–Lenin Institute in Moscow, from which he graduated in political economy in 1968. He then followed up on his studies and in 1969 he graduated in from the Faculty of Horticulture at the Armenian Agricultural Institute.

== Professional career ==
Following his graduation he entered the public administration and served in the executive committee of the Abovyan District Council from 1970 to 1973. In 1973 he became the director of Cinema Network in Abovyan, a post he kept until 1997. In 1977 he also assumed as the director of the Kotayk Cinema Network, as what he served until 2014. Besides he serves the chief editor of the monthly Zagros since 2007.

== Political career ==
Hasanov is a leader of the Kurdish community in Armenia and since 1995 a member of the NGO Committee of Kurdistan. He advocates for a stronger cooperation of the Kurds and the Armenians in their politics regarding the Turkish government. In the Parliamentary Elections of 2017, he was elected to the Armenian Parliament as a member for the Kurdish minority. He was re-elected in the Parliamentary Elections of 2021. As the eldest member of the parliament in both 2017 and 2020, he chaired the new parliament until a new president was elected.

== Personal life ==
Knyaz Hasanov is married and the father of two children.
