= Kalateh-ye Morrehi =

Village in Razavi Khorasan province, Iran

Kalateh-ye Morrehi Persian: كلاته مره اي
- Village
- Location within Iran
- Coordinates: 36°14′22″N 61°10′51″E
- Country: Iran
- Province: Razavi Khorasan
- County: Sarakhs
- District: Central
- Rural District: Tajan

Population (2016)
  - Total: 340
- Time zone: UTC+3:30 (IRST)

Kalateh-ye Morrehi (Persian: كلاته مره اي) (Note: Also romanized as Kalāteh-ye Morrehī) is a village in Tajan Rural District of the Central District in Sarakhs County, Razavi Khorasan province, Iran.

== Demographics ==
=== Population ===
At the time of the 2006 National Census, the village's population was 324 in 70 households. The following census in 2011 counted 291 people in 78 households. The 2016 census measured the population of the village as 340 people in 97 households.
