= Tajan Rural District =

Rural district in Razavi Khorasan province, Iran

Tajan Rural District Persian: دهستان تجن
- Rural District
- Location within Iran
- Coordinates: 36°16′N 61°05′E
- Country: Iran
- Province: Razavi Khorasan
- County: Sarakhs
- District: Central
- Established: 1986
- Capital: Sangar

Population (2016)
  - Total: 13,197
- Time zone: UTC+3:30 (IRST)

Tajan Rural District (Persian: دهستان تجن) is in the Central District of Sarakhs County, Razavi Khorasan province, Iran. Its capital is the village of Sangar.

== Demographics ==
=== Population ===
At the time of the 2006 National Census, the rural district's population was 13,136 in 2,837 households. There were 13,439 inhabitants in 3,385 households at the following census of 2011. The 2016 census measured the population of the rural district as 13,197 in 3,576 households. The most populous of its 21 villages was Shir Tappeh, with 2,643 people.

=== Other villages in the rural district ===
- Asefabad
- Dowlatabad
- Kachuli
- Kalateh-ye Morrehi
- Nowruzabad
- Qaleh Qassab
- Qasemabad
- Qush-e Azim
- Qush-e Sarbuzi
- Samadabad
