= Eslam Qaleh, Mashhad =

Eslam Qaleh اسلام قلعه
- Village
- Location within Iran
- Coordinates: 35°52′33″N 59°25′28″E
- Country: Iran
- Province: Razavi Khorasan
- County: Mashhad
- Bakhsh: Ahmadabad
- Rural District: Piveh Zhan

Population (2006)
  - Total: 453
- Time zone: UTC+3:30 (IRST)
  - Summer (DST): UTC+4:30 (IRDT)

Eslam Qaleh (Persian: اسلام قلعه, also Romanized as Eslām Qal’eh; also known as Kāfar Qal‘eh and Kāfir Qal‘eh) is a village in Piveh Zhan Rural District, Ahmadabad District, Mashhad County, Razavi Khorasan Province, Iran. At the 2006 census, its population was 453, in 131 families.
