= Sarakhs =

City in Razavi Khorasan province, Iran

Sarakhs Persian: سرخس
- City
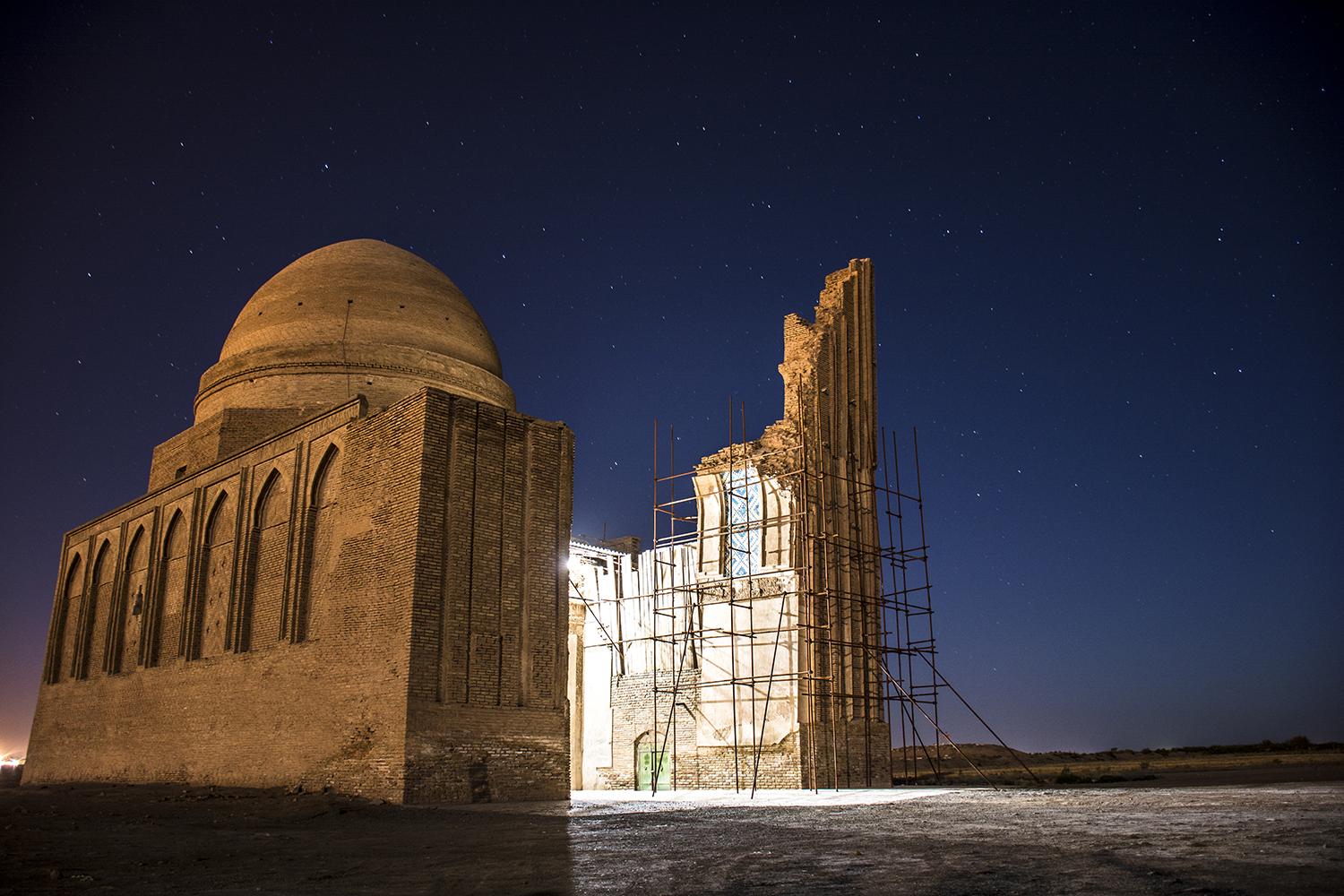

- Location within Iran
- Coordinates: 36°32′33″N 61°09′32″E
- Country: Iran
- Province: Razavi Khorasan
- County: Sarakhs
- District: Central

Population (2016)
  - Total: 42,179
- Time zone: UTC+3:30 (IRST)

Sarakhs (Persian: سرخس) (Note: Also romanized as Saraxs and Serakhs) is a city in the Central District of Sarakhs County, Razavi Khorasan province, Iran, serving as capital of both the county and the district. Sarakhs was once a stopping point along the Silk Road, and in its 11th century heyday had many libraries. Much of the original city site is now just across the border at Serakhs in Turkmenistan.

== History ==
=== Pre-Islamic ===
Sarakhs lies in the historical region of Greater Khorasan, an area that was significant under Parthian and Sassanian rule. According to Ferdowsi's Shahnameh the town has existed since the Afrasiab period and was named for its builder, Sarakhs, son of Godarz, by Keykavus.

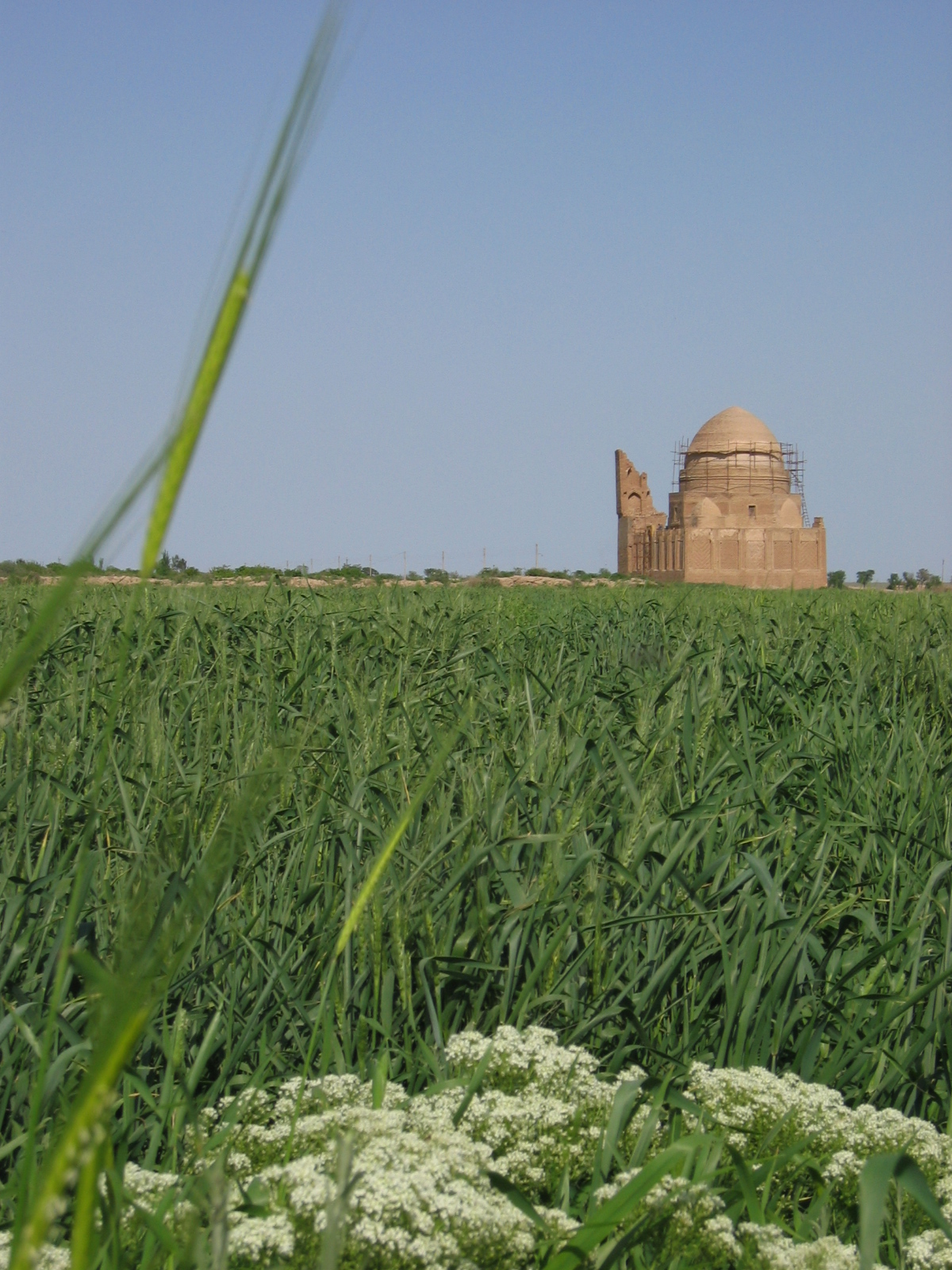
Loghman Baba mausoleum, Sarakhs, built in 1356 and recently partially restored.

The surrounding oasis has been inhabited since 2nd millennium BCE and Turkmen historians consider the city to have been founded in 507 BCE. Although this is considered to be a somewhat arbitrary choice of date, the section of the city called Sarahs that's now on the Turkmenistan side of the border, duly celebrated its 2500th anniversary in 1993.

More than 100 bullae have been found in Aq Tepe, southern Turkmenistan between 1963 and 1978. These bullaes are dated between 580-650 AD, and show the presence of the Sasanian administration in Merv, Sarakhs and Abiward until the Arab arrival. The site was excavated by A.G. Gubaev, although most of them disappeared.

Ancient Sarakhs was inhabited by the Turanians until the Islamic conquest in the 7th century, when it temporarily became a hub for Sassanian refugees fleeing to China.

=== Prominence during the Islamic Golden Age ===
Following the first Arab conquests beginning in 642, Sarakhs retained its importance after the spread of Islam into Central Asia and Greater Khorasan. As muslim elites consolidated power over Persia, established urban centers and caravan routes were integrated into the new polity. Early public gathering places such as ribats and caravanserai have also been documented since the Umayyad period.

Under the Abbasids, Sarakhs saw the establishment of local libraries and madrasas. Being situated along the Silk Road, the city became a center for Greek, Persian and Sanskrit academia which were rendered into Arabic.

By the mid ninth century, Sarakhs was briefly conquered by the Saffarids of Persia and later the Samanids of Transoxiana. It was during this time when the commercial hub matured into a major city within Khorasan, and many scholars and scientists were invited to immigrate. One prominent figure who studied in Sarakhs was Abu Bakr al-Sarakhsi, a renowned Hanafi jurist whose works on Islamic jurisprudence were widely studied and served as standardised text.

The Samanid prominence in the area saw the rise of aggressive Islamisation. Starting in 893, Ismail Samani began a process of converting the Nestorian churches in Transoxiana and Khorasan into mosques. The same year, the Bukhara slave trade was introduced to Sarakhs, becoming the main source of income and trade of the Samanids until the Mongol conquest.

Slavery under the Samanids were mostly mamluk Turkmen who were subject to indentured military servitude under the name of ghilmen. In the late tenth century, a former ghilman called Alp Tigin became the governor of Khorasan, and in 962, he conquered neighboring Ghazna and declared independence. The Samanid domains were eventually split up between the Ghaznavids, who gained Khorasan, and the Karakhanids, who received Transoxiana.

==== Seljuk conquest ====
Beginning in around 1034, the Oghuz Turks began rapidly expanding across the Karakum Desert under the Seljuk dynasty. In 1038, after the Ghaznavid sultan Mahmhud returned from India, Seljuk forces captured Sarakhs as a part of the Seljuk-Ghaznavid Wars. This victory later paved the way for the famous Battle of Dandanaqan.

During the Seljuk era, Sarakhs housed a famous school of architects, as well as a mausoleum dedicated to the 11th-century Sufi Abul Fazl, popularly known as Sarakhs Baba. In 1089, the mausoleum of Yarta Gumbez was built 8 km south of the city. It is believed to be the burial place of Sheikh Ahmed Al Hadi.

The region retains the tombs of three major 11th-century figures, two on the Turkmenistan side of today's border (those of Abul Fazl, and the 1089 Yarty Gumbez, mausoleum of Sheikh Ahmed Al Khady) and the impressive Tomb of Baba Loghman on the Iranian side. All were significantly rebuilt in the mid-19th century by the order of Naser al-Din Shah Qajar of the Qajar dynasty, who also rebuilt the current Iranian-side town.

Beginning in the early twelfth century, Persia and Khorasan would come under the rule of the Shahs of Khwarazm, and briefly under the Chinese Western Liao dynasty in 1181.

=== Mongolian hegemony ===
In 1221, as part of their sweeping invasion of Khwarazmian Empire, The Mongols captured major centers such as Samarkand, Bukhara, and Merv. Sarakhs, being an important city in Khorasan, experienced widespread devastation and was plundered and destroyed. The loss of life and scattering of the population resulted in the temporary cease of the city's existence. Numerous scholarly texts and manuscripts were burned and lost to time.

During the Pax Mongolica, Sarakhs was rebuilt and commerce continued under the Ilkhanate, although to a lesser extent. The city later came under the rule of the Timurids.

In 1458, Persia at war with Jahan Shah of Kara Koyunlu, who invaded and devastated the empire. Khorasan and Afghanistan were returned to Persia, but the Turkmens ravaged the territory while leaving. During the Second Timurid Civil War, the Timurid Kingdom of Samarkand fought the Kingdoms of Merv and Khorasan at Sarakhs.

=== Modern period ===
In 1881, the Treaty of Akhal redrew the Iranian border with Russia and ran through the city of Sarakhs. As a result, the city was split into two, with its counterpart being Sarahs in modern Turkmenistan.

== Demographics ==
=== Population ===
At the time of the 2006 National Census, the city's population was 33,571 in 8,066 households. The following census in 2011 counted 37,162 people in 9,984 households. The 2016 census measured the population of the city as 42,179 people in 11,812 households.

== Geography ==
=== Location ===
Sarakhs city, with an area of more than 5,000 square kilometers, is located in the northeast of Khorasan Razavi province, next to the border between Iran and Turkmenistan, 180 kilometers east of Mashhad. It is located approximately between the meridians 30 to 60 and 15 to 61 degrees east and between the two orbits 36 and 36 to 40 degrees north. The natural boundary of the region to the south is determined by the Kashfarud River, the eastern boundary by the Tajan River (from the confluence of the Hariroud River and the Kashfar River), and the natural western and southwestern boundaries by the last extensions of the Kopeh Dagh heights. It is bounded on the north and east by Turkmenistan, on the west by the city of Mashhad, and on the south by the city of Torbat-e Jam.

=== Climate ===
Sarakhs has a hot semi-arid climate (BSh) in the Köppen climate classification. The city's weather is cold in winter, warm and dry in summer thanks to the influence of the Karakum Desert. On July 7, 2021, the record high temperature of 48.7 °C (119.7 °F) was registered.

The weather in Sarakhs has been mild and dry in the past With the expansion of irrigated agriculture and the intake of “Dousti dam”. And now, during the summer months, even in spring, the maximum temperature is 50 degrees above zero and the lowest in winter is 15 degrees below zero.

On February 15, 2024, 32.2 °C was reached, beating the previous monthly record for the month of 2016 by +0.2 °C (with data recorded since 1989).

Climate data for Sarakhs (1991–2020)
Month	Jan	Feb	Mar	Apr	May	Jun	Jul	Aug	Sep	Oct	Nov	Dec	Year
Record high °C (°F)	26.8 (80.2)	32.2 (90.0)	41.6 (106.9)	43.4 (110.1)	45.1 (113.2)	47.2 (117.0)	48.7 (119.7)	47.6 (117.7)	45.2 (113.4)	43.0 (109.4)	36.4 (97.5)	34.6 (94.3)	48.7 (119.7)
Mean daily maximum °C (°F)	11.1 (52.0)	13.0 (55.4)	18.7 (65.7)	25.5 (77.9)	32.4 (90.3)	37.2 (99.0)	38.9 (102.0)	37.3 (99.1)	32.7 (90.9)	26.1 (79.0)	17.9 (64.2)	12.4 (54.3)	25.3 (77.5)
Daily mean °C (°F)	5.3 (41.5)	7.0 (44.6)	12.1 (53.8)	18.3 (64.9)	24.7 (76.5)	29.9 (85.8)	31.5 (88.7)	29.4 (84.9)	24.2 (75.6)	17.9 (64.2)	10.8 (51.4)	6.4 (43.5)	18.1 (64.6)
Mean daily minimum °C (°F)	1.0 (33.8)	2.4 (36.3)	6.9 (44.4)	12.0 (53.6)	17.0 (62.6)	21.4 (70.5)	23.1 (73.6)	20.9 (69.6)	15.9 (60.6)	10.4 (50.7)	5.5 (41.9)	2.2 (36.0)	11.6 (52.9)
Record low °C (°F)	−22.4 (−8.3)	−18.0 (−0.4)	−6.6 (20.1)	−0.4 (31.3)	3.2 (37.8)	11.4 (52.5)	13.8 (56.8)	11.0 (51.8)	6.0 (42.8)	−3.6 (25.5)	−9.8 (14.4)	−15.8 (3.6)	−22.4 (−8.3)
Average precipitation mm (inches)	28.4 (1.12)	35.9 (1.41)	45.2 (1.78)	29.5 (1.16)	14.0 (0.55)	1.2 (0.05)	0.3 (0.01)	0.0 (0.0)	0.8 (0.03)	6.2 (0.24)	16.5 (0.65)	19.5 (0.77)	197.5 (7.78)
Average precipitation days (≥ 1.0 mm)	5.3	5.8	6.4	4.2	2.4	0.4	0.1	0.0	0.1	1.0	3.1	3.5	32.3
Average relative humidity (%)	70	68	63	54	40	28	27	26	30	41	59	70	48
Average dew point °C (°F)	−0.4 (31.3)	0.8 (33.4)	4.5 (40.1)	7.7 (45.9)	8.9 (48.0)	8.8 (47.8)	9.7 (49.5)	7.5 (45.5)	4.8 (40.6)	3.2 (37.8)	2.4 (36.3)	0.7 (33.3)	4.9 (40.8)
Mean monthly sunshine hours	139	145	177	218	300	351	375	363	311	261	175	135	2,950
Source 1: NOAA
Source 2: Ogimet (records)

== Industries and mines ==
The most important industries in this city are the industries related to the extraction, refining and storage of gas, oil and sulfur resources which is rich. Aq Darband coal mine, which is now inactive after falling and killing and injuring several workers. The sand mines in the area of Qush-e Azim are also operating.

== Landmarks ==
The main historical site of Sarakhs is the partly restored Loghman Baba mausoleum in a field just north of the town. It was built in 1356 AD (757 AH).

In Sarakhs district within 80 km of Sarakhs town are:

- Bazangan lake
- Mazdavand cave and reservoir
- Iran–Turkmenistan Friendship Dam
- Ribat Sharaf Caravanserai
- Khatun Bridge (five-arched stone bridge between Iran and Turkmenistan)
- Tomb of Baba Loghman
- Sarakhs Special Economic Zone

== Transport ==
More than a century after the early proposals of a cross-border railway at this location, the railways of Iran and Turkmenistan were finally linked here in 1996. A bogie exchange is needed to overcome a break of gauge. This will be supplemented with a quicker SUW 2000 variable gauge axles track gauge changing facility (TSR).
