= Qush Tappeh =

Qush Tappeh (Persian: قوش تپه) may refer to:

- Qush Tappeh, Golestan
- Qush Tappeh, Hamadan
- Qush Tappeh, Markazi
- Qush Tappeh, North Khorasan
