= Baluch Khaneh =

Baluch Khaneh بلوچ خانه
- Village
- Location within Iran
- Coordinates: 35°49′39″N 57°39′46″E
- Country: Iran
- Province: Razavi Khorasan
- County: Sabzevar
- Bakhsh: Rud Ab
- Rural District: Khavashod

Population (2006)
  - Total: 78
- Time zone: UTC+3:30 (IRST)
  - Summer (DST): UTC+4:30 (IRDT)

Baluch Khaneh (Persian: بلوچ خانه, also Romanized as Balūch Khāneh and Balūchkhāneh) is a village in Khavashod Rural District, Rud Ab District, Sabzevar County, Razavi Khorasan Province, Iran. At the 2006 census, its population was 78, in 29 families.

== See also ==
- List of cities, towns and villages in Razavi Khorasan Province
