= Jahandad Khan =

Jahandad or Jehandad Khan may refer to:

- Mir Jehandad Khan (1820–1868), a chief of Tanoli tribe and Nawab of Amb in what is now Pakistan
- Jahandad Khan (cricketer) (born 2003), a Pakistani cricketer
