= Qush-e Azim =

Village in Razavi Khorasan province, Iran

Qush-e Azim Persian: قوش عظيم
- Village
- Location within Iran
- Coordinates: 36°26′43″N 61°08′43″E
- Country: Iran
- Province: Razavi Khorasan
- County: Sarakhs
- District: Central
- Rural District: Tajan

Population (2016)
  - Total: 1,889
- Time zone: UTC+3:30 (IRST)

Qush-e Azim (Persian: قوش عظيم) (Note: Also romanized as Qūsh-e ‘Az̧īm) is a village in Tajan Rural District of the Central District in Sarakhs County, Razavi Khorasan province, Iran.

== Demographics ==
=== Population ===
At the time of the 2006 National Census, the village's population was 1,731 in 369 households. The following census in 2011 counted 1,689 people in 415 households. The 2016 census measured the population of the village as 1,889 people in 503 households.
