= Central District (Sarakhs County) =

District in Razavi Khorasan province, Iran

Central District (Sarakhs County) Persian: بخش مرکزی شهرستان سرخس
- District
- Location within Iran
- Coordinates: 36°20′N 60°47′E
- Country: Iran
- Province: Razavi Khorasan
- County: Sarakhs
- Capital: Sarakhs

Population (2016)
  - Total: 80,710
- Time zone: UTC+3:30 (IRST)

The Central District of Sarakhs County (Persian: بخش مرکزی شهرستان سرخس) is in Razavi Khorasan province, Iran. Its capital is the city of Sarakhs.

== Demographics ==
=== Population ===
At the time of the 2006 National Census, the district's population was 69,404 in 15,867 households. The following census in 2011 counted 74,796 people in 19,615 households. The 2016 census measured the population of the district as 80,710 inhabitants in 22,165 households.

=== Administrative divisions ===
Central District (Sarakhs County) Population
Administrative Divisions	2006	2011	2016
Khangiran RD	6,530	6,829	7,600
Sarakhs RD	16,167	17,366	17,734
Tajan RD	13,136	13,439	13,197
Sarakhs (city)	33,571	37,162	42,179
Total	69,404	74,796	80,710
RD = Rural District
