= Gonbad, Iran =

Gonbad (Persian: گنبد) may refer to:

- Gonbad-e Qabus (city)
- Gonbad-e Sorkh (disambiguation)
- Gonbad, Ajab Shir, East Azerbaijan Province
- Gonbad, Bostanabad, East Azerbaijan Province
- Gonbad, Fars
- Gonbad, Hamadan
- Gonbad, Malayer, Hamadan Province
- Gonbad Chay, Hamadan Province
- Gonbad-e Kabud, Hamadan Province
- Gonbad-e Mahuiyeh, Kerman Province
- Gonbad Ab, Kermanshah Province
- Gonbad, Khuzestan
- Gonbad-e Bala, Kurdistan Province
- Gonbad-e Hajji, Kurdistan Province
- Gonbad, Sistan and Baluchestan
- Gonbad, Khoy, West Azerbaijan Province
- Gonbad, Takab, West Azerbaijan Province
- Gonbad, Urmia, West Azerbaijan Province
- Gonbad-e Molla Isa, West Azerbaijan Province
- Gonbad-e Vila, West Azerbaijan Province
- Gonbad, Zanjan
- Gonbad Rural District, in Hamadan Province
