= Gerdegeh Gol =

Gerdegeh Gol گردگه گل
- Village
- Location within Iran
- Coordinates: 37°09′41″N 45°07′49″E
- Country: Iran
- Province: West Azerbaijan
- County: Oshnavieh
- Bakhsh: Central
- Rural District: Dasht-e Bil

Population (2006)
  - Total: 318
- Time zone: UTC+3:30 (IRST)
  - Summer (DST): UTC+4:30 (IRDT)

Gerdegeh Gol (Persian: گردگه گل; also known as Gerdeh Gol) is a village in Dasht-e Bil Rural District, in the Central District of Oshnavieh County, West Azerbaijan Province, Iran. At the 2006 census, its population was 318, in 64 families.
