= Gonbadan =

Gonbadan (Persian: گنبدان) may refer to:

- Gonbadan, East Azerbaijan
- Gonbadan, Hamadan
- Gonbadan, Kerman

== See also ==
- Gonbad, Iran (disambiguation)
- Do Gonbadan
