= Chehel Asiab =

Chehel Asiab چهل اسياب
- Village
- Country: Iran
- Province: West Azerbaijan
- County: Oshnavieh
- Bakhsh: Central
- Rural District: Dasht-e Bil

Population (2006)
  - Total: 126
- Time zone: UTC+3:30 (IRST)
  - Summer (DST): UTC+4:30 (IRDT)

Chehel Asiab (Persian: چهل اسياب, also Romanized as Chehel Āsīāb) is a village in Dasht-e Bil Rural District, in the Central District of Oshnavieh County, West Azerbaijan Province, Iran. At the 2006 census, its population was 126, in 31 families.
