= Mamadan =

Mamadan مامدان
- Village
- Country: Iran
- Province: West Azerbaijan
- County: Oshnavieh
- Bakhsh: Nalus
- Rural District: Haq

Population (2006)
  - Total: 48
- Time zone: UTC+3:30 (IRST)
  - Summer (DST): UTC+4:30 (IRDT)

Mamadan (Persian: مامدان, also Romanized as Māmadān) is a village in Haq Rural District, Nalus District, Oshnavieh County, West Azerbaijan Province, Iran. At the 2006 census, its population was 48, in 10 families.
