= Alian =

Alian may refer to:

== Places in Iran ==
Alian or Aliyan or Alyan (Persian: عليان) may refer to:

- Alian, Semnan, a village in Semnan Province, Iran
- Alian, Tehran, a village in Tehran Province, Iran
- Alian, West Azerbaijan, a village in West Azerbaijan Province, Iran
- Alian-e Sofla, a village in South Khorasan Province, Iran
- Aliyan Rural District, in Gailan Province, Iran

== Other uses ==
- Ghassan Alian (born 1972), Israeli commander of the IDF Golani Brigade
- Alians, a Shia order
- Alian District, in Taiwan
- Alians (band), a Polish punk-rock, reggae and ska band
