= Agh Bolagh, Oshnavieh =

Village in West Azerbaijan province, Iran

Agh Bolagh Persian: اغبلاغ
- Village
- Location within Iran
- Coordinates: 37°09′56″N 45°06′06″E
- Country: Iran
- Province: West Azerbaijan
- County: Oshnavieh
- District: Central
- Rural District: Dasht-e Bil

Population (2016)
  - Total: 1,295
- Time zone: UTC+3:30 (IRST)

Agh Bolagh (Persian: اغبلاغ) (Note: Also romanized as Āgh Bolāgh; also known as Āgh Bolāq and Āqbolāgh Kānasbī) is a village in, and the capital of, Dasht-e Bil Rural District in the Central District of Oshnavieh County, West Azerbaijan province, Iran. The previous capital of the rural district was the village of Nalivan, now in Oshnavieh-ye Shomali Rural District.

== Demographics ==
=== Population ===
At the time of the 2006 National Census, the village's population was 1,158 in 301 households. The following census in 2011 counted 1,274 people in 341 households. The 2016 census measured the population of the village as 1,295 people in 357 households. It was the most populous village in its rural district.
