= Batrian =

Batrian بطريان
- Village
- Location within Iran
- Coordinates: 36°59′09″N 45°04′33″E
- Country: Iran
- Province: West Azerbaijan
- County: Oshnavieh
- Bakhsh: Nalus
- Rural District: Haq

Population (2006)
  - Total: 112
- Time zone: UTC+3:30 (IRST)
  - Summer (DST): UTC+4:30 (IRDT)

Batrian (Persian: بطريان, also Romanized as Baţrīān) is a village in Haq Rural District, Nalus District, Oshnavieh County, West Azerbaijan Province, Iran. At the 2006 census, its population was 112, in 16 families.
