= Pushabad =

Pushabad پوش اباد
- Village
- Location within Iran
- Coordinates: 37°00′13″N 45°05′46″E
- Country: Iran
- Province: West Azerbaijan
- County: Oshnavieh
- Bakhsh: Nalus
- Rural District: Haq

Population (2006)
  - Total: 277
- Time zone: UTC+3:30 (IRST)
  - Summer (DST): UTC+4:30 (IRDT)

Pushabad (Persian: پوش اباد, also Romanized as Pūshābād) is a village in Haq Rural District, Nalus District, Oshnavieh County, West Azerbaijan Province, Iran. At the 2006 census, its population was 277, in 48 families.
