= Shiveh Berow =

Shiveh Berow شيوه برو
- Village
- Location within Iran
- Coordinates: 37°09′24″N 45°02′06″E
- Country: Iran
- Province: West Azerbaijan
- County: Oshnavieh
- Bakhsh: Central
- Rural District: Dasht-e Bil

Population (2006)
  - Total: 396
- Time zone: UTC+3:30 (IRST)
  - Summer (DST): UTC+4:30 (IRDT)

Shiveh Berow (Persian: شيوه برو, also Romanized as Shīveh Berow) is a village in Dasht-e Bil Rural District, in the Central District of Oshnavieh County, West Azerbaijan Province, Iran. At the 2006 census, its population was 396, in 74 families.
