= Tazhandareh =

Tazhandareh تاژان دره
- Village
- Location within Iran
- Coordinates: 36°58′59″N 45°05′01″E
- Country: Iran
- Province: West Azerbaijan
- County: Oshnavieh
- Bakhsh: Nalus
- Rural District: Haq

Population (2006)
  - Total: 298
- Time zone: UTC+3:30 (IRST)
  - Summer (DST): UTC+4:30 (IRDT)

Tazhandareh (Persian: تاژان دره, also Romanized as Tāzhāndareh) is a village in Haq Rural District, Nalus District, Oshnavieh County, West Azerbaijan Province, Iran. At the 2006 census, its population was 298, in 49 families.
