= Gol Mavaran =

Gol Mavaran گل ماوران
- Village
- Location within Iran
- Coordinates: 37°13′24″N 45°07′44″E
- Country: Iran
- Province: West Azerbaijan
- County: Oshnavieh
- Bakhsh: Central
- Rural District: Dasht-e Bil

Population (2006)
  - Total: 151
- Time zone: UTC+3:30 (IRST)
  - Summer (DST): UTC+4:30 (IRDT)

Gol Mavaran (Persian: گل ماوران, also Romanized as Gol Māvarān) is a village in Dasht-e Bil Rural District, in the Central District of Oshnavieh County, West Azerbaijan Province, Iran. At the 2006 census, its population was 151, in 26 families.
