= Eyn ol Rrum =

Eyn ol Rrum عين الروم
- Village
- Location within Iran
- Coordinates: 37°10′36″N 45°08′02″E
- Country: Iran
- Province: West Azerbaijan
- County: Oshnavieh
- Bakhsh: Central
- Rural District: Dasht-e Bil

Population (2006)
  - Total: 105
- Time zone: UTC+3:30 (IRST)
  - Summer (DST): UTC+4:30 (IRDT)

Eyn ol Rrum (Persian: عين الروم, also Romanized as ‘Eyn ol Rrūm and ‘Eyn or Rūm) is a village in Dasht-e Bil Rural District, in the Central District of Oshnavieh County, West Azerbaijan Province, Iran. At the 2006 census, its population was 105, in 25 families.
