= Bab-e Khaledabad =

Bab-e Khaledabad باب خالداباد
- Village
- Location within Iran
- Coordinates: 36°56′37″N 45°06′25″E
- Country: Iran
- Province: West Azerbaijan
- County: Oshnavieh
- Bakhsh: Nalus
- Rural District: Haq

Population (2006)
  - Total: 338
- Time zone: UTC+3:30 (IRST)
  - Summer (DST): UTC+4:30 (IRDT)

Bab-e Khaledabad (Persian: باب خالداباد, also Romanized as Bāb-e Khāledābād) is a village in Haq Rural District, Nalus District, Oshnavieh County, West Azerbaijan Province, Iran. At the 2006 census, its population was 338, in 50 families.
