= Khvoresht =

Khvoresht خورشت
- Village
- Location within Iran
- Coordinates: 37°00′39″N 45°03′01″E
- Country: Iran
- Province: West Azerbaijan
- County: Oshnavieh
- Bakhsh: Nalus
- Rural District: Haq

Population (2006)
  - Total: 357
- Time zone: UTC+3:30 (IRST)
  - Summer (DST): UTC+4:30 (IRDT)

Khvoresht (Persian: خورشت, also Romanized as Khowresht) is a village in Haq Rural District, Nalus District, Oshnavieh County, West Azerbaijan Province, Iran. At the 2006 census, its population was 357, in 62 families.
