= Pey Qaleh, West Azerbaijan =

Pey Qaleh پي قلعه
- Village
- Location within Iran
- Coordinates: 36°59′33″N 45°01′57″E
- Country: Iran
- Province: West Azerbaijan
- County: Oshnavieh
- Bakhsh: Nalus
- Rural District: Haq

Population (2006)
  - Total: 120
- Time zone: UTC+3:30 (IRST)
  - Summer (DST): UTC+4:30 (IRDT)

Pey Qaleh (Persian: پي قلعه, also Romanized as Pey Qal‘eh; also known as Pā Qal‘eh) is a village in Haq Rural District, Nalus District, Oshnavieh County, West Azerbaijan Province, Iran. At the 2006 census, its population was 120, in 28 families.
