= Kani Kasil =

Kani Kasil كاني كسيل
- Village
- Country: Iran
- Province: West Azerbaijan
- County: Oshnavieh
- Bakhsh: Nalus
- Rural District: Haq

Population (2006)
  - Total: 70
- Time zone: UTC+3:30 (IRST)
  - Summer (DST): UTC+4:30 (IRDT)

Kani Kasil (Persian: كاني كسيل, also Romanized as Kānī Kasīl) is a village in Haq Rural District, Nalus District, Oshnavieh County, West Azerbaijan Province, Iran. At the 2006 census, its population was 70, consisting of 9 families.
