= Jebreilabad =

Jebreilabad جبرئيل اباد
- Village
- Location within Iran
- Coordinates: 37°02′14″N 45°10′25″E
- Country: Iran
- Province: West Azerbaijan
- County: Oshnavieh
- Bakhsh: Central
- Rural District: Oshnavieh-ye Shomali

Population (2006)
  - Total: 89
- Time zone: UTC+3:30 (IRST)
  - Summer (DST): UTC+4:30 (IRDT)

Jebreilabad (Persian: جبرئيل اباد, also Romanized as Jebre'īlābād and Jebrā'īlābād) is a village in Oshnavieh-ye Shomali Rural District, in the Central District of Oshnavieh County, West Azerbaijan Province, Iran. At the 2006 census, its population was 89, in 16 families.
