= Eslamlu =

Eslamlu (Persian: اسلاملو) may refer to:

- Eslamlu, Fars, a village in Fars Province, Iran
- Eslamlu, Oshnavieh, West Azerbaijan Province
- Eslamlu, Urmia, West Azerbaijan Province
