= Sar Darreh, West Azerbaijan =

Village in West Azerbaijan province, Iran

Sar Darreh Persian: سردره
- Village
- Location within Iran
- Coordinates: 37°00′15″N 45°08′52″E
- Country: Iran
- Province: West Azerbaijan
- County: Oshnavieh
- District: Nalus
- Rural District: Oshnavieh-ye Jonubi

Population (2016)
  - Total: 273
- Time zone: UTC+3:30 (IRST)

Sar Darreh (Persian: سردره) (Note: Also known as Avval Darvāzeh) is a village in Oshnavieh-ye Jonubi Rural District (Note: Formerly Godar Rural District) of Nalus District in Oshnavieh County, West Azerbaijan province, Iran.

== Demographics ==
=== Population ===
At the time of the 2006 National Census, the village's population was 302 in 40 households. The following census in 2011 counted 298 people in 78 households. The 2016 census measured the population of the village as 273 people in 58 households.
