= Alian, West Azerbaijan =

Alian عليان
- Village
- Location within Iran
- Coordinates: 37°14′12″N 45°08′42″E
- Country: Iran
- Province: West Azerbaijan
- County: Oshnavieh
- Bakhsh: Central
- Rural District: Dasht-e Bil

Population (2006)
  - Total: 221
- Time zone: UTC+3:30 (IRST)
  - Summer (DST): UTC+4:30 (IRDT)

Alian (Persian: عليان, also Romanized as ‘Alīān) is a village in Dasht-e Bil Rural District, in the Central District of Oshnavieh County, West Azerbaijan Province, Iran. At the 2006 census, its population was 221, in 40 families.
