= Deh Shams =

Deh Shams (Persian: ده شمس) may refer to:

- Deh Shams-e Bozorg
- Deh Shams-e Kuchak
