= Dowrbeh =

Village in West Azerbaijan province, Iran

Dowrbeh Persian: دوربه
- Village
- Location within Iran
- Coordinates: 37°07′36″N 45°11′47″E
- Country: Iran
- Province: West Azerbaijan
- County: Oshnavieh
- District: Central
- Rural District: Dasht-e Bil

Population (2016)
  - Total: 428
- Time zone: UTC+3:30 (IRST)

Dowrbeh (Persian: دوربه) is a village in Dasht-e Bil Rural District of the Central District in Oshnavieh County, West Azerbaijan province, Iran.

== Demographics ==
=== Population ===
At the time of the 2006 National Census, the village's population was 413 in 75 households. The following census in 2011 counted 453 people in 109 households. The 2016 census measured the population of the village as 428 people in 112 households.
