= Qarah Soqol =

Village in West Azerbaijan province, Iran

Qarah Soqol Persian: قره سقل
- Village
- Location within Iran
- Coordinates: 36°59′49″N 45°11′34″E
- Country: Iran
- Province: West Azerbaijan
- County: Oshnavieh
- District: Nalus
- Rural District: Oshnavieh-ye Jonubi

Population (2016)
  - Total: 204
- Time zone: UTC+3:30 (IRST)

Qarah Soqol (Persian: قره سقل) is a village in Oshnavieh-ye Jonubi Rural District (Note: Formerly Godar Rural District) of Nalus District in Oshnavieh County, West Azerbaijan province, Iran.

== Demographics ==
=== Population ===
At the time of the 2006 National Census, the village's population was 204 in 29 households. The following census in 2011 counted 194 people in 58 households. The 2016 census measured the population of the village as 135 people in 38 households.
