= Dustak =

Village in West Azerbaijan province, Iran

Dustak Persian: دوستك
- Village
- Location within Iran
- Coordinates: 37°15′09″N 45°04′24″E
- Country: Iran
- Province: West Azerbaijan
- County: Oshnavieh
- District: Central
- Rural District: Dasht-e Bil

Population (2016)
  - Total: 430
- Time zone: UTC+3:30 (IRST)

Dustak (Persian: دوستك) (Note: Also romanized as Dūstak) is a village in Dasht-e Bil Rural District of the Central District in Oshnavieh County, West Azerbaijan province, Iran.

== Demographics ==
=== Population ===
At the time of the 2006 National Census, the village's population was 384 in 87 households. The following census in 2011 counted 426 people in 103 households. The 2016 census measured the population of the village as 430 people in 104 households.
