= Shahvaneh =

Village in West Azerbaijan province, Iran

Shahvaneh Persian: شاهوانه
- Village
- Location within Iran
- Coordinates: 37°04′39″N 45°07′37″E
- Country: Iran
- Province: West Azerbaijan
- County: Oshnavieh
- District: Central
- Rural District: Oshnavieh-ye Shomali

Population (2016)
  - Total: 672
- Time zone: UTC+3:30 (IRST)

Shahvaneh (Persian: شاهوانه) (Note: Also romanized as Shāhvāneh) is a village in Oshnavieh-ye Shomali Rural District of the Central District in Oshnavieh County, West Azerbaijan province, Iran.

== Demographics ==
=== Population ===
At the time of the 2006 National Census, the village's population was 665 in 116 households. The following census in 2011 counted 649 people in 166 households. The 2016 census measured the population of the village as 672 people in 161 households.
