= Sheykhan, Oshnavieh =

Village in West Azerbaijan province, Iran

Sheykhan Persian: شيخان
- Village
- Location within Iran
- Coordinates: 36°58′15″N 45°03′32″E
- Country: Iran
- Province: West Azerbaijan
- County: Oshnavieh
- District: Nalus
- Rural District: Haq

Population (2016)
  - Total: 821
- Time zone: UTC+3:30 (IRST)

Sheykhan (Persian: شيخان) (Note: Also romanized as Sheykhān) is a village in Haq Rural District of Nalus District in Oshnavieh County, West Azerbaijan province, Iran.

== Demographics ==
=== Population ===
At the time of the 2006 National Census, the village's population was 787 in 147 households. The following census in 2011 counted 784 people in 213 households. The 2016 census measured the population of the village as 821 people in 189 households.
