= Lowlakan =

Village in West Azerbaijan province, Iran

Lowlakan Persian: لولكان
- Village
- Location within Iran
- Coordinates: 37°12′55″N 45°03′52″E
- Country: Iran
- Province: West Azerbaijan
- County: Oshnavieh
- District: Central
- Rural District: Dasht-e Bil

Population (2016)
  - Total: 918
- Time zone: UTC+3:30 (IRST)

Lowlakan (Persian: لولكان) (Note: Also romanized as Lowlakān) is a village in Dasht-e Bil Rural District of the Central District in Oshnavieh County, West Azerbaijan province, Iran.

== Demographics ==
=== Population ===
At the time of the 2006 National Census, the village's population was 770 in 162 households. The following census in 2011 counted 874 people in 219 households. The 2016 census measured the population of the village as 918 people in 221 households.
