= Bamzurteh =

Village in West Azerbaijan province, Iran

Bamzurteh Persian: بمزورته
- Village
- Location within Iran
- Coordinates: 37°00′42″N 45°01′23″E
- Country: Iran
- Province: West Azerbaijan
- County: Oshnavieh
- District: Nalus
- Rural District: Haq

Population (2016)
  - Total: 910
- Time zone: UTC+3:30 (IRST)

Bamzurteh (Persian: بمزورته) (Note: Formerly known as Bimzorteh (بيمضرته), also romanized as Bīmẕorteh) is a village in Haq Rural District of Nalus District in Oshnavieh County, West Azerbaijan province, Iran.

== Demographics ==
=== Population ===
At the time of the 2006 National Census, the village's population, as Bimzorteh, was 829 in 177 households. The following census in 2011 counted 892 people in 234 households, by which time the name of the village was listed as Bamzurteh. The 2016 census measured the population of the village as 910 people in 213 households.
