= Chaparabad =

Village in West Azerbaijan province, Iran

Chaparabad Persian: چپراباد
- Village
- Location within Iran
- Coordinates: 36°57′59″N 45°07′41″E
- Country: Iran
- Province: West Azerbaijan
- County: Oshnavieh
- District: Nalus
- Rural District: Oshnavieh-ye Jonubi

Population (2016)
  - Total: 203
- Time zone: UTC+3:30 (IRST)

Chaparabad (Persian: چپراباد) (Note: Also romanized as Chaparābād) is a village in Oshnavieh-ye Jonubi Rural District (Note: Formerly Godar Rural District) of Nalus District in Oshnavieh County, West Azerbaijan province, Iran.

== Demographics ==
=== Population ===
At the time of the 2006 National Census, the village's population was 229 in 49 households. The following census in 2011 counted 215 people in 59 households. The 2016 census measured the population of the village as 203 people in 60 households.
