= Gerd-e Kashan =

Village in West Azerbaijan province, Iran

Gerd-e Kashan Persian: گردكاشان
- Village
- Location within Iran
- Coordinates: 37°04′50″N 45°09′26″E
- Country: Iran
- Province: West Azerbaijan
- County: Oshnavieh
- District: Central
- Rural District: Oshnavieh-ye Shomali

Population (2016)
  - Total: 440
- Time zone: UTC+3:30 (IRST)

Gerd-e Kashan (Persian: گردكاشان) (Note: Also romanized as Gerd-e Kāshān) is a village in Oshnavieh-ye Shomali Rural District of the Central District in Oshnavieh County, West Azerbaijan province, Iran.

== Demographics ==
=== Population ===
At the time of the 2006 National Census, the village's population was 380 in 71 households. The following census in 2011 counted 390 people in 109 households. The 2016 census measured the population of the village as 440 people in 104 households.
