= Sufian, Oshnavieh =

Village in West Azerbaijan province, Iran

Sufian Persian: صوفيان
- Village
- Location within Iran
- Coordinates: 36°54′24″N 45°09′18″E
- Country: Iran
- Province: West Azerbaijan
- County: Oshnavieh
- District: Nalus
- Rural District: Haq

Population (2016)
  - Total: 819
- Time zone: UTC+3:30 (IRST)

Sufian (Persian: صوفيان) (Note: Also romanized as Şowfyān, Şūfīān, and Sūfīyān) is a village in Haq Rural District of Nalus District in Oshnavieh County, West Azerbaijan province, Iran.

== Demographics ==
=== Population ===
At the time of the 2006 National Census, the village's population was 975 in 159 households. The following census in 2011 counted 829 people in 232 households. The 2016 census measured the population of the village as 819 people in 177 households.
