= Siavan =

Siavan (Persian: سياوان) may refer to:

- Siavan, Oshnavieh
- Siavan, Salmas
