= Kohneh Qaleh =

Village in West Azerbaijan province, Iran

Kohneh Qaleh Persian: كهنه قلعه
- Village
- Location within Iran
- Coordinates: 36°58′53″N 45°14′44″E
- Country: Iran
- Province: West Azerbaijan
- County: Oshnavieh
- District: Nalus
- Rural District: Oshnavieh-ye Jonubi

Population (2016)
  - Total: 256
- Time zone: UTC+3:30 (IRST)

Kohneh Qaleh (Persian: كهنه قلعه) (Note: Also romanized as Kohneh Qal‘eh) is a village in Oshnavieh-ye Jonubi Rural District (Note: Formerly Godar Rural District) of Nalus District in Oshnavieh County, West Azerbaijan province, Iran.

== Demographics ==
=== Population ===
At the time of the 2006 National Census, the village's population was 306 in 55 households. The following census in 2011 counted 289 people in 96 households. The 2016 census measured the population of the village as 256 people in 70 households.
