= Aliabad, Oshnavieh-ye Shomali =

Village in West Azerbaijan province, Iran

Aliabad Persian: علي اباد
- Village
- Location within Iran
- Coordinates: 37°03′30″N 45°08′27″E
- Country: Iran
- Province: West Azerbaijan
- County: Oshnavieh
- District: Central
- Rural District: Oshnavieh-ye Shomali

Population (2016)
  - Total: 733
- Time zone: UTC+3:30 (IRST)

Aliabad (Persian: علي اباد) (Note: Also romanized as ‘Alīābād) is a village in Oshnavieh-ye Shomali Rural District of the Central District in Oshnavieh County, West Azerbaijan province, Iran.

== Demographics ==
=== Population ===
At the time of the 2006 National Census, the village's population was 648 in 108 households. The following census in 2011 counted 616 people in 190 households. The 2016 census measured the population of the village as 733 people in 180 households.
