= Sujeh =

Village in West Azerbaijan province, Iran

Sujeh Persian: سوجه
- Village
- Location within Iran
- Coordinates: 37°01′13″N 45°10′06″E
- Country: Iran
- Province: West Azerbaijan
- County: Oshnavieh
- District: Central
- Rural District: Oshnavieh-ye Shomali

Population (2016)
  - Total: 439
- Time zone: UTC+3:30 (IRST)

Sujeh (Persian: سوجه) (Note: Also romanized as Sūjeh) is a village in Oshnavieh-ye Shomali Rural District of the Central District in Oshnavieh County, West Azerbaijan province, Iran.

== Demographics ==
=== Population ===
At the time of the 2006 National Census, the village's population was 489 in 69 households. The following census in 2011 counted 464 people in 118 households. The 2016 census measured the population of the village as 439 people in 120 households.
