= Kani Rash, Oshnavieh =

Village in West Azerbaijan province, Iran

Kani Rash Persian: كاني رش
- Village
- Location within Iran
- Coordinates: 36°55′55″N 45°03′50″E
- Country: Iran
- Province: West Azerbaijan
- County: Oshnavieh
- District: Nalus
- Rural District: Haq

Population (2016)
  - Total: 410
- Time zone: UTC+3:30 (IRST)

Kani Rash (Persian: كاني رش) (Note: Also romanized as Kānī Rash) is a village in Haq Rural District of Nalus District in Oshnavieh County, West Azerbaijan province, Iran.

== Demographics ==
=== Population ===
At the time of the 2006 National Census, the village's population was 416 in 69 households. The following census in 2011 counted 446 people in 106 households. The 2016 census measured the population of the village as 410 people in 115 households.
