= Sar Giz =

Village in West Azerbaijan province, Iran

Sar Giz Persian: سرگيز
- Village
- Location within Iran
- Coordinates: 37°00′15″N 45°11′07″E
- Country: Iran
- Province: West Azerbaijan
- County: Oshnavieh
- District: Nalus
- Rural District: Oshnavieh-ye Jonubi

Population (2016)
  - Total: 421
- Time zone: UTC+3:30 (IRST)

Sar Giz (Persian: سرگيز) (Note: Also romanized as Sar Gīz; also known as Sar Gīs, Sarkīs, and Sarkīz) is a village in Oshnavieh-ye Jonubi Rural District (Note: Formerly Godar Rural District) of Nalus District in Oshnavieh County, West Azerbaijan province, Iran.

== Demographics ==
=== Population ===
At the time of the 2006 National Census, the village's population was 448 in 75 households. The following census in 2011 counted 432 people in 127 households. The 2016 census measured the population of the village as 421 people in 97 households.
