= Bala Gir =

Village in West Azerbaijan province, Iran

Bala Gir Persian: بالاگير
- Village
- Location within Iran
- Coordinates: 36°58′44″N 45°13′46″E
- Country: Iran
- Province: West Azerbaijan
- County: Oshnavieh
- District: Nalus
- Rural District: Oshnavieh-ye Jonubi

Population (2016)
  - Total: 430
- Time zone: UTC+3:30 (IRST)

Bala Gir (Persian: بالاگير) (Note: Also romanized as Bālā Gīr) is a village in Oshnavieh-ye Jonubi Rural District (Note: Formerly Godar Rural District) of Nalus District in Oshnavieh County, West Azerbaijan province, Iran.

== Demographics ==
=== Population ===
At the time of the 2006 National Census, the village's population was 418 in 78 households. The following census in 2011 counted 423 people in 123 households. The 2016 census measured the population of the village as 430 people in 119 households.
