= Gelaz =

Village in West Azerbaijan province, Iran

Gelaz Persian: گلاز
- Village
- Location within Iran
- Coordinates: 37°07′21″N 45°01′57″E
- Country: Iran
- Province: West Azerbaijan
- County: Oshnavieh
- District: Central
- Rural District: Dasht-e Bil

Population (2016)
  - Total: 1,154
- Time zone: UTC+3:30 (IRST)

Gelaz (Persian: گلاز) (Note: Also romanized as Gelāz; also known as Kelāz) is a village in Dasht-e Bil Rural District of the Central District in Oshnavieh County, West Azerbaijan province, Iran.

== Demographics ==
=== Population ===
At the time of the 2006 National Census, the village's population was 935 in 207 households. The following census in 2011 counted 1,059 people in 273 households. The 2016 census measured the population of the village as 1,154 people in 304 households.
