= Nalivan =

Village in West Azerbaijan province, Iran

Nalivan Persian: نليوان
- Village
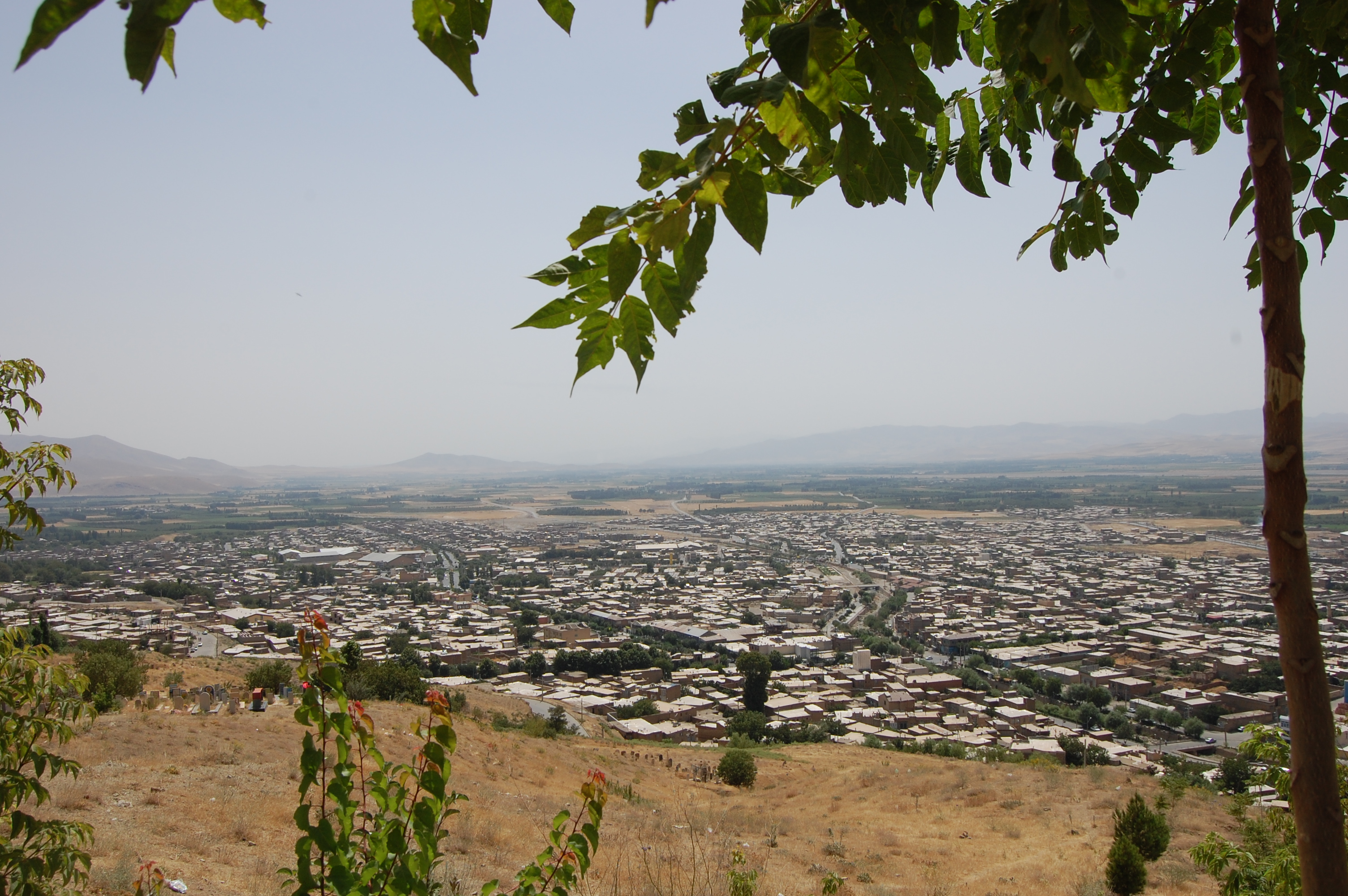
- Nalivan in 2009

- Location within Iran
- Coordinates: 37°03′46″N 45°07′17″E
- Country: Iran
- Province: West Azerbaijan
- County: Oshnavieh
- District: Central
- Rural District: Oshnavieh-ye Shomali

Population (2016)
  - Total: 1,186
- Time zone: UTC+3:30 (IRST)

Nalivan (Persian: نليوان) (Note: Also romanized as Nalīvān; also known as Malivan) is a village in, and the capital of, Oshnavieh-ye Shomali Rural District in the Central District of Oshnavieh County, West Azerbaijan province, Iran. It was the capital of Dasht-e Bil Rural District until its capital was transferred to the village of Agh Bolagh.

== Demographics ==
=== Population ===
At the time of the 2006 National Census, the village's population was 878 in 145 households. The following census in 2011 counted 1,040 people in 234 households. The 2016 census measured the population of the village as 1,186 people in 302 households. It was the most populous village in its rural district.
