= Dorud, West Azerbaijan =

Village in West Azerbaijan province, Iran

Dorud Persian: دورود
- Village
- Location within Iran
- Coordinates: 36°57′44″N 45°01′11″E
- Country: Iran
- Province: West Azerbaijan
- County: Oshnavieh
- District: Nalus
- Rural District: Haq

Population (2016)
  - Total: 496
- Time zone: UTC+3:30 (IRST)

Dorud (Persian: دورود) (Note: Also romanized as Dorūd) is a village in Haq Rural District of Nalus District in Oshnavieh County, West Azerbaijan province, Iran.

== Demographics ==
=== Population ===
At the time of the 2006 National Census, the village's population was 444 in 66 households. The following census in 2011 counted 478 people in 104 households. The 2016 census measured the population of the village as 496 people in 112 households.
