= Do Ab, West Azerbaijan =

Village in West Azerbaijan province, Iran

Do Ab Persian: دواب
- Village
- Location within Iran
- Coordinates: 36°55′32″N 45°11′46″E
- Country: Iran
- Province: West Azerbaijan
- County: Oshnavieh
- District: Nalus
- Rural District: Oshnavieh-ye Jonubi

Population (2016)
  - Total: 206
- Time zone: UTC+3:30 (IRST)

Do Ab (Persian: دواب) (Note: Also romanized as Do Āb and Doāb; also known as Doābād) is a village in Oshnavieh-ye Jonubi Rural District (Note: Formerly Godar Rural District) of Nalus District in Oshnavieh County, West Azerbaijan province, Iran.

== Demographics ==
=== Population ===
At the time of the 2006 National Census, the village's population was 281 in 41 households. The following census in 2011 counted 191 people in 55 households. The 2016 census measured the population of the village as 206 people in 60 households.
