= Mirabad, Oshnavieh =

Village in West Azerbaijan province, Iran

Mirabad Persian: ميراباد
- Village
- Location within Iran
- Coordinates: 36°59′14″N 45°00′57″E
- Country: Iran
- Province: West Azerbaijan
- County: Oshnavieh
- District: Nalus
- Rural District: Haq

Population (2016)
  - Total: 1,052
- Time zone: UTC+3:30 (IRST)

Mirabad (Persian: ميراباد) (Note: Also romanized as Mīrābād) is a village in Haq Rural District of Nalus District in Oshnavieh County, West Azerbaijan province, Iran.

== Demographics ==
=== Population ===
At the time of the 2006 National Census, the village's population was 1,041 in 185 households. The following census in 2011 counted 1,093 people in 288 households. The 2016 census measured the population of the village as 1,052 people in 295 households.
