= Deh Gorji =

Village in West Azerbaijan province, Iran

Deh Gorji Persian: ده گرجي
- Village
- Location within Iran
- Coordinates: 36°58′02″N 45°11′06″E
- Country: Iran
- Province: West Azerbaijan
- County: Oshnavieh
- District: Nalus
- Rural District: Oshnavieh-ye Jonubi

Population (2016)
  - Total: 567
- Time zone: UTC+3:30 (IRST)

Deh Gorji (Persian: ده گرجي) (Note: Also romanized as Deh Gorjī) is a village in Oshnavieh-ye Jonubi Rural District (Note: Formerly Godar Rural District) of Nalus District in Oshnavieh County, West Azerbaijan province, Iran.

== Demographics ==
=== Population ===
At the time of the 2006 National Census, the village's population was 522 in 94 households. The following census in 2011 counted 565 people in 157 households. The 2016 census measured the population of the village as 567 people in 155 households.
