= Bizhabad =

Village in West Azerbaijan province, Iran

Bizhabad Persian: بيژاباد
- Village
- Location within Iran
- Coordinates: 37°05′08″N 45°10′45″E
- Country: Iran
- Province: West Azerbaijan
- County: Oshnavieh
- District: Central
- Rural District: Oshnavieh-ye Shomali

Population (2016)
  - Total: 435
- Time zone: UTC+3:30 (IRST)

Bizhabad (Persian: بيژاباد) (Note: Also romanized as Bīzhābād; also known as Bīzhanābād) is a village in Oshnavieh-ye Shomali Rural District of the Central District in Oshnavieh County, West Azerbaijan province, Iran.

== Demographics ==
=== Population ===
At the time of the 2006 National Census, the village's population was 391 in 65 households. The following census in 2011 counted 421 people in 99 households. The 2016 census measured the population of the village as 435 people in 119 households.
