= Sengan, West Azerbaijan =

Village in West Azerbaijan province, Iran

Sengan Persian: سنگان
- Village
- Location within Iran
- Coordinates: 37°00′48″N 45°03′51″E
- Country: Iran
- Province: West Azerbaijan
- County: Oshnavieh
- District: Nalus
- Rural District: Haq

Population (2016)
  - Total: 1,198
- Time zone: UTC+3:30 (IRST)

Sengan (Persian: سنگان) (Note: Also romanized as Sengān; also known as Sīngān) is a village in Haq Rural District of Nalus District in Oshnavieh County, West Azerbaijan province, Iran.

== Demographics ==
=== Population ===
At the time of the 2006 National Census, the village's population was 925 in 151 households. The following census in 2011 counted 994 people in 265 households. The 2016 census measured the population of the village as 1,198 people in 317 households. It was the most populous village in its rural district.
