= Kani Sorkh =

Kani Sorkh (Persian: كاني سرخ) may refer to:

- Kani Sorkh, Kurdistan
- Kani Sorkh, West Azerbaijan
