= Chahar Bot =

Village in West Azerbaijan province, Iran

Chahar Bot Persian: چهاربت
- Village
- Location within Iran
- Coordinates: 36°57′27″N 45°13′49″E
- Country: Iran
- Province: West Azerbaijan
- County: Oshnavieh
- District: Nalus
- Rural District: Oshnavieh-ye Jonubi

Population (2016)
  - Total: 125
- Time zone: UTC+3:30 (IRST)

Chahar Bot (Persian: چهاربت) (Note: Also romanized as Chahār Bot; also known as Chahār Būt) is a village in Oshnavieh-ye Jonubi Rural District (Note: Formerly Godar Rural District) of Nalus District in Oshnavieh County, West Azerbaijan province, Iran.

== Demographics ==
=== Population ===
At the time of the 2006 National Census, the village's population was 125 in 27 households. The following census in 2011 counted 148 people in 41 households. The 2016 census measured the population of the village as 125 people in 39 households.
