= Sakani =

Sakani (Persian: سكاني) may refer to:

- Sakani, Kurdistan
- Sakani, West Azerbaijan
