= Gond-e Vila =

Village in West Azerbaijan province, Iran

Gond-e Vila Persian: گندويلا
- Village
- Location within Iran
- Coordinates: 37°02′12″N 45°12′05″E
- Country: Iran
- Province: West Azerbaijan
- County: Oshnavieh
- District: Central
- Rural District: Oshnavieh-ye Shomali

Population (2016)
  - Total: 671
- Time zone: UTC+3:30 (IRST)

Gond-e Vila (Persian: گندويلا) (Note: Also romanized as Gond-e Vīlā; also known as Gonbad-e Vīlā) is a village in Oshnavieh-ye Shomali Rural District of the Central District in Oshnavieh County, West Azerbaijan province, Iran.

== Demographics ==
=== Population ===
At the time of the 2006 National Census, the village's population was 681 in 150 households. The following census in 2011 counted 679 people in 175 households. The 2016 census measured the population of the village as 671 people in 188 households.
