= Eslamlu, Oshnavieh =

Village in West Azerbaijan province, Iran

Eslamlu Persian: اسلاملو
- Village
- Location within Iran
- Coordinates: 37°08′33″N 45°10′02″E
- Country: Iran
- Province: West Azerbaijan
- County: Oshnavieh
- District: Central
- Rural District: Dasht-e Bil

Population (2016)
  - Total: 514
- Time zone: UTC+3:30 (IRST)

Eslamlu (Persian: اسلاملو) (Note: Also romanized as Eslāmlū; also known as Eslāmbū) is a village in Dasht-e Bil Rural District of the Central District in Oshnavieh County, West Azerbaijan province, Iran.

== Demographics ==
=== Population ===
At the time of the 2006 National Census, the village's population was 431 in 80 households. The following census in 2011 counted 465 people in 130 households. The 2016 census measured the population of the village as 514 people in 140 households.
