= Hasan Turan =

Hasan Turan may refer to:

- Hasan Turan (born 1962), Iraqi politician
- Hasan Turan (born 1967), Turkish politician
- Hasan Nuran, a village in West Azerbaijan Province, Iran
