= Hasan Nuran =

Village in West Azerbaijan province, Iran

Hasan Nuran Persian: حسن نوران
- Village
- Location within Iran
- Coordinates: 37°00′18″N 45°12′46″E
- Country: Iran
- Province: West Azerbaijan
- County: Oshnavieh
- District: Central
- Rural District: Oshnavieh-ye Shomali

Population (2016)
  - Total: 593
- Time zone: UTC+3:30 (IRST)

Hasan Nuran (Persian: حسن نوران) (Note: Also romanized as Ḩasan Nūrān'; also known as Hasan Tūrān, Ḩasanlī, Ḩasanlū, 'and Khassan) is a village in Oshnavieh-ye Shomali Rural District of the Central District in Oshnavieh County, West Azerbaijan province, Iran.

== Demographics ==
=== Population ===
At the time of the 2006 National Census, the village's population was 614 in 131 households. The following census in 2011 counted 611 people in 167 households. The 2016 census measured the population of the village as 593 people in 159 households.
