= Heq (disambiguation) =

Heq or HEQ may refer to:

- Romanization of Haq, Iran, a village in Haq Rural District
- Higher education qualification in Diploma of Higher Education
- History of Education Quarterly, a quarterly peer-reviewed academic journal
- Hengshan West railway station, China Railway telegraph code HEQ
