= Kani Sorkh, West Azerbaijan =

Village in West Azerbaijan province, Iran

Kani Sorkh Persian: كاني سرخ
- Village
- Location within Iran
- Coordinates: 37°01′09″N 45°03′05″E
- Country: Iran
- Province: West Azerbaijan
- County: Oshnavieh
- District: Nalus
- Rural District: Haq

Population (2016)
  - Total: 563
- Time zone: UTC+3:30 (IRST)

Kani Sorkh (Persian: كاني سرخ) (Note: Also romanized as Kānī Sorkh) is a village in Haq Rural District of Nalus District in Oshnavieh County, West Azerbaijan province, Iran.

== Demographics ==
=== Population ===
At the time of the 2006 National Census, the village's population was 419 in 65 households. The following census in 2011 counted 494 people in 114 households. The 2016 census measured the population of the village as 563 people in 141 households.
