= Haq, Iran =

Village in West Azerbaijan province, Iran

Haq Persian: هق
- Village
- Location within Iran
- Coordinates: 36°58′55″N 45°02′26″E
- Country: Iran
- Province: West Azerbaijan
- County: Oshnavieh
- District: Nalus
- Rural District: Haq

Population (2016)
  - Total: 1,017
- Time zone: UTC+3:30 (IRST)

Haq (Persian: هق) (Note: Also romanized as Heq; also known as Hek) is a village in, and the capital of, Haq Rural District in Nalus District in Oshnavieh County, West Azerbaijan province, Iran.

== Demographics ==
=== Population ===
At the time of the 2006 National Census, the village's population was 927 in 155 households. The following census in 2011 counted 963 people in 230 households. The 2016 census measured the population of the village as 1,017 people in 224 households.
