= Deh Shams-e Kuchak =

Village in West Azerbaijan province, Iran

Deh Shams-e Kuchak Persian: ده شمس كوچك
- Village
- Location within Iran
- Coordinates: 36°59′22″N 45°12′20″E
- Country: Iran
- Province: West Azerbaijan
- County: Oshnavieh
- District: Nalus
- Rural District: Oshnavieh-ye Jonubi

Population (2016)
  - Total: 264
- Time zone: UTC+3:30 (IRST)

Deh Shams-e Kuchak (Persian: ده شمس كوچك) (Note: Also romanized as Deh Shams-e Kūchak) is a village in Oshnavieh-ye Jonubi Rural District (Note: Formerly Godar Rural District) of Nalus District in Oshnavieh County, West Azerbaijan province, Iran.

== Demographics ==
=== Population ===
At the time of the 2006 National Census, the village's population was 253 in 42 households. The following census in 2011 counted 225 people in 64 households. The 2016 census measured the population of the village as 264 people in 70 households.
