= Gond-e Molla Isa =

Village in West Azerbaijan province, Iran

Gond-e Molla Isa Persian: گندملاعيسي
- Village
- Location within Iran
- Coordinates: 37°08′43″N 45°05′30″E
- Country: Iran
- Province: West Azerbaijan
- County: Oshnavieh
- District: Central
- Rural District: Dasht-e Bil

Population (2016)
  - Total: 965
- Time zone: UTC+3:30 (IRST)

Gond-e Molla Isa (Persian: گندملاعيسي) (Note: Also romanized as Gond-e Mollā ‘Īsá; also known as Gonbad-e Mollā ‘Īsá) is a village in Dasht-e Bil Rural District of the Central District in Oshnavieh County, West Azerbaijan province, Iran.

== Demographics ==
=== Population ===
At the time of the 2006 National Census, the village's population was 841 in 175 households. The following census in 2011 counted 919 people in 225 households. The 2016 census measured the population of the village as 965 people in 227 households.
