= Sar Kani, Iran =

Village in West Azerbaijan province, Iran

Sar Kani Persian: سركاني
- Village
- Location within Iran
- Coordinates: 37°12′10″N 45°07′26″E
- Country: Iran
- Province: West Azerbaijan
- County: Oshnavieh
- District: Central
- Rural District: Dasht-e Bil

Population (2016)
  - Total: 702
- Time zone: UTC+3:30 (IRST)

Sar Kani (Persian: سركاني) (Note: Also romanized as Sar Kānī; formerly known as Seh Kani (سه كاني), also romanized as Seh Kānī; also known as Sakaneh, Sakānī, and Sehgāneh) is a village in Dasht-e Bil Rural District of the Central District in Oshnavieh County, West Azerbaijan province, Iran.

== Demographics ==
=== Population ===
At the time of the 2006 National Census, the village's population was 663 in 143 households. The following census in 2011 counted 739 people in 211 households. The 2016 census measured the population of the village as 702 people in 189 households.
