= Alyan =

Alyan may refer to:

== Places ==
- Alian (disambiguation), places in Iran
- Sikachi-Alyan, a village in Russia

== People ==
- Murad Alyan (b. 1977), Israeli soccer player
- Yousuf Saleh Alyan, Kuwaiti newspaper executive
- Alyan Muhammad Ali al-Wa'eli (b. 1970), Yemeni fugitive
