= Siavan, Oshnavieh =

Village in West Azerbaijan province, Iran

Siavan Persian: سياوان
- Village
- Location within Iran
- Coordinates: 37°12′58″N 45°09′43″E
- Country: Iran
- Province: West Azerbaijan
- County: Oshnavieh
- District: Central
- Rural District: Dasht-e Bil

Population (2016)
  - Total: 469
- Time zone: UTC+3:30 (IRST)

Siavan (Persian: سياوان) (Note: Also romanized as Sīāvān) is a village in Dasht-e Bil Rural District of the Central District in Oshnavieh County, West Azerbaijan province, Iran.

== Demographics ==
=== Population ===
At the time of the 2006 National Census, the village's population was 506 in 91 households. The following census in 2011 counted 536 people in 149 households. The 2016 census measured the population of the village as 469 people in 126 households.
