= Gonbad-e Sorkh =

Gonbad-e Sorkh (Persian: گنبدسرخ) may refer to:

- Gonbad-e Sorkh, Bandar Abbas
- Gonbad-e Sorkh, Minab
- Gonbad-e Sorkh, Maragheh
