= Gumbad =

Gumbad (Persian: گومبد) may refer to several places in Iran:

- Gumbad, East Azerbaijan, or Aq Gonbad
- Gumbad, Hamadan, or Gonbad

== See also ==
- Gonbad (disambiguation)
