= Deh Shams-e Bozorg =

Village in West Azerbaijan province, Iran

Deh Shams-e Bozorg Persian: ده شمس بزرگ
- Village
- Location within Iran
- Coordinates: 36°59′14″N 45°12′25″E
- Country: Iran
- Province: West Azerbaijan
- County: Oshnavieh
- District: Nalus
- Rural District: Oshnavieh-ye Jonubi

Population (2016)
  - Total: 779
- Time zone: UTC+3:30 (IRST)

Deh Shams-e Bozorg (Persian: ده شمس بزرگ) is a village in Oshnavieh-ye Jonubi Rural District (Note: Formerly Godar Rural District) of Nalus District in Oshnavieh County, West Azerbaijan province, Iran.

== Demographics ==
=== Population ===
At the time of the 2006 National Census, the village's population was 767 in 126 households. The following census in 2011 counted 819 people in 241 households. The 2016 census measured the population of the village as 779 people in 225 households. It was the most populous village in its rural district.
