= Gonbad (disambiguation) =

Gonbad is a type of Persian dome.

Gonbad (Persian: گنبد) or its variants may also refer to:

== Iran ==
- Kateh Gonbad, a village in Fars province
- Gonbad Kavous University, Golestan province
- Gonbad-e Sorkh, Maragheh, a building in East Azerbaijan province
- Gonbad-e Kavus, a city in Golestan province
- Gonbad-e Qabus (tower), a monument in Golestan province
- Gonbad-e Kavus County, an administrative division of Golestan province
- Gonbad-e Pir Mohammad, a village in Ilam province
- Gonbad Kabud Mosque, Razavi Khorasan province
- Gonbadli, Razavi Khorasan, a village in Razavi Khorasan province
- Gonbad-e Alavi, a village in Sistan and Baluchestan province

== See also ==
- Gumbad (disambiguation)
- Gombaz (disambiguation), alternative spelling for the dome
- Kuba (disambiguation)
