= Gumuz =

Gumuz may refer to:

- Gumuz people, of Ethiopia and Sudan
- Gumuz language, the Nilo-Saharan language spoken by them

== See also ==
- Gombaz (disambiguation)
