= Oshnavieh-ye Jonubi Rural District =

Rural district in West Azerbaijan province, Iran

Oshnavieh-ye Jonubi Rural District Persian: دهستان اشنويه جنوبي
- Rural District
- Location within Iran
- Coordinates: 36°57′N 45°11′E
- Country: Iran
- Province: West Azerbaijan
- County: Oshnavieh
- District: Nalus
- Established: 1987
- Capital: Nalus

Population (2016)
  - Total: 4,117
- Time zone: UTC+3:30 (IRST)

Oshnavieh-ye Jonubi Rural District (Persian: دهستان اشنويه جنوبي) (Note: Formerly Godar Rural District (دهستان گدار)) is in Nalus District of Oshnavieh County, West Azerbaijan province, Iran. It is administered from the city of Nalus.

== Demographics ==
=== Population ===
At the time of the 2006 National Census, the rural district's population was 4,272 in 730 households. There were 4,245 inhabitants in 1,170 households at the following census of 2011. The 2016 census measured the population of the rural district as 4,117 in 1,084 households. The most populous of its 16 villages was Deh Shams-e Bozorg, with 779 people.

=== Other villages in the rural district ===
- Bala Gir
- Chahar Bot
- Chaparabad
- Deh Gorji
- Deh Shams-e Kuchak
- Do Ab
- Hasanabad
- Kohneh Qaleh
- Qarah Soqol
- Sar Darreh
- Sar Giz
