= Nalus =

City in West Azerbaijan province, Iran

Nalus Persian: نالوس
- City
- Location within Iran
- Coordinates: 36°59′00″N 45°08′38″E
- Country: Iran
- Province: West Azerbaijan
- County: Oshnavieh
- District: Nalus
- Established as a city: 2000

Population (2016)
  - Total: 2,973
- Time zone: UTC+3:30 (IRST)

Nalus (Persian: نالوس) (Note: Also romanized as Nālūs) is a city in, and the capital of, Nalus District in Oshnavieh County, West Azerbaijan province, Iran. It also serves as the administrative center for Oshnavieh-ye Jonubi Rural District. (Note: Formerly Godar Rural District) The village of Nalus was converted to a city in 2000.

== Demographics ==
=== Population ===
At the time of the 2006 National Census, the city's population was 2,488 in 533 households. The following census in 2011 counted 2,938 people in 669 households. The 2016 census measured the population of the city as 2,973 people in 778 households.
