= Gombaz =

Gombaz (Persian: گمبز) may refer to:

- Gonbad or Gonbaz/Gombaz/Gumbaz, a type of Persian dome
- Gombaz, Fars, a village in Fars province, Iran
- Gombaz, Sistan and Baluchestan, a village in Sistan and Baluchestan province, Iran
- Gumbaz, Srirangapatna, an Islamic mausoleum in Karnataka, India

== See also ==
- Gonbad (disambiguation)
- Gumuz (disambiguation)
