= Siavan, Salmas =

Siavan سياوان
- Village
- Location within Iran
- Coordinates: 38°02′39″N 44°34′45″E
- Country: Iran
- Province: West Azerbaijan
- County: Salmas
- Bakhsh: Kuhsar
- Rural District: Chahriq

Population (2006)
  - Total: 214
- Time zone: UTC+3:30 (IRST)
  - Summer (DST): UTC+4:30 (IRDT)

Siavan (Persian: سياوان, also Romanized as Sīāvān, Armenian: Սիւան) is a village in Chahriq Rural District, Kuhsar District, Salmas County, West Azerbaijan Province, Iran. At the 2006 census, its population was 214, in 36 families.
