= Gonbad-e Hajji =

Gonbad-e Hajji گنبدحاجي
- Village
- Location within Iran
- Coordinates: 35°58′00″N 47°26′00″E
- Country: Iran
- Province: Kurdistan
- County: Bijar
- Bakhsh: Central
- Rural District: Howmeh

Population (2006)
  - Total: 51
- Time zone: UTC+3:30 (IRST)
  - Summer (DST): UTC+4:30 (IRDT)

Gonbad-e Hajji (Persian: گنبدحاجي, also Romanized as Gonbad-e Ḩājjī; also known as Gonbad and Gunbad) is a village in Howmeh Rural District, in the Central District of Bijar County, Kurdistan Province, Iran. At the 2006 census, its population was 51, in 10 families. The village is populated by Kurds.
