= Eslamlu Ayili =

Eslamlu Ayili اسلاملو ایلی
- Village
- Location within Iran
- Coordinates: 29°27′18″N 52°31′38″E
- Country: Iran
- Province: Fars
- County: Shiraz
- Bakhsh: Central
- Rural District: Qarah Bagh

Population (2006)
  - Total: 937
- Time zone: UTC+3:30 (IRST)
  - Summer (DST): UTC+4:30 (IRDT)

Eslamlu Ayili (Persian: اسلاملو ایلی, also Romanized as Eslāmlū Āyīlī; also known as Eslāmlū, Eslāmlū Chowyān, and Eslāmlū Chūpān) is a village in Qarah Bagh Rural District, in the Central District of Shiraz County, Fars province, Iran. At the 2006 census, its population was 937, in 209 families.
