= Gonbad-e Sorkh, Bandar Abbas =

Gonbad-e Sorkh گنبدسرخ
- Village
- Location within Iran
- Coordinates: 27°25′40″N 56°45′40″E
- Country: Iran
- Province: Hormozgan
- County: Bandar Abbas
- Bakhsh: Takht
- Rural District: Shamil

Population (2006)
  - Total: 46
- Time zone: UTC+3:30 (IRST)
  - Summer (DST): UTC+4:30 (IRDT)

Gonbad-e Sorkh (Persian: گنبدسرخ; also known as Gonbad-e Sorkhī and Gonbad Sorkhī) is a village in Shamil Rural District, Takht District, Bandar Abbas County, Hormozgan Province, Iran. At the 2006 census, its population was 46, in 14 families.
