= Gonbad-e Mahuiyeh =

Gonbad-e Mahuiyeh گنبدماهوييه
- Village
- Location within Iran
- Coordinates: 29°28′16″N 56°25′28″E
- Country: Iran
- Province: Kerman
- County: Baft
- Bakhsh: Central
- Rural District: Gughar

Population (2006)
  - Total: 21
- Time zone: UTC+3:30 (IRST)
  - Summer (DST): UTC+4:30 (IRDT)

Gonbad-e Mahuiyeh (Persian: گنبدماهوييه, also Romanized as Gonbad-e Māhū’īyeh) is a village in Gughar Rural District, in the Central District of Baft County, Kerman Province, Iran. At the 2006 census, its population was 21, in 8 families.
