= Gonbad Kabud Mosque =

Mosque in Kalat, Razavi Khorasan, Iran

Kabud Gonbad Mosque
- مسجد كبود گنبد
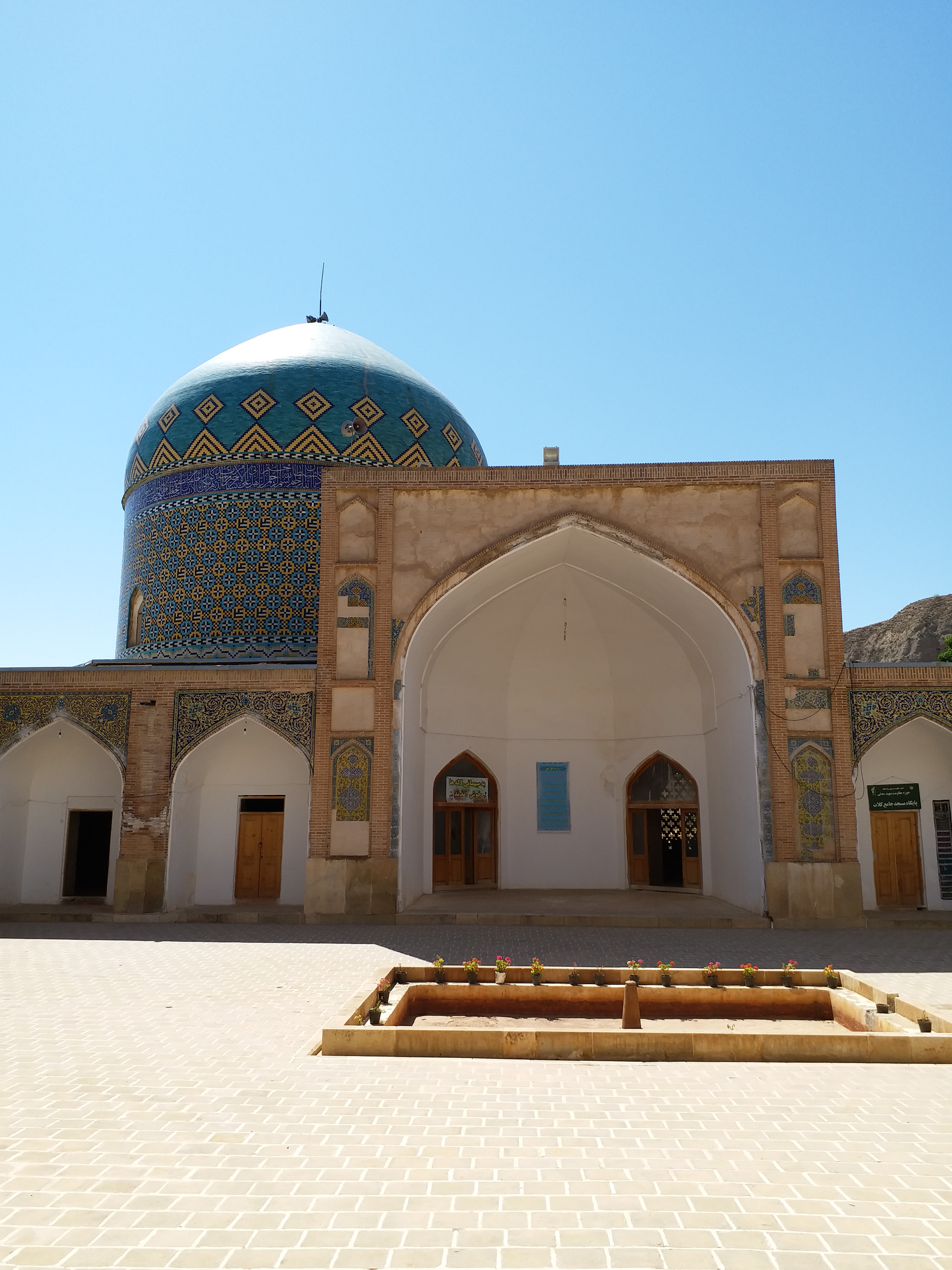
- The mosque in 2021, viewed from the sahn

- Location of the mosque in Iran

Religion
- Affiliation: Shia Islam
- Ecclesiastical or organisational status: Mosque
- Status: Active

Location
- Location: Kalat, Kalat County, Razavi Khorasan province
- Country: Iran
- Coordinates: 36°59′40″N 59°46′13″E

Architecture
- Type: Mosque architecture
- Style: Seljuk; Afsharid; Persian; Qajar; Ilkhanid
- Completed: 12th century (original); 1747 (remodelled); 1835 (renovation)

Specifications
- Domes: One (large); Uncountable (small)
- Materials: Bricks; mortar; tiles

Iran National Heritage List
- Official name: Kabud Gonbad Mosque
- Type: Mosque
- Designated: 1967
- Reference no.: 611
- Conservation organization: Cultural Heritage, Handicrafts and Tourism Organization of Iran

The Gonbad Kabud Mosque (Persian: مسجد كبود گنبد, lit. 'Blue Dome Mosque'), also known as the Kabud Gonbad Mosque and the Naderi Mosque, is a mosque located in Kalat, in the Kalat County, Razavi Khorasan province, Iran. The mosque structure dates from the Seljuk and Afsharid periods, and was renovated during the Qajar era.

The mosque was added to the Iran National Heritage List on 12 April 1967, administered by the Cultural Heritage, Handicrafts and Tourism Organization of Iran.

== History ==
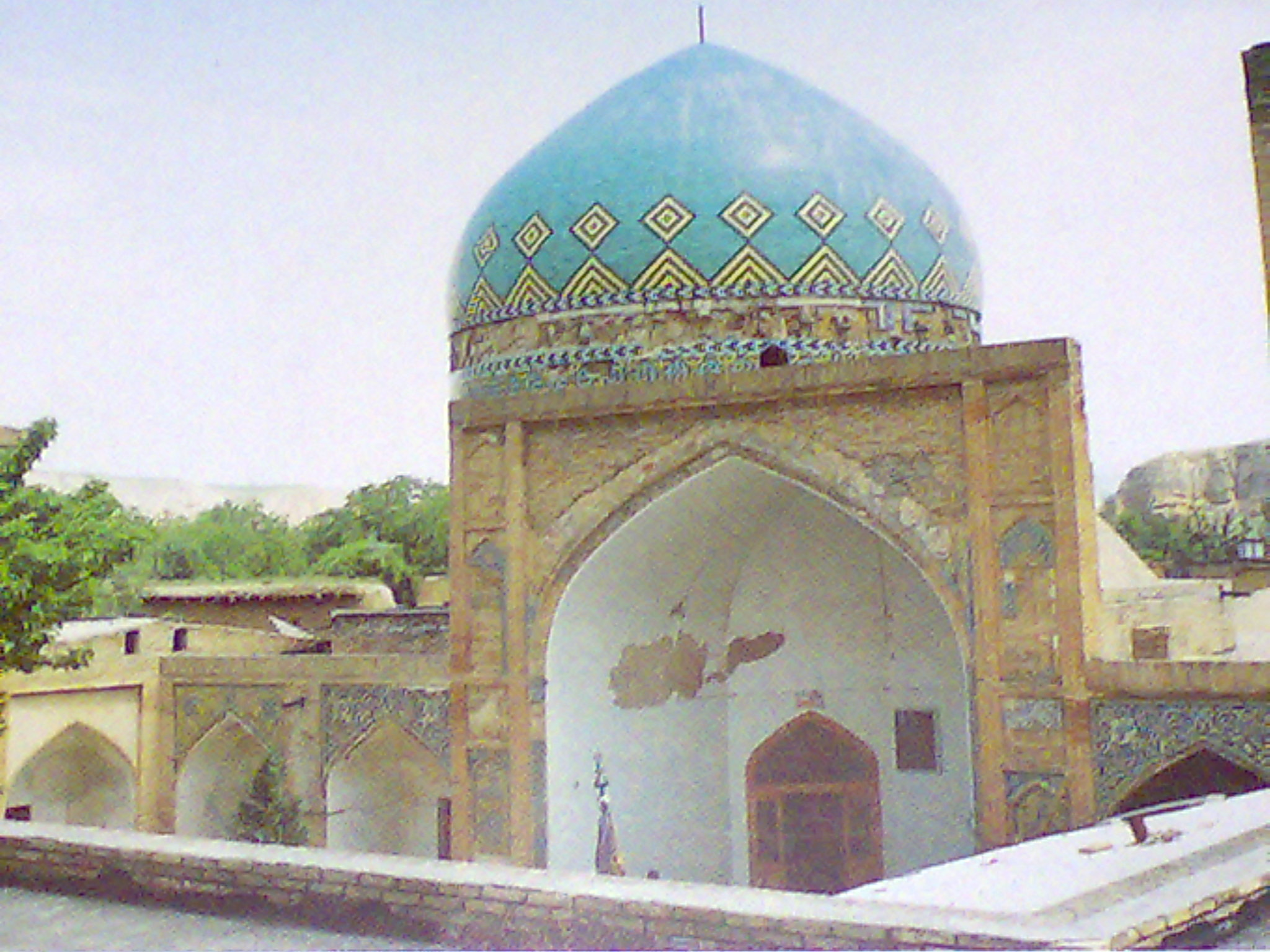
The mosque in 2007

The original mosque structure was built by the Seljuks in the 12th century. During the rule of the Ilkhanate, a mausoleum was added to the grounds of the mosque. After the takeover of Iran by Nader Shah Afshar, he expanded the mosque and built porches and shelters around it. It is also said that the Mongol Jalairs, who governed parts of Iran under the supervision of other bigger powers ruling over Iran ever since their subjugation into the Aq Qoyunlu, helped with some of the renovations. The mosque was also remodelled with a style more evocative of Persian architecture in 1747. Later during the Qajar period, the mosque received extensive renovations. More repairs and restorations took place in 1835 under orders from Yalangtush Khan, the governor of Kalat.

== Architecture ==
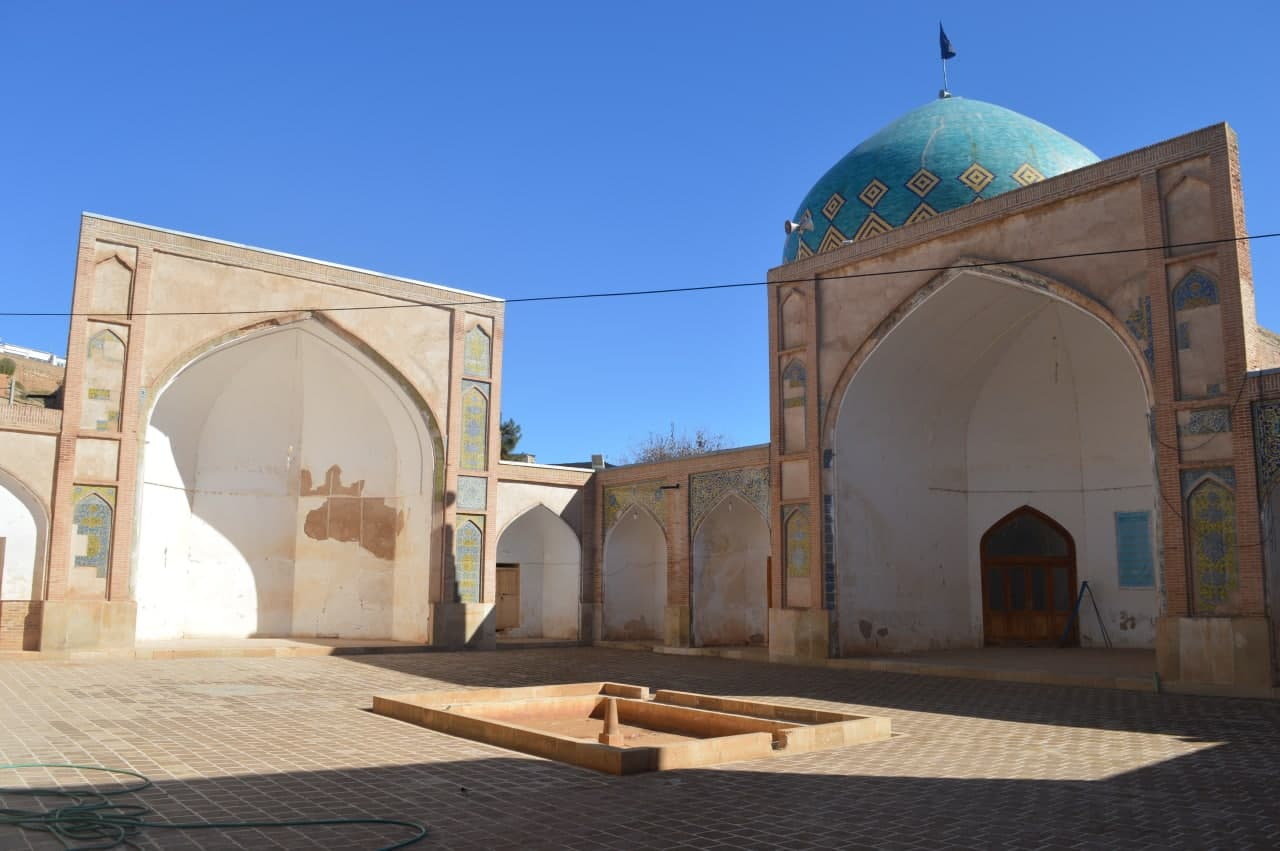
The mosque, viewed from inside its sahn

The mosque has four main iwans and is topped primarily by a large blue dome. Significant fragments of yellow-and-blue tiling remain on the four iwans. The base of this dome is cylindrical, while the space underneath the dome is octagonal, with each wall approximately 4 metres (13 ft) long. The sahn is rectangular, and measures 19 metres (62 ft) wide and 27 metres (89 ft) long. Next to the eastern shabestan, there is a tomb for the family of the Mongol Jalairs, dating from the Ilkhanid era. One of the rooms was converted into a memorial and a mausoleum, where several martyrs of the Iranian Revolution who died in Kalat were buried.

== Gallery ==
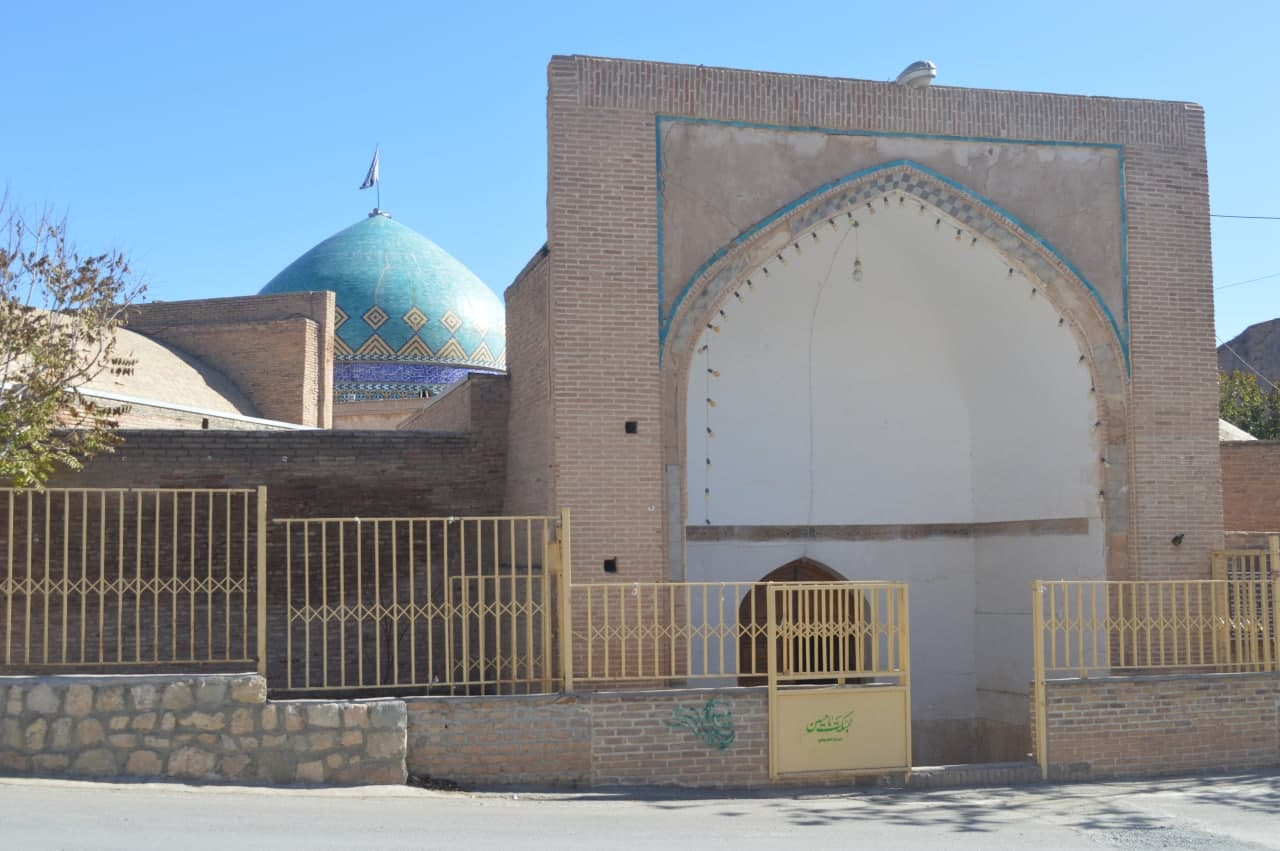
Main entrance of the mosque

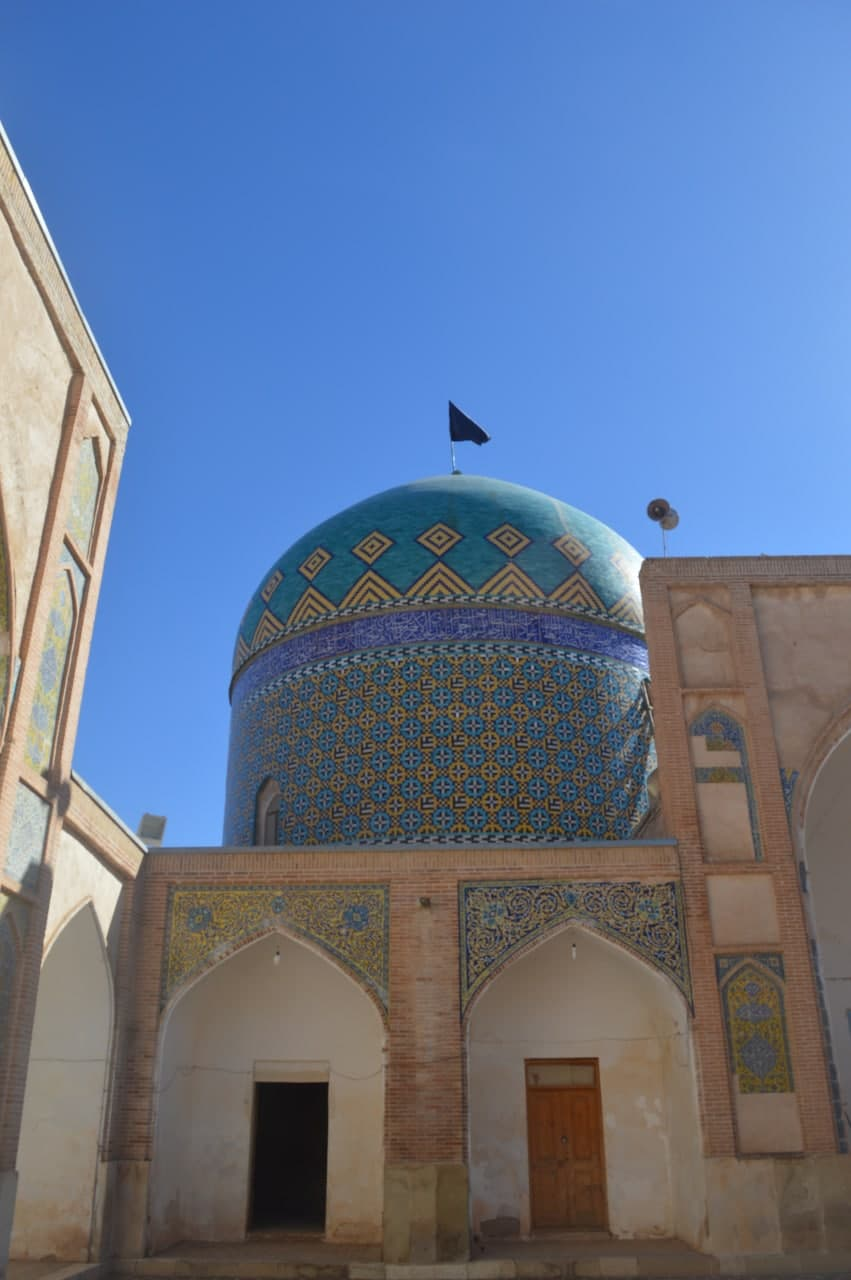
The mosque's blue dome

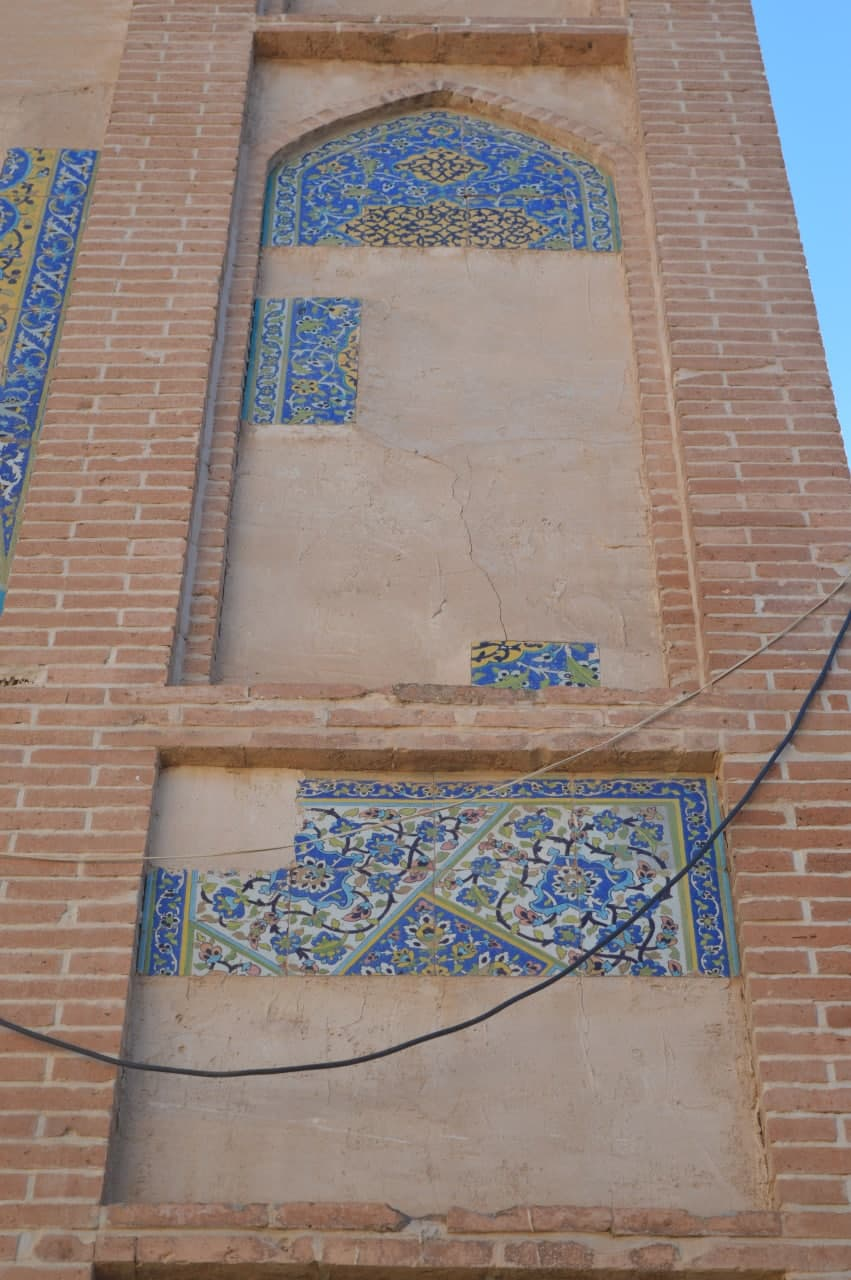
Ruined and unfinished tiling work on one of the iwans

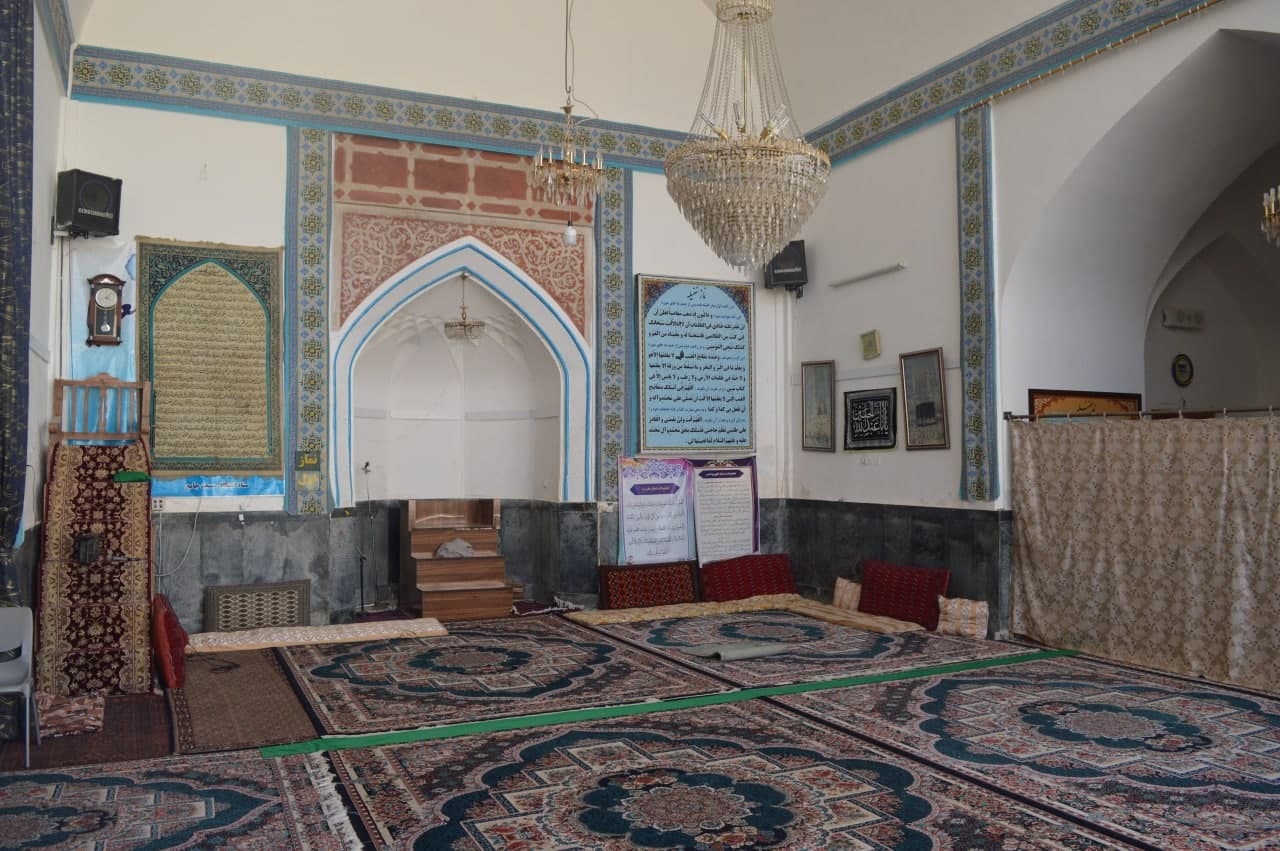
Inside one of the prayer halls, with a mihrab visible

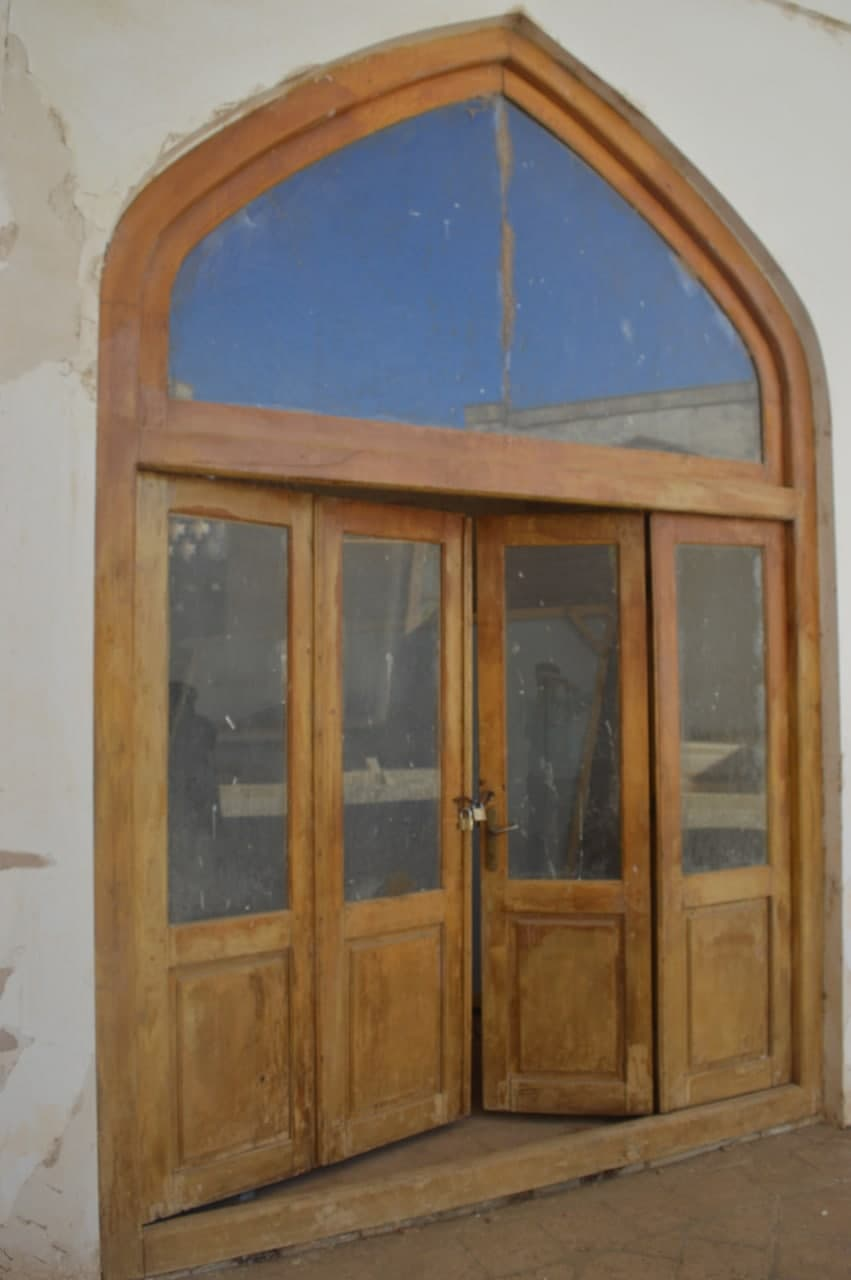
A wooden door that leads to the mausoleum of the martyrs who were killed in the Iranian Revolution

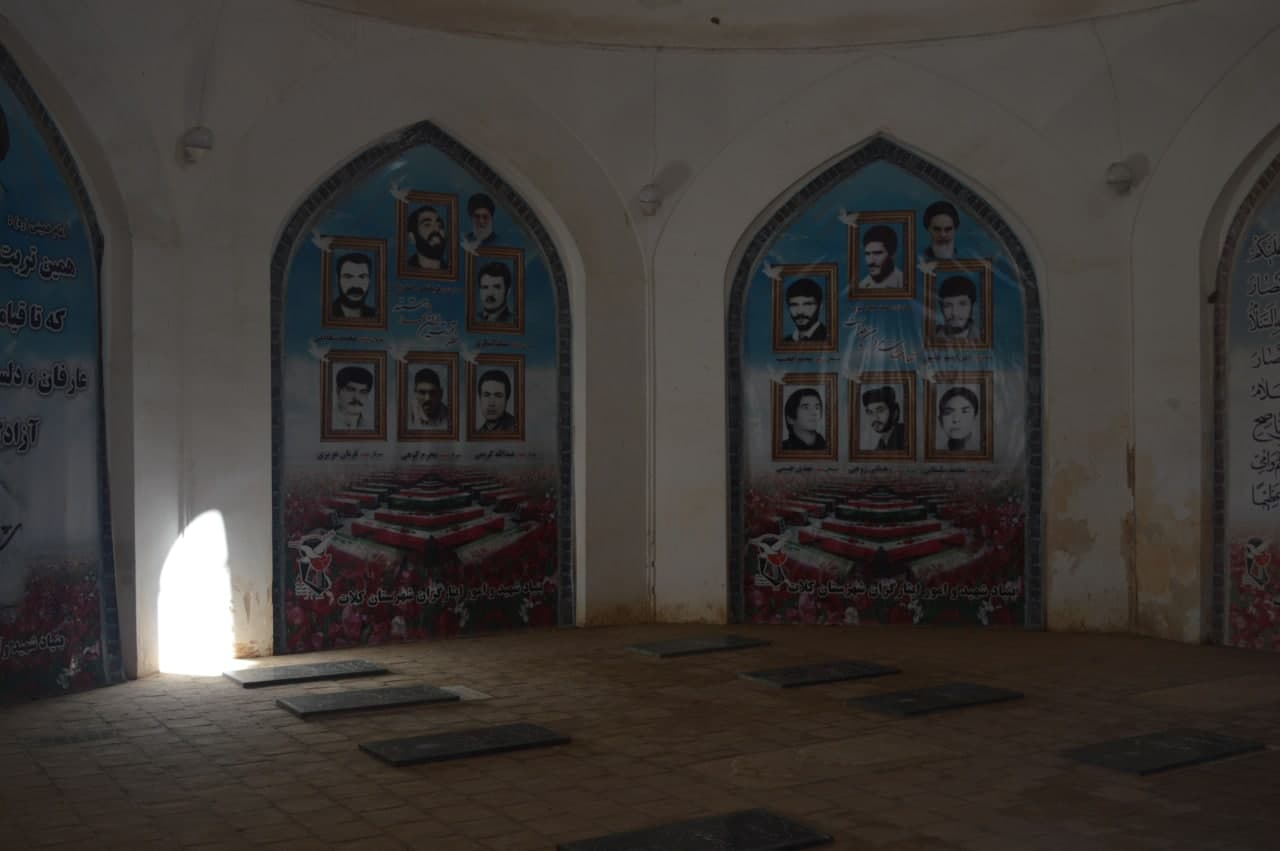
The room containing the mausoleum of the martyrs

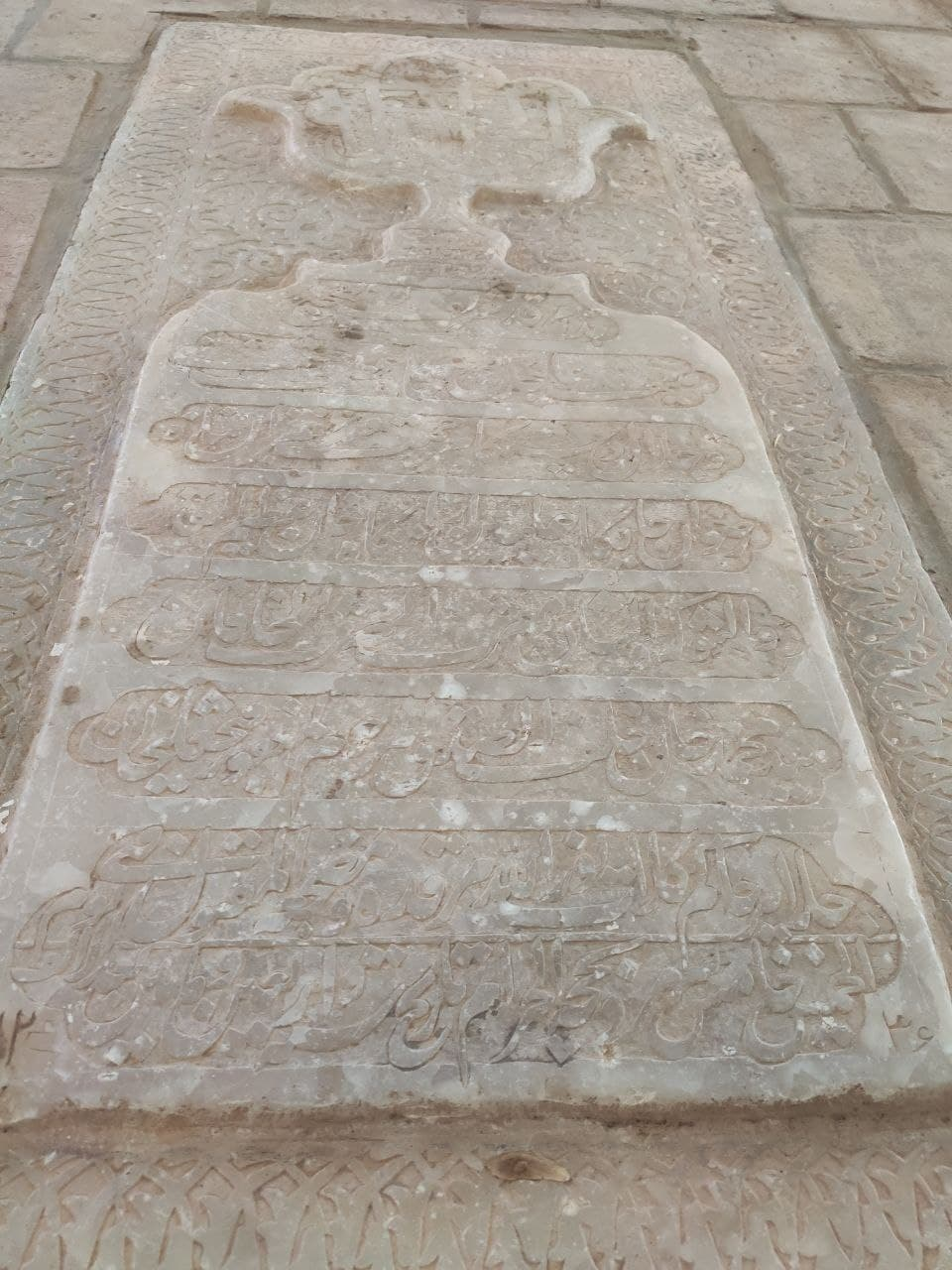
The historic Ilkhanid-period grave, located at a side of the mosque

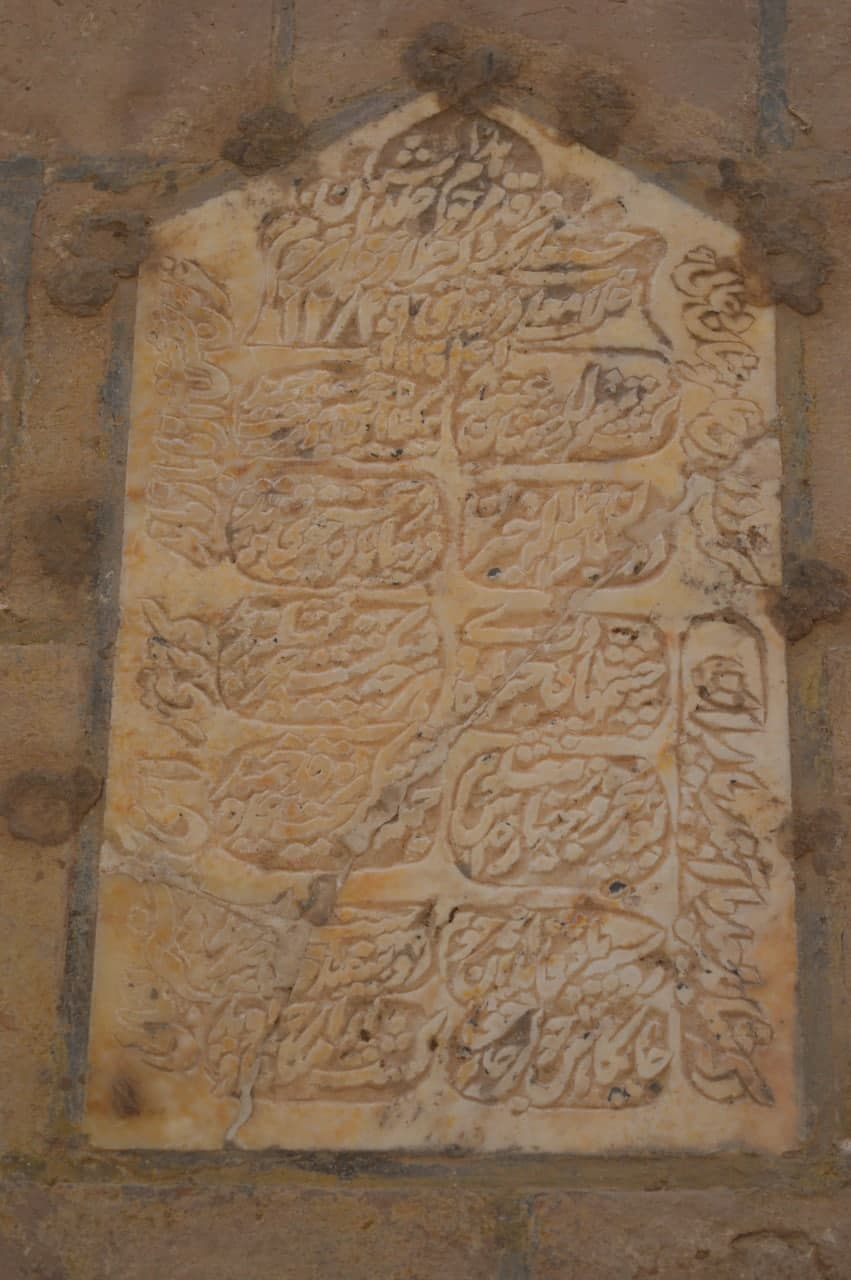
Another one of the Ilkhanid-period graves

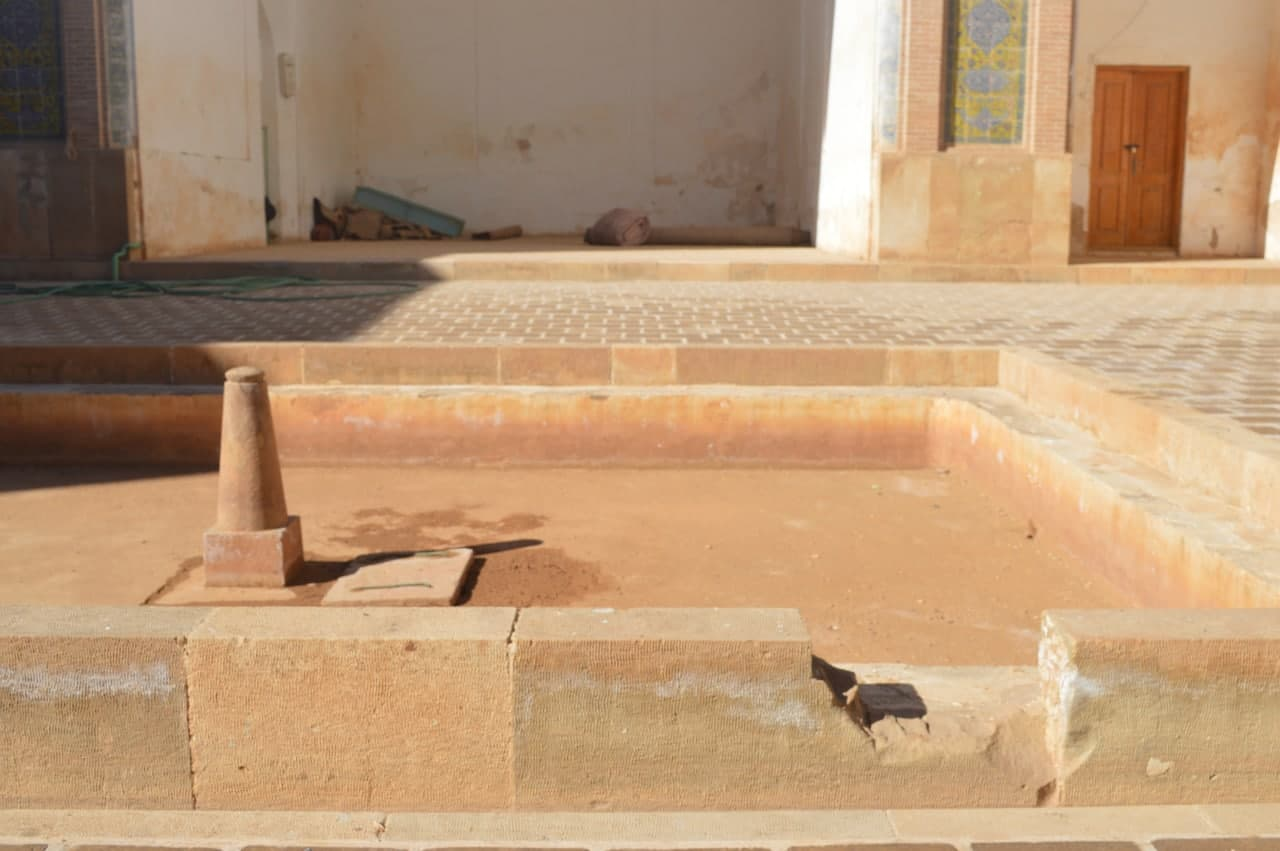
The historic fountain that is no longer functional

== See also ==
- Shia Islam in Iran
- List of mausoleums in Iran
- List of mosques in Iran
- Persian domes
