= Gonbadan, East Azerbaijan =

Gonbadan گنبدان
- Village
- Location within Iran
- Coordinates: 37°53′47″N 47°35′37″E
- Country: Iran
- Province: East Azerbaijan
- County: Sarab
- Bakhsh: Central
- Rural District: Aghmiyun

Population (2006)
  - Total: 228
- Time zone: UTC+3:30 (IRST)
  - Summer (DST): UTC+4:30 (IRDT)

Gonbadan (Persian: گنبدان, also Romanized as Gonbadān) is a village in Aghmiyun Rural District, in the Central District of Sarab County, East Azerbaijan Province, Iran. At the 2006 census, its population was 228, in 60 families.
