= Alian-e Sofla =

Alian-e Sofla عليانسفلي
- Village
- Location within Iran
- Coordinates: 32°50′09″N 59°49′33″E
- Country: Iran
- Province: South Khorasan
- County: Darmian
- Bakhsh: Central
- Rural District: Darmian

Population (2006)
  - Total: 30
- Time zone: UTC+3:30 (IRST)
  - Summer (DST): UTC+4:30 (IRDT)

Alian-e Sofla (Persian: عليانسفلي, also Romanized as ‘Alīān-e Soflá; also known as ‘Aleyān and ‘Alīān) is a village in Darmian Rural District, in the Central District of Darmian County, South Khorasan Province, Iran. At the 2006 census, its population was 30, in 7 families.
