= Alian, Semnan =

Village in Semnan province, Iran

Alian Persian: عليان
- Village
- Location within Iran
- Coordinates: 35°54′26″N 54°16′54″E
- Country: Iran
- Province: Semnan
- County: Damghan
- District: Amirabad
- Rural District: Qohab-e Rastaq

Population (2016)
  - Total: 220
- Time zone: UTC+3:30 (IRST)

Alian (Persian: عليان) (Note: Also romanized as ‘Alīān, Alīyān, and ‘Alyan) is a village in Qohab-e Rastaq Rural District of Amirabad District in Damghan County, Semnan province, Iran.

== Demographics ==
=== Population ===
At the time of the 2006 National Census, the village's population was 105 in 41 households. The following census in 2011 counted 76 people in 31 households. The 2016 census measured the population of the village as 220 people in 80 households.
