= Gonbad-e Sorkh, Minab =

Gonbad-e Sorkh گنبدسرخ
- Village
- Location within Iran
- Coordinates: 27°00′10″N 57°24′44″E
- Country: Iran
- Province: Hormozgan
- County: Minab
- Bakhsh: Senderk
- Rural District: Bondar

Population (2006)
  - Total: 196
- Time zone: UTC+3:30 (IRST)
  - Summer (DST): UTC+4:30 (IRDT)

Gonbad-e Sorkh (Persian: گنبدسرخ) is a village in Bondar Rural District, Senderk District, Minab County, Hormozgan Province, Iran.

== Demographics ==
At the 2006 census, its population was 196, in 38 families.
