= Eslamlu, Urmia =

Eslamlu اسلاملو
- Village
- Location within Iran
- Coordinates: 37°30′46″N 45°13′00″E
- Country: Iran
- Province: West Azerbaijan
- County: Urmia
- Bakhsh: Central
- Rural District: Bakeshluchay

Population (2006)
  - Total: 331
- Time zone: UTC+3:30 (IRST)
  - Summer (DST): UTC+4:30 (IRDT)

Eslamlu (Persian: اسلاملو, also Romanized as Eslāmlū) is a village in Bakeshluchay Rural District, in the Central District of Urmia County, West Azerbaijan Province, Iran. At the 2006 census, its population was 331, in 110 families.
