= Kani Sorkh, Kurdistan =

Kani Sorkh كاني سرخ
- Village
- Location within Iran
- Coordinates: 36°12′52″N 46°48′48″E
- Country: Iran
- Province: Kurdistan
- County: Saqqez
- Bakhsh: Ziviyeh
- Rural District: Tilakuh

Population (2006)
  - Total: 232
- Time zone: UTC+3:30 (IRST)
  - Summer (DST): UTC+4:30 (IRDT)

Kani Sorkh (Persian: كاني سرخ, also Romanized as Kānī Sorkh) is a village in Tilakuh Rural District, Ziviyeh District, Saqqez County, Kurdistan Province, Iran. According to the 2006 census, the village had a population of 232, comprising 48 families. The village is populated by Kurds.
