= Gonbad, Khuzestan =

Gonbad گنبد
- Village
- Location within Iran
- Coordinates: 31°26′51″N 49°59′38″E
- Country: Iran
- Province: Khuzestan
- County: Bagh-e Malek
- Bakhsh: Central
- Rural District: Haparu

Population (2006)
  - Total: 279
- Time zone: UTC+3:30 (IRST)
  - Summer (DST): UTC+4:30 (IRDT)

Gonbad (Persian: گنبد) is a village in Haparu Rural District, in the Central District of Bagh-e Malek County, Khuzestan Province, Iran. At the 2006 census, its population was 279, in 46 families.
