= Alians (band) =

Polish punk-rock, reggae and ska band

Alians is a Polish punk-rock, reggae and ska band, founded in 1990 in Piła. Alians' first concert took place on May 19, 1990, in Bydgoszcz, with three founding members: Rafał Kasprzak (guit, voc.), Michał Thiede (bg) and Dariusz Kułak (drums). The band features punky reggae - a unique mix of the three kinds of music mentioned above. Apart from usual instruments, such as guitars, bass and drums, its members also use trumpets, accordion, trombone and saxophone. Alians is known for its politically engaged lyrics, inspired by such bands as The Clash and Dead Kennedys and by Anarchism as well as left-wing political movements from Latin America.

Until November 2007, Alians has played 470 concerts, not only in Poland, but also in several countries of Europe (Germany, Belgium, the Netherlands, Slovakia, Norway, Lithuania, England), together with such groups as Fugazi, The Ukrainians, No Means No and Chumbawamba. Even though the band is regarded as one of the most popular underground groups in Poland, its popularity is limited, as it is not featured in mainstream mass-media.

== Discography ==
- Sami wobec siebie (1990)
- Mega Yoga (1991)
- Gavroche (1994)
- Cała anarchia mieści się w uliczniku (1996)
- W samo południe (1998)
- Równe prawa (2000)
- Pełnia (2003)
- Nielegalni (2007)
- Egzystencjalna rzeźnia (2010)

== Members ==
- Rafał "Kazi" Kasprzak – guitar, vocals
- Tomasz "Korabol" Kułak – accordion
- Magdalena Czerwińska – keyboard instruments
- Jacek "Global" Pióro – bass guitar
- Rafał "Czajnik" Czajkowski – guitar
- Marcin "Gwizdek" Gwizdun – trombone
- Tomasz "Guma" Kumiega – saxophone
- Mirosław Chojnacki – drums
- Mariusz Pałaszyński – trumpet

== Past members ==
- Michał "Dósiołek" Thiede – vocals, bass guitar, melodica
- Darek "Q" Kułak – drums
- Bartosz "Szkodnik" Klink – trumpet
- Sebastian "Anem" Czajkowski – keyboard instruments
- Paweł Czaja – drums
- Grzegorz "Świeca" Oświeciński – trumpet
