= Gonbad, Khoy =

Gonbad گنبد
- Village
- Location within Iran
- Coordinates: 38°29′44″N 44°53′45″E
- Country: Iran
- Province: West Azerbaijan
- County: Khoy
- Bakhsh: Central
- Rural District: Rahal

Population (2006)
  - Total: 132
- Time zone: UTC+3:30 (IRST)
  - Summer (DST): UTC+4:30 (IRDT)

Gonbad (Persian: گنبد) is a village in Rahal Rural District, in the Central District of Khoy County, West Azerbaijan Province, Iran. At the 2006 census, its population was 132, in 27 families.
