= Gonbadeh-e Olya =

Gonbadeh-e Olya گنبده عليا
- Village
- Location within Iran
- Coordinates: 34°49′52″N 46°51′34″E
- Country: Iran
- Province: Kurdistan
- County: Kamyaran
- Bakhsh: Central
- Rural District: Shahu

Population (2006)
  - Total: 73
- Time zone: UTC+3:30 (IRST)
  - Summer (DST): UTC+4:30 (IRDT)

Gonbadeh-e Olya (Persian: گنبده عليا, also Romanized as Gonbadeh-e ‘Olyā; also known as Gonbad-e Bālā and Gonbadeh-ye Bālā) is a village in Shahu Rural District, in the Central District of Kamyaran County, Kurdistan Province, Iran. At the 2006 census, its population was 73, in 13 families. The village is populated by Kurds.
