= Gonbad, Malayer =

Gonbad گنبد
- Village
- Location within Iran
- Coordinates: 34°19′43″N 48°42′48″E
- Country: Iran
- Province: Hamadan
- County: Malayer
- Bakhsh: Central
- Rural District: Haram Rud-e Olya

Population (2006)
  - Total: 201
- Time zone: UTC+3:30 (IRST)
  - Summer (DST): UTC+4:30 (IRDT)

Gonbad (Persian: گنبد; also known as Gumbad and Gunbad) is a village in Haram Rud-e Olya Rural District, in the Central District of Malayer County, Hamadan Province, Iran. At the 2006 census, its population was 201, in 52 families.
