= Dasht-e Bil Rural District =

Rural district in West Azerbaijan province, Iran

Dasht-e Bil Rural District Persian: دهستان دشت بيل
- Rural District
- Location within Iran
- Coordinates: 37°09′N 45°01′E
- Country: Iran
- Province: West Azerbaijan
- County: Oshnavieh
- District: Central
- Established: 1987
- Capital: Agh Bolagh

Population (2016)
  - Total: 9,178
- Time zone: UTC+3:30 (IRST)

Dasht-e Bil Rural District (Persian: دهستان دشت بيل) is in the Central District of Oshnavieh County, West Azerbaijan province, Iran. Its capital is the village of Agh Bolagh. The previous capital of the rural district was the village of Nalivan, now in Oshnavieh-ye Shomali Rural District.

== Demographics ==
=== Population ===
At the time of the 2006 National Census, the rural district's population was 8,271 in 1,751 households. There were 9,096 inhabitants in 2,394 households at the following census of 2011. The 2016 census measured the population of the rural district as 9,178 in 2,355 households. The most populous of its 21 villages was Agh Bolagh, with 1,295 people.

=== Other villages in the rural district ===
- Dowrbeh
- Dustak
- Eslamlu
- Gelaz
- Gond-e Molla Isa
- Lowlakan
- Sar Kani
- Siavan
