= Haq Rural District =

Rural district in West Azerbaijan province, Iran

Haq Rural District Persian: دهستان هق
- Rural District
- Location within Iran
- Coordinates: 36°58′N 45°02′E
- Country: Iran
- Province: West Azerbaijan
- County: Oshnavieh
- District: Nalus
- Established: 1996
- Capital: Haq

Population (2016)
  - Total: 9,168
- Time zone: UTC+3:30 (IRST)

Haq Rural District (Persian: دهستان هق) is in Nalus District of Oshnavieh County, West Azerbaijan province, Iran. Its capital is the village of Haq.

== Demographics ==
=== Population ===
At the time of the 2006 National Census, the rural district's population was 8,556 in 1,472 households. There were 8,824 inhabitants in 2,258 households at the following census of 2011. The 2016 census measured the population of the rural district as 9,168 in 2,257 households. The most populous of its 18 villages was Sengan, with 1,198 people.

=== Other villages in the rural district ===
- Bamzurteh
- Dorud
- Kani Rash
- Kani Sorkh
- Mirabad
- Sheykhan
- Sufian
