= Oshnavieh-ye Shomali Rural District =

Rural district in West Azerbaijan province, Iran

Oshnavieh-ye Shomali Rural District Persian: دهستان اشنويه شمالي
- Rural District
- Location within Iran
- Coordinates: 37°04′N 45°08′E
- Country: Iran
- Province: West Azerbaijan
- County: Oshnavieh
- District: Central
- Established: 1990
- Capital: Nalivan

Population (2016)
  - Total: 8,649
- Time zone: UTC+3:30 (IRST)

Oshnavieh-ye Shomali Rural District (Persian: دهستان اشنويه شمالي) is in the Central District of Oshnavieh County, West Azerbaijan province, Iran. Its capital is the village of Nalivan.

== Demographics ==
=== Population ===
At the time of the 2006 National Census, the rural district's population was 10,315 in 1,940 households. There were 12,204 inhabitants in 3,155 households at the following census of 2011. The 2016 census measured the population of the rural district as 8,649 in 2,195 households. The most populous of its 26 villages was Nalivan, with 1,186 people.

=== Other villages in the rural district ===
- Aliabad
- Bizhabad
- Gerd-e Kashan
- Gond-e Vila
- Hasan Nuran
- Shahvaneh
- Sujeh
