= Nalus District =

District in West Azerbaijan province, Iran

Nalus District Persian: بخش نالوس
- District
- Location within Iran
- Coordinates: 36°58′N 45°05′E
- Country: Iran
- Province: West Azerbaijan
- County: Oshnavieh
- Established: 1996
- Capital: Nalus

Population (2016)
  - Total: 16,258
- Time zone: UTC+3:30 (IRST)

Nalus District (Persian: بخش نالوس) is in Oshnavieh County, West Azerbaijan province, Iran. Its capital is the city of Nalus.

== Demographics ==
=== Population ===
At the time of the 2006 National Census, the district's population was 15,316 in 2,735 households. The following census in 2011 counted 16,007 people in 4,097 households. The 2016 census measured the population of the district as 16,258 inhabitants in 4,119 households.

=== Administrative divisions ===
Nalus District Population
Administrative Divisions	2006	2011	2016
Haq RD	8,556	8,824	9,168
Oshnavieh-ye Jonubi RD (Note: Formerly Godar Rural District)	4,272	4,245	4,117
Nalus (city)	2,488	2,938	2,973
Total	15,316	16,007	16,258
RD = Rural District
