= Central District (Oshnavieh County) =

District in West Azerbaijan province, Iran

Central District (Oshnavieh County) Persian: بخش مرکزی شهرستان اشنویه
- District
- Location within Iran
- Coordinates: 37°08′N 45°01′E
- Country: Iran
- Province: West Azerbaijan
- County: Oshnavieh
- Established: 1996
- Capital: Oshnavieh

Population (2016)
  - Total: 57,628
- Time zone: UTC+3:30 (IRST)

The Central District of Oshnavieh County (Persian: بخش مرکزی شهرستان اشنویه) is in West Azerbaijan province, Iran. Its capital is the city of Oshnavieh.

== Demographics ==
=== Population ===
At the time of the 2006 National Census, the district's population was 48,482 in 10,263 households. The following census in 2011 counted 54,023 people in 13,698 households. The 2016 census measured the population of the district as 57,628 inhabitants in 15,217 households.

=== Administrative divisions ===
Central District (Oshnavieh County) Population
Administrative Divisions	2006	2011	2016
Dasht-e Bil RD	8,271	9,096	9,178
Oshnavieh-ye Shomali RD	10,315	12,204	8,649
Oshnavieh (city)	29,896	32,723	39,801
Total	48,482	54,023	57,628
RD = Rural District
