= Oshnavieh County =

County in West Azerbaijan province, Iran

Oshnavieh County Persian: شهرستان اشنویه
- County
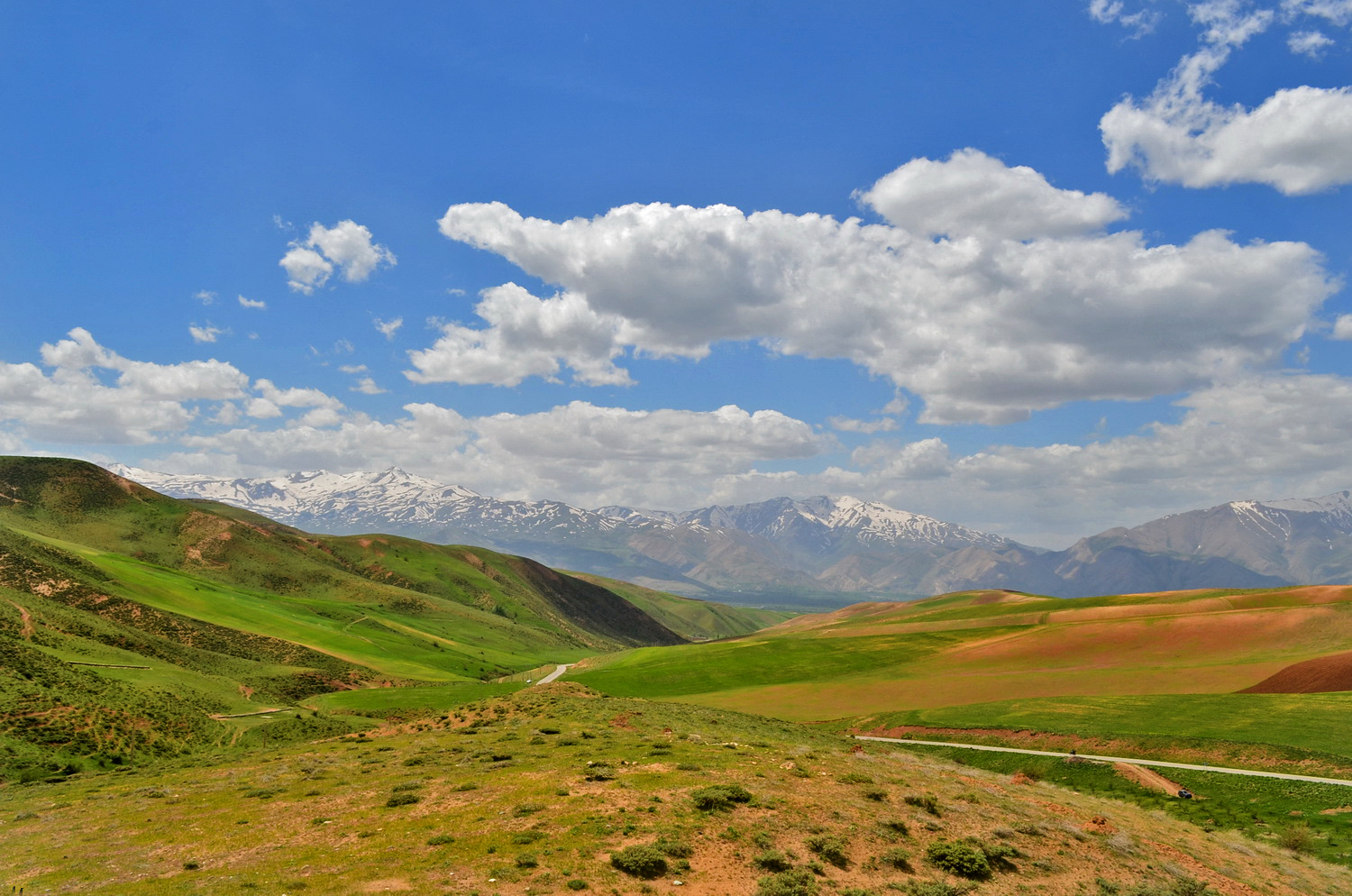
- Zharabad Road

- Location of Oshnavieh County in West Azerbaijan province (center left, yellow)

- Location of West Azerbaijan province in Iran
- Coordinates: 37°04′N 45°05′E
- Country: Iran
- Province: West Azerbaijan
- Established: 1996
- Capital: Oshnavieh
- Districts: Central, Nalus

Population (2016)
  - Total: 73,886
- Time zone: UTC+3:30 (IRST)

Oshnavieh County (Persian: شهرستان اشنویه) (Note: Kurdish: 'اشنۆ'شنۆ'شنه‌) is in West Azerbaijan province, Iran. Its capital is the city of Oshnavieh.

== History ==
During the Iran-Iraq war, the Ba'athist Iraq regime bombarded some parts of Oshnavieh in West Azerbaijan province (on 2 August 1988) by Chemical bombs, and about 2700 persons were injured as a result of that.

== Demographics ==
=== Population ===
At the time of the 2006 National Census, the county's population was 63,798 in 12,998 households. The following census in 2011 counted 70,030 people in 17,778 households. The 2016 census measured the population of the county as 73,886 in 19,336 households.

=== Administrative divisions ===
Oshnavieh County's population history and administrative structure over three consecutive censuses are shown in the following table.

Oshnavieh County Population
Administrative Divisions	2006	2011	2016
Central District	48,482	54,023	57,628
Dasht-e Bil RD	8,271	9,096	9,178
Oshnavieh-ye Shomali RD	10,315	12,204	8,649
Oshnavieh (city)	29,896	32,723	39,801
Nalus District	15,316	16,007	16,258
Haq RD	8,556	8,824	9,168
Oshnavieh-ye Jonubi RD (Note: Formerly Godar Rural District)	4,272	4,245	4,117
Nalus (city)	2,488	2,938	2,973
Total	63,798	70,030	73,886
RD = Rural District

== Geography ==
The county lies west of Lake Urmia about 1,300 metres above sea level, on the border with the Kurdish provinces of Iraq. The county is surrounded by high mountains which remain cool even at the height of summer.

== See also ==
Media related to Oshnavieh County at Wikimedia Commons
