= Sangar =

Sangar may refer to:

== Places ==
=== Iran ===
- Sangar, Darab, Fars Province
- Sangar, Sepidan, Fars Province
- Sang Kar, Fars, also known as Sangar
- Sar Gar, Fars, also known as Sangar
- Sangar, Iran, Sangar District, Rasht County, Gilan Province
  - Sangar District
    - Sangar Rural District (Gilan Province)
- Sangar-e Chanibeh-ye Do, also known as Sangar, Khuzestan Province
- Sangar, Lorestan
- Sangar, Markazi
- Sangar, Amol, Mazandaran Province
- Sangar, Neka, Mazandaran Province
- Sangar Rural District (North Khorasan Province)
- Sangar, Razavi Khorasan
- Sangar, Maku, a village in West Azerbaijan Province
- Sangar, Oshnavieh, a village in West Azerbaijan Province

=== Elsewhere ===
- Sangar, Afghanistan
- Sangar, New South Wales, Australia
- Sangar, Sakha Republic, Russia
- Sangar railway station, Jammu district, Jammu and Kashmir, India
- Tsugaru Strait, or Strait of Sangar, in Japan

== Other uses ==
- Sangar (crater), on Mars
- Sangar (fortification), a temporary fortified position
- Sangar (name)
