= Savernake =

Savernake may refer to:

- Savernake, New South Wales, Australia
  - Savernake Station, a farm
- Savernake, Wiltshire, a civil parish in England
  - Savernake Forest, a privately owned forest, Wiltshire, England
- Savernake Low Level railway station, a closed station on the Great Western Railway between Bedwyn and Pewsey, England
- Savernake High Level railway station, former station (south of Marlborough) on the closed Midland and South Western Junction Railway, England
- Savernake (Holcombe) mansion, listed among Parktown mansions in Johannesburg, South Africa
- Viscount Savernake, title held by the heir to the Marquess of Ailesbury, United Kingdom
