= Oaklands railway line, Victoria =

Railway line in Australia

Oaklands railway

Service
- Type: Branch

History
- Work began: 1883/1886

Technical
- Line length: 64 km (40 mi) in Victoria and 61 km (38 mi) in NSW
- Track gauge: 1,435 mm (4 ft 8 1/2 in) standard gauge
- Old gauge: 1,600 mm (5 ft 3 in)
- Signalling: Train Order Working

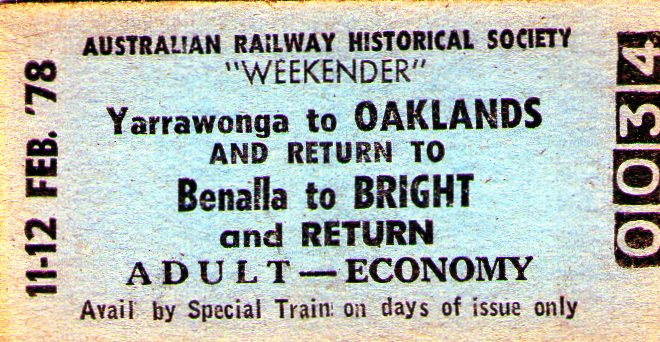
Yarrawonga-Oaklands rail ticket 1978

The Oaklands railway line is a freight-only railway line in north-eastern Victoria, Australia. The line branches from the main North East railway at Benalla station and runs across the Victoria-New South Wales border to the town of Oaklands, New South Wales.

== History ==
The first section of line opened in 1883 as a 32-kilometre (20 mi) branch line to St James, at the same time as the extension of the main line to Albury in New South Wales. In 1886, the line was extended another 32 kilometres (20 mi) to Yarrawonga, on the southern bank of the Murray River, which formed the colonial and, later, the state boundary between Victoria and New South Wales.

Under the 1922 Border Railways Act, the line was extended another 61 kilometres to Oaklands, New South Wales, where it met the existing New South Wales branch line, and Oaklands thereby became a break-of-gauge location. Although the construction of the extension was completed in 1932, trains on it were operated by the Railway Construction Branch, mostly using a rail tractor as motive power, until the line was formally handed over to the Victorian Railways in August 1938. There was no turntable at the terminus, so steam locomotives had to operate tender-first when running to Oaklands.

During World War II, additional sidings of both Victorian broad gauge and NSW standard gauge were provided, to serve Australian defence installations which were located at Oaklands. There was no passenger service to Oaklands at first but, in December 1946, a twice-weekly service began, operated by a rail motor. That service had been discontinued by the early 1950s.

The last regular passenger service on the line was between Benalla and Yarrawonga on Saturday 9 December 1978, operated by DERM 56RM.

With the opening of the North East standard gauge line in 1961, the Oaklands line had standard gauge track at both ends, in addition to the existing broad gauge line via Benalla. Gauge conversion of the Oaklands line was proposed at various times, including by the Victorian State Government in 2001, which proposed a completion date of late 2003. The last broad gauge train to run on the line was a Pacific National grain service in May 2007.

In 2008, agreement was reached to convert the North East railway line from broad gauge to standard gauge, which would have left the Oaklands branch as an isolated and unusable branch. The local MP reported that the cost of converting the 125 km (77.7 mi) branch to standard gauge was just over $13m. In October 2008, the Victorian Government announced that gauge conversion of the whole line would take place. The conversion was completed in December 2009, at a cost of $16.5 million, with nearly 50,000 sleepers replaced. The first revenue service on the converted line was an El Zorro grain train on 10 March 2010.

Since then, the line has seen numerous grain trains run by both Pacific National and Southern Shorthaul Railroad, as well as very occasional services by QUBE. The track has been allowed to deteriorate, requiring numerous emergency repairs during 2021, and there is now a 30km/h speed limit from Benalla to Oaklands. On 28 November 2021, trains were banned from using the line between the hours of 12:00 and 20:00 if the temperature at Yarrawonga was forecast to be 32 °C or higher.

== Traffic ==
The line carries seasonal grain traffic. There is no passenger service. In the 2000s, a potential new source of traffic on the line was noted, with the opening of coal mines in the area. At the time, the Coalworks company, since taken over by Whitehaven Coal, estimated that it had thermal coal reserves of 640,000,000 tonnes (629,900,000 long tons; 705,500,000 short tons) at Oaklands.

== Stations ==
- Benalla - junction
- Goorambat - silo
- Devenish - silo
- St James - silo
- Tungamah - silo
- Telford - silo
- Yarrawonga - silo

(border) Murray River bridge, replaced 1989

- Mulwala
- Sloane - silo
- Warragoon - silo
- Rennie - silo
- Sangar - silo
- Wangamong - silo
- Oaklands - AWB and GrainCorp silos

== See also ==
- Oaklands railway line, New South Wales
- Railpage Australia - Discussions and reports covering Freight Traffic on the Railway Line
- Railpage Australia - Discussions on the conversion of the line from Broad Gauge to Standard Gauge
- List of gauge conversions

== Sources ==
- NSWrail.net: List of stations and maps of the line
