= Old Cobram-Barooga Bridge =

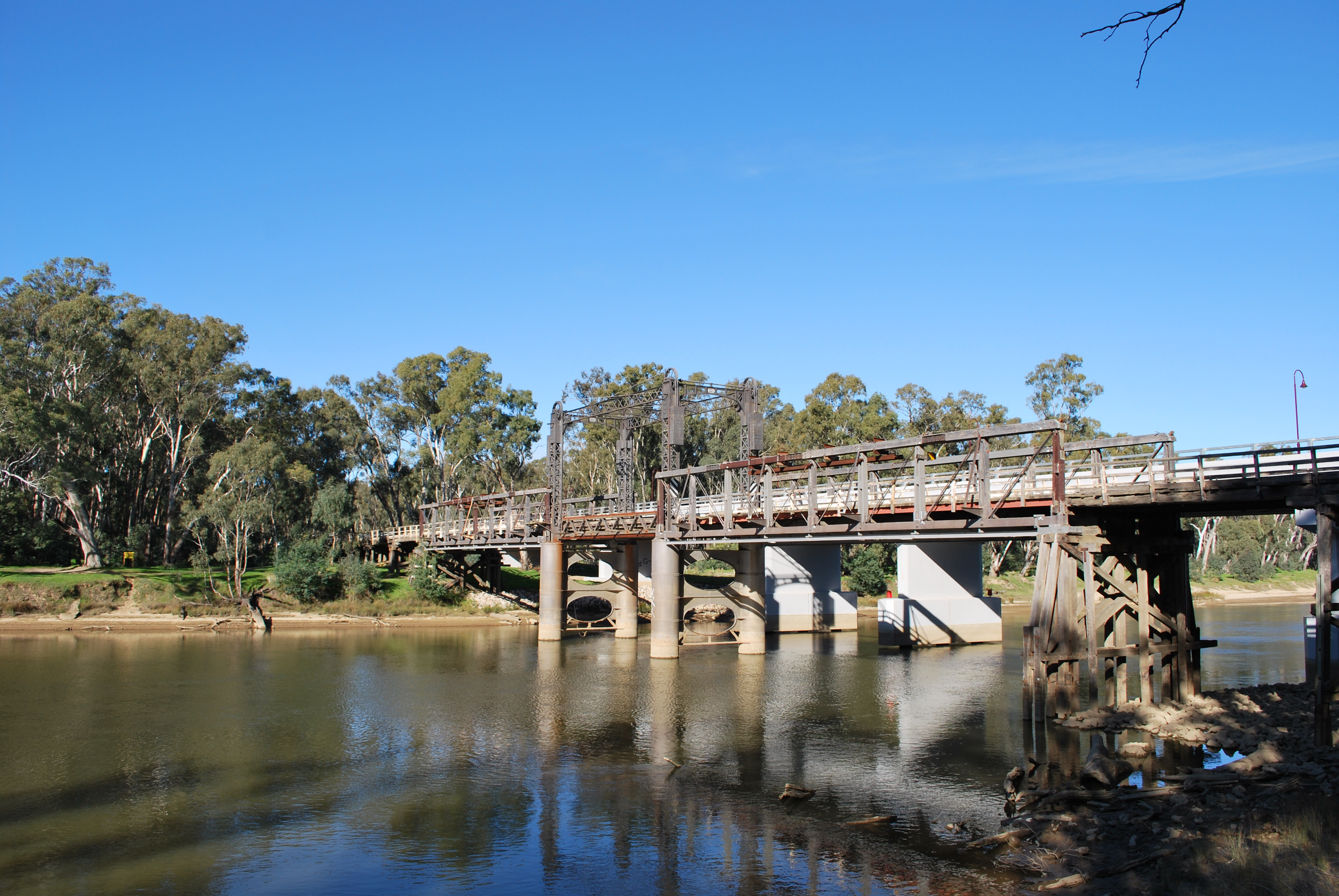

- Location within New South Wales Location within Australia
- 35.9159°S 145.6686°E
- Location: Vermont Street, Barooga, New South Wales, Australia

History
- Built: 1900–1902

Site notes
- Architect(s): Ernest de Burgh (engineer); NSW Department of Public Works
- Owner: Transport for NSW

New South Wales Heritage Register
- Official name: Old Cobram-Barooga Bridge; RMS Bridge No 3247
- Type: state heritage (built)
- Designated: 1 April 2016
- Reference no.: 1972
- Type: Road Bridge
- Category: Transport - Land

Old Cobram-Barooga Bridge is a heritage-listed former road bridge and now footbridge over the Murray River at Barooga-Cobram Road, Barooga, New South Wales, Australia. The bridge links Barooga with Cobram, its sister town in Victoria. It was designed by Ernest de Burgh (engineer) and the New South Wales Department of Public Works and built from 1900 to 1902. It is also known as RMS Bridge No 3247. It is owned by Transport for NSW. It was added to the New South Wales State Heritage Register on 1 April 2016.

== History ==
=== Timber truss bridges in New South Wales ===
The development of bridge technology and design was relatively static for thousands of years, with either simple, short bridges built of timber beams across a stream or substantial stone masonry arch bridges spanning rivers. In Australia, stone (and brick) arch bridges provided the major form of bridge until the middle of the nineteenth century, after which, local engineers turned to timber truss bridges to provide the majority of river crossings, with the (expensive) imported wrought iron bridges reserved for railways and the larger and more heavily trafficked roads. Although timber beam bridges are limited by the dimensions of available materials, timber offered the cheapest and quickest bridge solution. In NSW, the availability of excellent hardwoods provided Public Works engineers McDonald, Allan, Dare and De Burgh with a uniquely strong and durable material for timber truss bridges. Timber beam bridges served NSW well for 150 years as relatively inexpensive structures to aid the movement of goods and people.

The emergence of steel in the latter half of the nineteenth century provided a cheaper, stronger and more adaptable material for bridges than cast or wrought iron. It was rapidly adopted worldwide, its application limited only by its relative cost. In Australia, this meant that its use continued to be constrained until after local manufacture commenced in 1915. In response, the timber truss bridge designs in NSW evolved after 1899 to include steel members in critical locations such as bottom chords, whilst continuing to utilise timber for the majority of the bridge structure.

There were five main types of timber truss bridges erected in NSW, distinguished by the evolving arrangement of the primary truss members. The five types are:

1. Old Public Works Department Truss (PWD) - A basic truss bridge, based upon English models, in use from 1860 to 1886. It took advantage of the local hardwoods for its main members and was a solid and durable design

2. McDonald Truss - Built from 1886 to 1893, the McDonald truss improved upon the Old PWD type by addressing several of its particular shortcomings. These included the placement of cast-iron shoes at the junctions between timber beams, the end members were doubled and splayed for better lateral stability and wrought-iron rods were utilised for vertical tension members.

3. Allan Truss - Built from 1893 to 1929, the Allan type also used cast iron connection pieces and vertical iron rods but was a significant improvement on the McDonald type, with most main members doubled and spaced, a simplified tensioning system and using smaller individual pieces of timber.

4. De Burgh Truss - The De Burgh Truss was built from 1899 to 1905. This truss was a composite truss, utilising timber and steel in combination. It was distinguished by the use of pin-joints in the connections between the steel bottom chords and the steel diagonal rods.

5. Dare Truss - The Dare Truss is very similar to an Allan truss but used steel bottom chords. Designed by Harvey Dare and built from 1905 to 1936, the Dare Truss incorporates the best features of both the Allan Truss and the De Burgh Truss, whilst eliminating the pin-joints of the latter that proved problematic in maintenance. The Dare Truss was the most successful of the timber/steel composite trusses.

The Old Cobram-Barooga Bridge uses De Burgh Trusses. The De Burgh Truss is unique amongst the five timber truss types in NSW, as it was the first to depart from the process of evolution from the previous "standard type". The defining features included the "Pratt" truss arrangement, with timber vertical posts, timber top-chords and steel rods as inclined tension members, bottom chords formed by continuous parallel steel plates, steel plates and diagonal rods connected to the bottom chords by turned pins.

The Old Cobram-Barooga Bridge was also a movable lift-span bridge. Opening bridges were required in order to provide clearance for masted vessels. For the inland river system of the Darling, Murray and Murrumbidgee, the majority of craft were paddle-steamers and loaded barges. These craft were typically not tall and could pass under most bridges when water levels were low. However, during high water level periods, particularly floods, additional headroom was required and this was provided by an opening span over the main channel. These telescopic bridges were only suitable for small openings and, where larger ships were operating, swing-span bridges were used. Opening-span bridges were built from 1890 until 1941, after which no new opening bridges were erected on the Murray River.

=== Agriculture, Navigation and the Commonwealth ===
The context for the design and construction of the Old Cobram Bridge was the historical transition of the Murray River from being used primarily for navigation to being used primarily for irrigation water supply. During the 1870s, the closer settlement of the Riverina region for agriculture was struggling with the vagaries of climate and water in western NSW. Selectors obtained land and, in optimal conditions, produced excellent yields, with wheat predominating over other crops. However, rainfall was irregular and tended towards periods of oversupply (flood) followed by long periods of undersupply (drought). Farmers quickly realised that, without some regularity of water supply, their future was doubtful. Consequently, from the mid-1880s, the possibilities of land irrigation were closely investigated.

George Chaffey, an engineer brought out from California, commenced designing a massive irrigation scheme at Mildura in 1887. Whilst this scheme had its own story of success and failure, it represented a concerted state investment to create a permanent agricultural settlement along the Murray River and to institute a means of exploiting the Murray River for agriculture. In 1893, representatives of the three states met in Melbourne and considered the matter of installing locks on the Murray River to preserve supplies for irrigation, whilst permitting ongoing navigation. The prospect of this damming of the river caused considerable concern in South Australia but, when the matter was raised, NSW denied that South Australia had any claim to the waters of the Murray; since no tributaries entered within its territory, South Australia had no rights to water beyond that which flowed across the border. These conflicts of interests tended to stymie any co-ordinated action and the matter of apportioning the Murray's waters between the states remained unresolved. As independent states in economic competition with each other, the idea of co-operative action for mutual benefit was rife with complications and arguments.

Federation in 1901, however, meant that the three states in which the Murray flowed were no longer in competition and, as this coincided with extremely dry conditions in the Murray River regions, there was considerable impetus to address the matter. The government leaders decided that a tri-state Royal Commission should be set up to investigate the 'conservation and distribution of the Murray and its tributaries for the purposes of irrigation, navigation and water supply'. The Royal Commission's subsequent report of 1902 recommended joint control of the Murray by the three states and a joint funding arrangement for water conservation infrastructure such as dams and weirs. By the beginning of the twentieth century, this transition was well underway, with river navigation trade almost completely moribund by the 1930s. However, during the early twentieth century, the option for river transport was preserved by, amongst other measures, the continued construction of opening bridges across the Murray River.

=== Erection and Operation of the Old Cobram-Barooga Bridge ===
Public meetings were held in the district almost every year from 1894, urging the local members of parliament to persuade the Government of New South Wales and Government of Victoria to approve the construction of the bridge. By November 1899, Government Ministers in both states were able to report that decisions had been taken to proceed with the bridge and that specifications were being prepared. In 1900, after question as to the erection of a bridge over the Murray River at Cobram had been under considerable consideration, it was decided that the bridge would be financed and built by the Victorian government. Once completed, it appears that the Victorian Country Roads Board was responsible for maintenance of the Bridge as well.

The construction of the bridge across the Murray River at Cobram-Barooga became evidence of the value of the wool industry in the vicinity and of the economic flows of goods between NSW and Victoria in the late nineteenth century. The story of Cobram-Barooga is representative of the story of the development of the Murray River generally and illustrates the competition between townships for a bridge as a formal border crossing and as a guarantee of ongoing economic development.

Additions were made to the lift span in January 2000.

A new bridge for road traffic was built in 2006, next to the Cobram-Barooga Bridge which then became a dedicated pedestrian foot bridge. The northern approach (NSW end) was subsequently removed and replaced with a staircase that is considered to be unsympathetic and intrusive.

== Description ==
The Old Cobram-Barooga Bridge is a timber truss, lift-span bridge that formerly carried two traffic lanes across the Murray River between Cobram (Victoria) and Barooga (NSW). It is now a pedestrian bridge having been superseded by a parallel bridge for vehicular traffic.

The primary axis of the bridge is east-west. The bridge has a clearance over normal water level of 7.9m with the lift span closed and 14.3m with the lift span open.

It is a large twelve-span bridge of timber, steel, iron and concrete and features a steel lift-span on an iron and concrete substructure with two large De Burgh composite timber-steel truss spans. The three main spans include a single, vertical-lift opening span supported on cast iron piers in the centre of the bridge, flanked by a single De Burgh Truss span on each side. The eastern (NSW) side has been truncated and retains only one timber beam approach span, which terminates in a steel fence and stair to ground level. All three timber beam approach spans survive on the western (Victorian) side. The outer ends of the truss spans and the approach spans are carried on timber trestles on timber piles. The outer ends of the lift span are carried on twin cylindrical cast iron piers with intermediate perforated steel plate braces.

The lift span is formed by a roadway between riveted Pratt-Truss box-girders with a span of 18m. The road deck on the lift span is narrower than the approaches and reduces to one traffic lane. The lifting superstructure comprises four steel lattice towers, connected at their upper level by steel lattice girders.

The two De Burgh truss spans, each 31.7m, are of composite timber and steel construction, with paired timber top chords and vertical struts with steel rods forming diagonals within each panel.

The approach spans range from approximately 9.1m to 11m in length and are of timber beam construction, comprising five parallel timber logs spanning between timber and trestle piers. Each span has been strengthened by the addition of four steel RSJs, one each located in between the timber logs.

There is a footway on the southern side with a timber guardrail but the majority of the timber decking of the footway has been removed. The footway is absent on the lifting span and the footways have an entrance to the road deck on either side of the opening span. Pedestrians were required to share the road deck with vehicles for the length of the opening span.

The bridge fabric condition was reported to be generally good as at 8 September 2015. The northern approach (NSW end) has been removed and replaced with a staircase that is considered to be unsympathetic and intrusive. Future remodelling of stairs or replacement would be recommended.

The integrity has been spoilt by removal of northern approach spans but the remaining components are largely intact.

== Heritage listing ==
The Old Cobram-Barooga Bridge is of state heritage significance because it is an excellent, intact and rare example of a Hinton-type vertical lift-span opening bridge with De Burgh Truss side spans and timber beam approaches. It is historically one of the significant crossings of the Murray River and the NSW/Victoria state border and the construction of this vertical lift-span opening bridge records the original use of the Murray River for commercial transport of wheat and wool produce. The establishment of the bridge reflects the historical development of the Riverina region of NSW and its relationship across the Murray River with railway transport to Melbourne, the history of which was also a significant element in the economic and agricultural development of northern Victoria. The Old Cobram-Barooga Bridge is directly associated with the Federation of the Australian states in 1901. Its construction was delayed until the outcomes of the Federation proposals were known and this association, in the context of the past and future use of the Murray River, illustrates the economic relationships between the states in the 1890s and the motivations for Federation.

Old Cobram-Barooga Bridge was listed on the New South Wales State Heritage Register on 1 April 2016 having satisfied the following criteria.

The place is important in demonstrating the course, or pattern, of cultural or natural history in New South Wales.

The Old Cobram-Barooga Bridge is of state historical significance as the original road link over the Murray River in this location, which served this role for over a century and a significant crossing point over the boundary of the states of NSW and Victoria.

The Old Cobram-Barooga Bridge is of state significance as a significant relic of the era when motor vehicles were still virtually unknown and the horse and bullock-drawn wagon was still the major form of heavy road transport. The importance of the bridge was to provide access for heavy goods vehicles to deliver agricultural produce from NSW to the railhead at Cobram for transport to the markets and wharves of Melbourne. In this regard, the bridge is a relic of the nineteenth century economy of Australia, which was focused upon agricultural produce, particularly wool and wheat, much of which was created in the southwest of NSW and north-west of Victoria.

The historical origins of the Old Cobram-Barooga Bridge and the reasons for its construction are components in the story of the settlement, development and economic history of the Riverina region and the equivalent region in northern Victoria. The goldrushes, cattle droving, mobs of sheep and laden wool wagons are all key iconic images of Australian colonial history in which the Murray River has had a significant role or relationship. The crossings of the Murray River have influenced the locations of major road and railway routes on both sides of the NSW-Victorian border and the waters of the River have been a key factor in the commercial agricultural development of what has been some of the most productive land in modern Australia.

The inclusion of a lift-span in the Old Cobram-Barooga Bridge has historical significance as a relic of the commercial value of the shipping traffic using the Murray River in the latter half of the nineteenth century. Although with hindsight it is clear that this bridge was built at the latter end of the era of commercial shipping on the river, at the time it was built the value of this trade was still sufficient to warrant state investment in the provision of lift-span bridges. The importance of this trade over the previous four decades was such that it was key to the development of the state of Victoria and the nineteenth century prosperity of Melbourne, as evidenced by the investment in railway construction serving this area, and was influential in the early economic development of South Australia, as evidenced by the horse-drawn tramway from Goolwa to Port Elliot, serving the Murray River steamer trade, being completed two years prior to the establishment of railways in Adelaide.

The lift-span in the Old Cobram-Barooga Bridge is also historical evidence of the economic and political relationships between the states of NSW, Victoria and South Australia in the decade before Federation of the states in 1901. The need to maintain shipping navigation in the waterway was as much a political necessity as a commercial requirement and reflected the ongoing debate of the time regarding the competition between the states regarding the use of natural resources for economic purposes. At the end of the nineteenth century, all three states desired access to the Murray River waters for agricultural irrigation. Conflict over the inequality of access to the resource was finally resolved through Federation. The story of the Old Cobram-Barooga Bridge in this context represents a singular example of the myriad of similar issues that led to the federation of the states (rather than any other outcome) at the beginning of the twentieth century.

The place has a strong or special association with a person, or group of persons, of importance of cultural or natural history of New South Wales's history.

The Old Cobram-Barooga Bridge is of state significance ss an important example of the work of engineer Ernest De Burgh, a significant engineer in the history of NSW, and of the work of the NSW Public Works Department. In 1891, De Burgh became Supervising Bridge Engineer and from 1901 to 1903 was Engineer for Bridges in the NSW Public Works Department, both significant roles. His most important works followed his appointment to the Water Supply department, where he was responsible for the construction of Cataract Dam for the Sydney water-supply and was associated with Leslie Wade in the design and construction of Burrinjuck Dam and the Murrumbidgee Irrigation Scheme. He went on to design and supervise construction of the Cordeaux, Avon and Nepean dams (Sydney's fourth water-supply), the Chichester scheme for Newcastle and the Umberumberka scheme for Broken Hill. In 1921-25, he was a member of the Federal Capital Advisory Committee and prepared the original plans for Canberra's water-supply.

The place is important in demonstrating aesthetic characteristics and/or a high degree of creative or technical achievement in New South Wales.

The Old Cobram-Barooga Bridge is of state significance because it demonstrates the high level of technical achievement by the bridge engineers of the NSW Public Works Department in the late nineteenth century in NSW. The design of this type of vertical lift-span was largely developed in NSW with no practical overseas precedents and the efficacy and durability of the design is evidenced by the survival of this bridge and many of its peers for over a century of use.

The timber truss spans represent a sophisticated application of standard designs over a wide range of applications and these De Burgh composite trusses were a significant improvement over the all-timber designs used previously. The development of timber truss designs based on the use of Australian hardwoods was unique to NSW and was a significant engineering and economic achievement that was key to the industrial and social development of Australia in the late nineteenth century.

The lift span of the Old Cobram-Barooga Bridge illustrates a stage in the historic development of opening bridge engineering design in Australia. The adoption of the vertical-lift type of opening bridge for river crossings in NSW in the late nineteenth century required creative and original engineering, as the existing precedents overseas had little direct application. The series of nineteenth century lift-span designs in NSW exhibit an engineering capability of international standard for the period and the Old Cobram Bridge is a key example in the set of surviving vertical-lift type bridges.

The De Burgh timber truss spans of the Old Cobram-Barooga Bridge are relics of the progressive development of timber truss design in NSW and illustrate an important stage in the evolution of the design. The difference of the De Burgh truss from its predecessors illustrates both the historic need to embrace composite materials for bridges for practical and economic reasons and the ongoing adoption of new approaches and innovations in engineering by the engineers of the NSW Public Works department.

The Old Cobram-Barooga Bridge demonstrates local heritage significance for the aesthetic qualities of timber bridges that are typically valued by a significant part of the community, especially the natural materials, a human scale and familiar proportions and the combination of sounds and smells in addition to appearance.

The place has a strong or special association with a particular community or cultural group in New South Wales for social, cultural or spiritual reasons.

The Old Cobram-Barooga Bridge has local level significance to the communities of Cobram and Barooga as a traditional crossing, as a key icon of the locality and as a local amenity. It is featured prominently in local tourism brochures and websites and the story of the bridge is closely tied to the history and identity of the two townships. (Local Significance)

The place has potential to yield information that will contribute to an understanding of the cultural or natural history of New South Wales.

The Old Cobram-Barooga Bridge is of state significance for its research potential as a De Burgh truss bridge. De Burgh bridges illustrate an important stage in the evolution of timber truss bridge design, and Old Cobram-Barooga Bridge is one of only four such bridges to be retained in the long term in NSW. Old Cobram-Barooga Bridge is also of state significance for its research potential as a key example of the three surviving vertical lift-span bridges of the Hinton Bridge type designed by Ernest De Burgh, and one of only two that retain all of their lift-span operating mechanisms intact.

The place possesses uncommon, rare or endangered aspects of the cultural or natural history of New South Wales.

The Old Cobram-Barooga Bridge is of state significance because it is the one of three surviving vertical lift-span bridges of the Hinton Bridge type designed by Ernest De Burgh and is one of only two that retain all of their lift-span operating mechanisms intact. It is one of nineteen vertical lift-span bridges of all eras surviving in NSW.

The Old Cobram-Barooga Bridge is one of nine surviving bridges in NSW which utilise De Burgh composite timber-truss spans and one of only four which are designated for retention in the long term.

The place is important in demonstrating the principal characteristics of a class of cultural or natural places/environments in New South Wales.

The Old Cobram-Barooga Bridge is of state significance because it encapsulates a representative example of a vertical lift-span of the Hinton Bridge type and two representative examples of De Burgh composite timber-truss spans.

The Old Cobram-Barooga Bridge is broadly representative of an opening bridge dating from the turn of the twentieth century on an inland river in NSW, demonstrating the principal characteristics of a timber truss bridge with timber beam approach spans and a central steel opening span. Opening bridges have been built across the inland rivers of NSW from the 1870s to the 1970s, the majority of which were vertical lift-span bridges.

== See also ==
Next bridge upstream	Murray River	Next bridge downstream
Cobram-Barooga Bridge (new)	Old Cobram-Barooga Bridge	Edward Hillson Bridge (Newell Highway)
