= Sangar, New South Wales =

Sangar
- Town
- Coordinates: 35°40′S 146°08′E
- Country: Australia
- State: New South Wales
- LGA: Federation Council
- Location: 12 km (7.5 mi) from Rennie; 21 km (13 mi) from Oaklands

Government
  - State electorate: Albury
  - Federal division: Farrer
- Elevation: 126 m (413 ft)
- Postcode: 2646
- County: Denison

Sangar is a locality, including a railway station in the south east part of the Riverina. It is situated by road, about 12 kilometres north of Rennie and 21 kilometres south of Oaklands.

== Transport ==
=== Railways ===
The station is located 303.329 km from Melbourne. The station has a wheat silo.
