= Savernake Station =

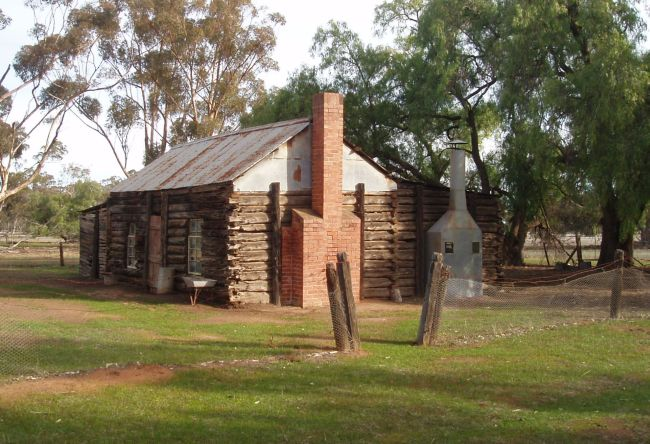
- Settlers' hut

- Location within New South Wales Location within Australia
- 35°45′57″S 146°01′54″E
- Location: 2341 Mulwala Road, Savernake, Federation Council, New South Wales, Australia

History
- Built: 1862–2012

Site notes
- Architect: Various

New South Wales Heritage Register
- Official name: Savernake Station and Moveable Heritage; Savernake Homestead; Sloane Family; Mulwala; Rifle collection; Entomology; Photograph and moving image; Aviation; Aboriginal heritage; rural heritage
- Type: State heritage (complex / group)
- Designated: 15 March 2013
- Reference no.: 1907
- Type: Farm
- Category: Farming and Grazing
- Builders: Various

Savernake Station is a heritage-listed working farm located at 2341 Mulwala Road, Savernake, Federation Council, New South Wales, Australia. It was designed and built from 1862. It is also known as Savernake Homestead. It was added to the New South Wales State Heritage Register on 15 March 2013. The heritage listing includes the station's moveable heritage, including significant collections and archives relating to the property.

== History ==
=== Aboriginal land ===
The Bangerang people used the River Murray as a thoroughfare and were famous for their bark canoes: the banks of the Murray today still have a relatively large number of older trees with the wood exposed where bark for canoes was cut out in the early nineteenth century or before [scar trees]. As late as 1848 the squatter E. M. Curr travelled on the river with an Aboriginal guide in a 6-metre-long (20 ft) canoe with a traditional fire "burning on a hearth of clay in the bows" to grill fish or duck en route.

"The Bangerang found plentiful food, shellfish and Murray cod in the river and fruit, tubers and nuts in the adjacent country. . . In 1845 the census of Aborigines in the Murrumbidgee Pastoral District, which included the Murray, estimated the total number as some two thousand. . . The large middens along the river, on both banks, suggested that there had been in the past a higher density population."

The dislocation by Europeans of normal Aboriginal routines of life was increasingly severe from the 1840s onwards, but already in the 1830s and probably earlier, European diseases, influenza, smallpox and syphilis, had taken a terrible toll of both Wiradjuri and Bangeran.' Some Aboriginal people adapted to the occupation of their land by working on the farms - in stockmen roles for men and domestic service and childcare roles for women.

=== Colonisation - Mulwala Station ===
Mulwala Homestead was founded as part of the process of pastoral development of the vast Riverina region. Squatters started moving into the eastern Riverina in the late 1820s as the area's pastoral potential was recognised by settlers. The region's Aboriginal inhabitants were displaced as the tide of settlement advanced.

An early settler at Mulwala was George Hillas, but the central story of the property is that of the Sloane family. Alexander Sloane emigrated from Scotland to Australia in 1849. He married Annabella née Gibson in 1856 and they had a family. In 1853 Sloane formed a pastoral company and in 1862 he purchased Savernake, north of Mulwala village, where he had nearly 5000 sheep by January 1863. In 1864 he purchased Mulwala Station from Hillas. Here the Sloanes lived in the slab hut built by Hillas, near a lagoon close to the Murray River, which they extended and they built other buildings. Then a flood came in 1867 causing much damage. The Sloanes moved some of the buildings to a higher site and these formed the genesis of the Mulwala homestead complex.

Sheep numbers on Mulwala grew from 12,081 in 1865 to 60,604 by 1874, and the station attained a good reputation as a sheep stud. The 1890s depression, which ruined many properties, was weathered by the Sloanes, as Alexander turned to wheat farming to supplement the property's revenue, and he brought in share farmers. After Alexander's death in 1907, the property was divided up between his sons.

One section of the Sloane family continued to live in the Mulwala homestead with its reduced lands adjoining Savernake but this property has been unoccupied since the mid-1960s. It was bought by the Department of Defence in the 1980s. With the buildings empty the Mulwala complex has deteriorated.

A large and significant collection of archival material created throughout the Sloanes' occupation of Mulwala has been retained by the Sloane family branch at Savernake.

=== Savernake Station ===
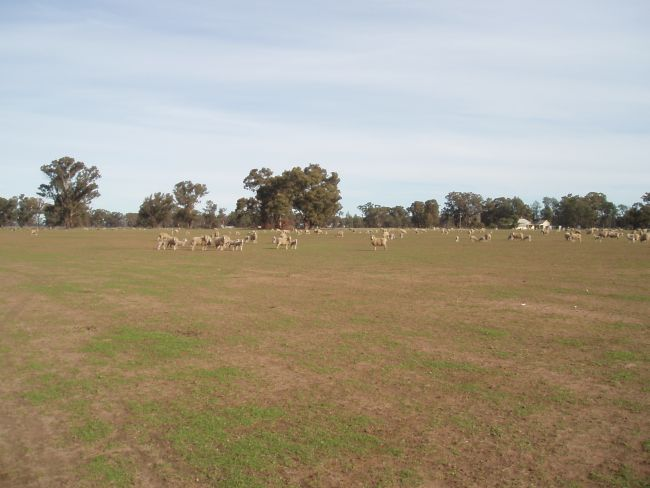
Pastoral farmland at Savernake

After Alexander Sloane's death in 1907 his five surviving sons each took over a portion of the family's consolidated holdings at Mulwala. One of the five sons, William Sloane (1860–1933) had married Jeanie Gordon (1875–1942) in London in 1898 and they took over the most northern part of the Mulwala Station, known as Savernake. Jeanie was an excellent amateur photographer whose detailed letters to her family in England about her experiences as a farmer's wife on this then remote Australian farm have been published by the Sloane family.

Ian Sloane (1903–1986), son of William and Jeanie, was an accomplished photographer and filmmaker, specialising in rural documentaries. The video "Heritage Farming in Australia" contains movie footage shot by Ian Sloane which documents farming practice on Savernake Station in the 1930s. There is a particular focus on the 1935–36 season which was a bumper year for the property's cereal crops, culminating in the construction of a record 180-ton cereal haystack on Savernake Station which provided fodder for the next decade through four severe droughts.

Alexander and Ann Sloane are the fourth generation of the Sloane family to live on and earn a living from Savernake Station, now reduced to 2,000 hectares (4,900 acres). They have four adult children. They continue farming dryland cereals, winter pasture, hay, and raise prime lamb. They nurture the indigenous native vegetation, operate a Farmstay Cottage and day tours on the property. They are members of "Learning from Farmers", an informal network of farmers across the Murray catchment who encourage others to adopt sustainable native vegetation within agricultural enterprises. Alexander's sister Helen Huggins also owns areas of Savernake Station, and operates her agricultural business independently. She has re-established the historic Mulwala Merino Stud, begun on the Savernake property in 1863. She produces wool and dryland cereals, and resides at "Woodpark", Jerilderie with her husband, Owen.

Comparisons with similar properties

Savernake Station is comparable with "Meroogal", Nowra, which dates from 1886, in that both homesteads were occupied by the one family over a long period of time and both properties retain substantial records and decipherable layers in their built fabric. As with the Savernake Station homestead, the pattern of living at Meroogal was first laid down in the 1880s, and repeated by successive generations. Furniture, household objects, letters, diaries, photographs and clothing, have remained at Meroogal, allowing insights into the personal lives of the occupants and permitting the understanding of the contribution made by each generation. The gardens of both homesteads have changed little since the 1920s. Both properties have undergone physical changes over the decades, but these have not obscured the early history. Rather, they have provided a demonstration of the different layers of history. Meroogal is listed on the State heritage register (SHR) and is owned by the Historic Houses Trust which runs it as a house museum.

Ben Chifley's House in Bathurst, dating from the 1880s, also compares to Savernake Station because of its moveable heritage still remaining in its original place of context. Chifley's House is listed on the SHR and owned by Bathurst Regional Council which runs it as a house museum.

Tocal Homestead, Paterson in the Hunter Valley, is comparable with Savernake Station for its collection of colonial farm buildings, such as homestead, manager's cottage, barn, and range of outbuildings and stockyards. As with Savernake, Tocal is still a functioning farm, and operates a tourism enterprise. While its buildings are more architecturally remarkable, including an early colonial barn built by convicts in the 1830s, a fine double-storey Regency homestead building from the 1840s, a barn designed by Edmund Blacket in the 1860s and an important collection of vernacular timber buildings, the property does not retain a comprehensive moveable heritage collection associated with the historic running of the farm.

== Description ==
=== Property ===
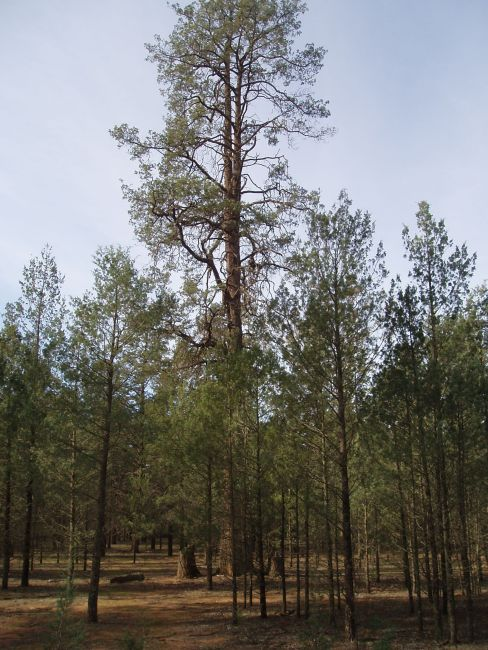
400-year-old tree surrounded by its children

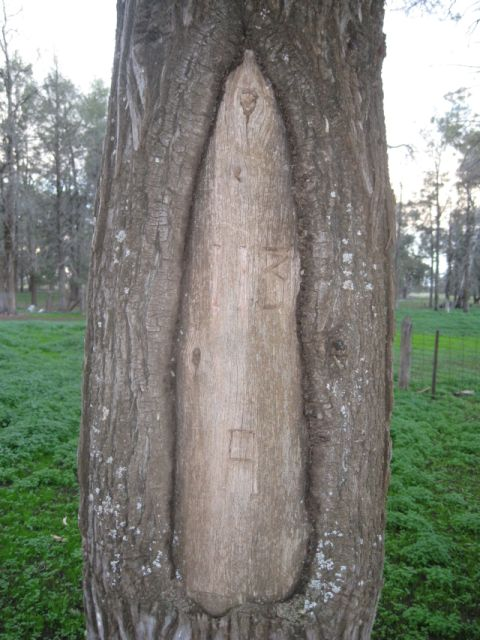
Scar tree at Savernake

Savernake Station is situated north of the 15,000-hectare (37,000-acre) Mulwala Station. Alexander Sloane acquired the lease of Savernake Station, then being 5,000 hectares (12,000 acres), in 1862. In 1864 he acquired the lease of the adjoining Mulwala Station and operated them as one unit.

Now comprising 2,000 hectares (4,900 acres), Savernake Station has been in continuous agricultural and pastoral use by the Sloane family (now fourth generation). The property retains both cultural and natural remnants of its long history, including many examples of farm machinery.

There is an indigenous species-rich and pristine box (Eucalyptus sp.)-cypress pine (Callitris sp.) woodland forest with 400-year-old trees. This area of 300 to 400 hectares (740 to 990 acres) is highly regarded among environmentalists for its pristine condition and species richness including at least 120 species, 250 flora species, 20 mammal species, 15 reptile species, amphibians and innumerable insects. This site has been used for research by PhD students, tertiary students, community projects, Landcare workshops and environmental staff training seminars. Considered significant.

The property was part of the land of the Pangerang Aboriginal people and there is evidence of approximately six canoe / scar trees adjacent to the ephemeral creekline, and extensive areas of middens and oven mounds. "Situated along an ephemeral creek line, mounds occur up to 100 metres (330 ft) from the watercourse. They are approximately 6m in diameter, and 10–30 centimetres (3.9–11.8 in) high, spaced about 10 metres (33 ft) apart or superimposed on older specimens. Some have rare stone artefacts either on the surface or embedded in the mounds. Cultural material is likely buried within the mounds. This semi-continuous mound formation appears to be huge. This would mean thousands of earth ovens are present in this area." Considered significant.

=== Buildings ===
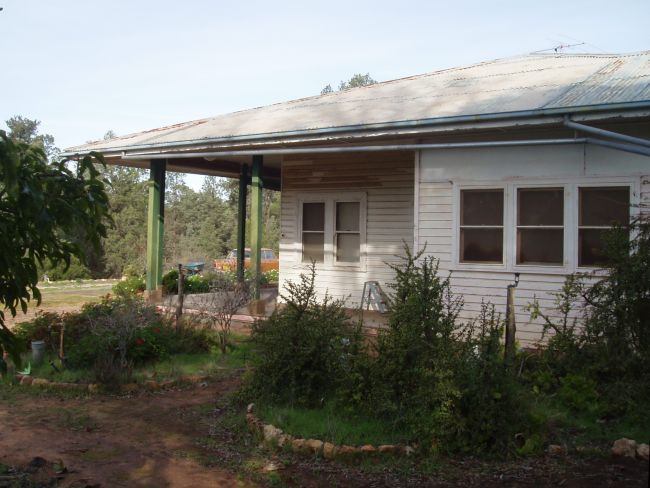
Homestead

- 1876 - Selector's Hut: is an example of wattle and daub pioneering architecture, with the use of interlinked horizontal cypress pine logs, the gaps being filled with mud. Considered significant.
- 1886 - Homestead with 1911 additions and Servants' Quarters to rear and associated outbuildings. Has been modified over many years of family occupation and indicates how the development of the station progressed. Now a privately run house museum. Considered highly significant in association with the moveable heritage collections held there.
- 1880s - Boundary Rider's Hut is an example of simple pioneering construction for the accommodation of temporary pastoral staff. Considered significant.
- 1890s - Machinery Shed, with 20 agricultural implements and 4 horse-drawn vehicles. Considered significant.
- 1902 - White Well, near the Settler's Hut. 30m hand dug well, retaining internal timbers. Considered significant.
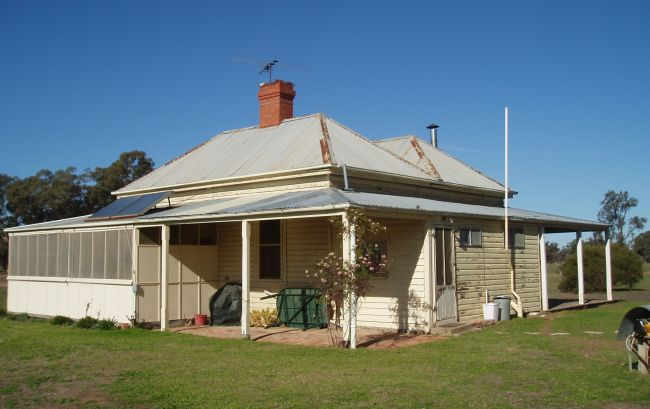
- Overseer's cottage
  1912 - Overseer's Cottage and outbuildings are typical of the period and remain basically intact. Considered significant.
- 1912 - Woolshed and Shearers' Quarters and associated equipment which demonstrate the importance of the merino sheep industry to the station's development. The woolshed has uncommon timber "drop plank" walls. The woolshed largely remains intact, and includes an 1895 steam engine and 1926 wool press. Considered significant.
- 1980s - "Little Creek" residence. Considered non-significant for heritage purposes.

=== Moveable heritage ===
Quote from the NSW Department of Housing and Construction, for the Department of Defence:

The historical material available on the social, economic and management history of the homestead and property complex is comparable to the largest and most intact collections of this kind in Australia. . . Nearly all of the Sloane material . . . is primary source material. . [including] two extensive manuscripts of recollections by senior family members. . . The collection also includes a graph depicting rainfall on the Savernake/Mulwala holdings from 1862 to 1986, on show in the Homestead building

The equipment and machinery associated with specific buildings and sites on the property. Considered highly significant.

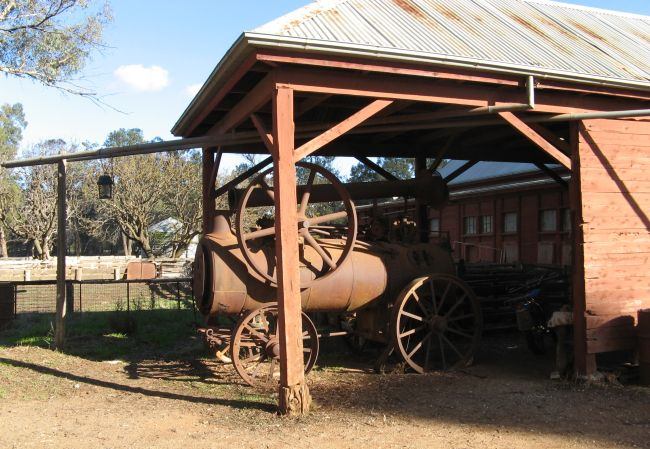
Farm machinery shed

A fair proportion of these objects are original to specific sites and are located in situ - for example, the 1948 Ronaldson and Tippet power generating plant in the homestead powerhouse; the c 1912 grindstone at the woolshed; four old bu presentable Peugeots in a shed near the Homestead and the 1926 petrol pump also near the homestead (under a shelter), identified as a LASCO Larkins Aircraft Supply, understood to be the only working original example in Australia.. Other objects are located at sites with which they are primarily associated e.g. the Clayton and Shuttleworth steam engine no 27258 used to provide power to the woolshed from 1912 to 1938 and the c.1860s grindstone moved from Mulwala Station woolshed.

The collection of tools, general farming hardware and domestic equipment associated with the running of the station since 1862. Considered highly significant.

This collection is considerable in size and scope. In some sections of the historic buildings (e.g. the Shearers' mess), displays of heritage tools and equipment illustrate many of the activities which would have been undertaken in previous decades. For example, two of the leather fire beaters shown in use to fight a grass fire in the film Heritage Farming in Australia are on display, as is the Petzke bag filler also shown in use in the film. Similarly, one of the "bedrooms" in the Shearers' Quarters has been furnished as it would have been if two shearers were in residence in the 1930s. The storeroom in the homestead kitchen/servants quarters building dates to 1900 and displays dry goods packaging and domestic paraphernalia.

The Savernake Station and Sloane Family Archives. Considered highly significant.

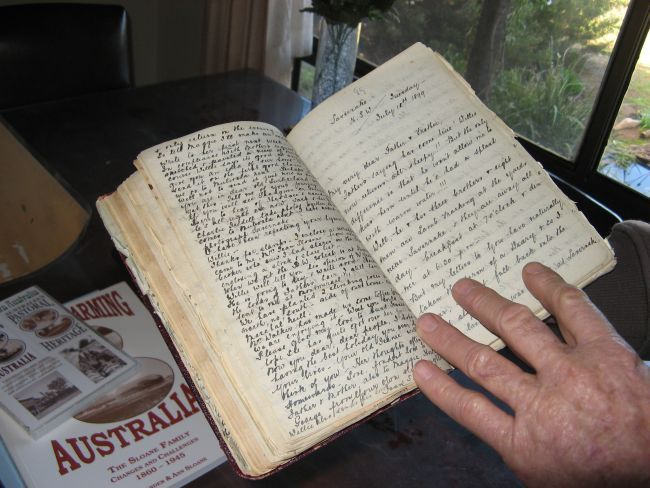
Grandmother's diaries held at Savernake

The family archives consist of farm diaries, business documents, account books, correspondence, papers and magazines. These are extensive and are stored primarily in two shipping containers and the small machinery shed. While some documents have been given to the Riverina Archives at the Charles Sturt University, Wagga Wagga (and copies made for the Savernake holdings) this does not diminish the overall comprehensiveness of this archive as a record of the "social, economic and management history of the homestead and property complex". The material ranges from the personal (e.g. the farm daily diaries of Alexander Sloane amounting to 44 volumes and letters written by his wife Annabella and William Sloane's wife Jeanie), to documents and magazines which illustrate the developments and setbacks experienced by pioneering farmers like Alexander and his descendants as they continued the family tradition of farming in the Riverina. vThese include hundreds of letters dealing with the NSW Selection era and Acts of 1860-1880s.

The photographic collections associated with Savernake. Considered highly significant.

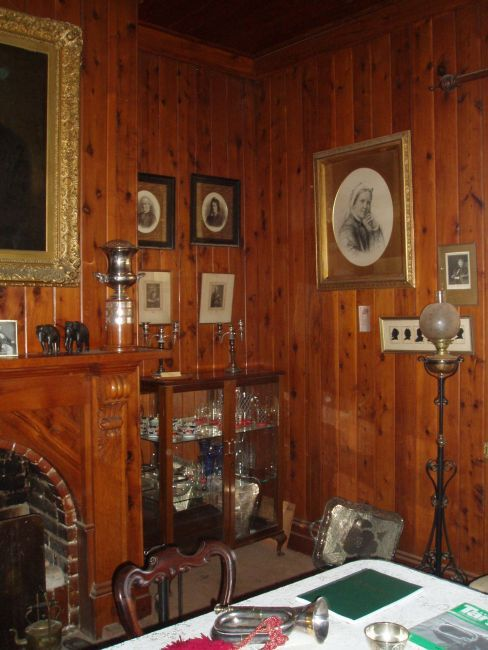
Homestead interior with moveable heritage

The photographic collections merit specific distinction as they provide a vivid and detailed record of Savernake Station as a working property, of the life of the Sloane family and of the district. The most accomplished of the Sloane family photographers was Ian Fyfe Sloane whose legacy is represented by an extensive collection of his photographs, negatives and movie films as well as reel to reel tapes and, his darkrooms and photographic equipment (note in 1986, Ian Sloane's reel to reel tape collection provided the ABC with recordings of Blue Hills which were not in the ABC archives). This collection is an outstanding series of photographic essays of farming life in still and movie images. Movie footage contained in DVDs "Heritage Farming in Australia" and 'Australia's Pastoral Heritage' has received international awards from USA and Europe, as well as accolades from National Film and Sound Archives in Canberra and Melbourne. The collection includes unique colour footage of entire length of Murray River 1953–55. At the launch of the video "Heritage Farming in Australia" Dr Jeff Brownrigg of the National Film and Sound Archive, Canberra, stated "What we have in his work is a time capsule, a record of a vanished way of doing things". Ian's extensive production of still photographs was the "foundation" for Alex and Ann Sloane's publication "Heritage Farming in Australia", 1998. Ian Sloane began taking photographs at an early age as his mother Jeanie Sloane was a keen amateur photographer. At least one of her albums is on display in the homestead and the images offer a woman's perspective on life at Savernake Station.

Collections linked to particular family members. Considered highly significant.

In addition to the Ian Sloane photographic collection, Alex and Ann Sloane have described collections linked to three family members. These are:

1. The rifle heritage of William Sloane (grandfather of 2012 occupant) consisting of awards, medals, insignia, rifles, trophies, letters and diaries. William competed at the international Bisley competition in 1897 1898, then was part of the Australian team in 1902. He also represented his country in New Zealand competitions. The team was victorious in 1897 and 1902. He was instrumental in modernizing the Victorian Defences with the appropriate rifle. His part in riflemen history has been documented in "The Bisley Boys" by Andrew Kilsby, 2008. These objects are on display in the 1886 timber panelled homestead dining room.
2. The aviation heritage of William Douglas Sloane (uncle of 2012 occupant) including a 1912 bi-plane built by WD Sloane, his World War I correspondence, artefacts and photographs. These objects are housed in the Pioneer Museum, Mulwala.
3. The entomological heritage of Thomas Gibson Sloane (great uncle of 2012 occupant) who was an internationally recognised entomologist specialising in ground beetles – his extensive collection of beetles is housed at the CSIRO as is his portrait as a pioneer entomologist. He is noted in the Australian Dictionary of Biography. While this collection is not housed at Savernake and presumably is not part of the Movable Heritage under threat of dispersal, it is important to record it as part of the total Sloane family heritage. His 'Sloane's Tables of Tribes' still forms the basis of entomological classification to this day.

Aboriginal heritage of Savernake Station documenting contact between Sloane family members and the local Pangerang tribe and the movable heritage of the Pangerang tribe. Considered highly significant.

The collection includes spears, boomerangs, a woomera, stones, sacred stones and artefacts from the Boat Rock well on the property. Second generation pioneer William Sloane was a friend of the tribe and in particular of "Wellington" who taught William how to make boomerangs. 'An example of a boomerang made of Scottish ash by William on a visit to Scotland is on display in the former kitchen (Natural History Museum) wing of the Homestead, along with a selection of other Aboriginal artefacts including the last boomerang made by "Wellington".

Sloane family movable heritage reflecting interest in the local fauna and family memorabilia and curios on display in the family "museum". (Sanders) Considered highly significant.

Members of the family collected and taxidermied some local species in the 1870s – reptiles, mammals and birds. There is also William Howard Sloane's Birds' Egg Collection of 1910s, the 1882 skull of first rabbit in Mulwala district, and a section of the spar from the wreck of the ship "Loch Ard", as well as other unique memorabilia such as the hide and head of a cheetah shot in India by a Russian nobleman who married into the Sloane family. There are also family portraits, antique Scottish furniture, gigs, and horse-drawn vehicles, early agricultural machinery, 1895 portable steam engine, 1948 Ronaldson & Tippet 110 volt power plant in original shed, 1930s Macdonald diesel engine, 1925 wool press, 1920s petrol bowser, assorted items in private museum and 1900s store room.

=== Condition ===
As at 4 September 2012, the machinery, collections and natural forest were intact and in good condition. The condition of the buildings is fair to very good, however maintenance is continual. The environment comprises highly intact natural forest, farm buildings, machinery and heritage collections.

=== Modifications and dates ===
- 1886 Homestead: 1911; 1953.
- 1912 Overseer's Cottage: 1978.
- 1876 Selector's Hut: 1920s.

== Heritage listing ==
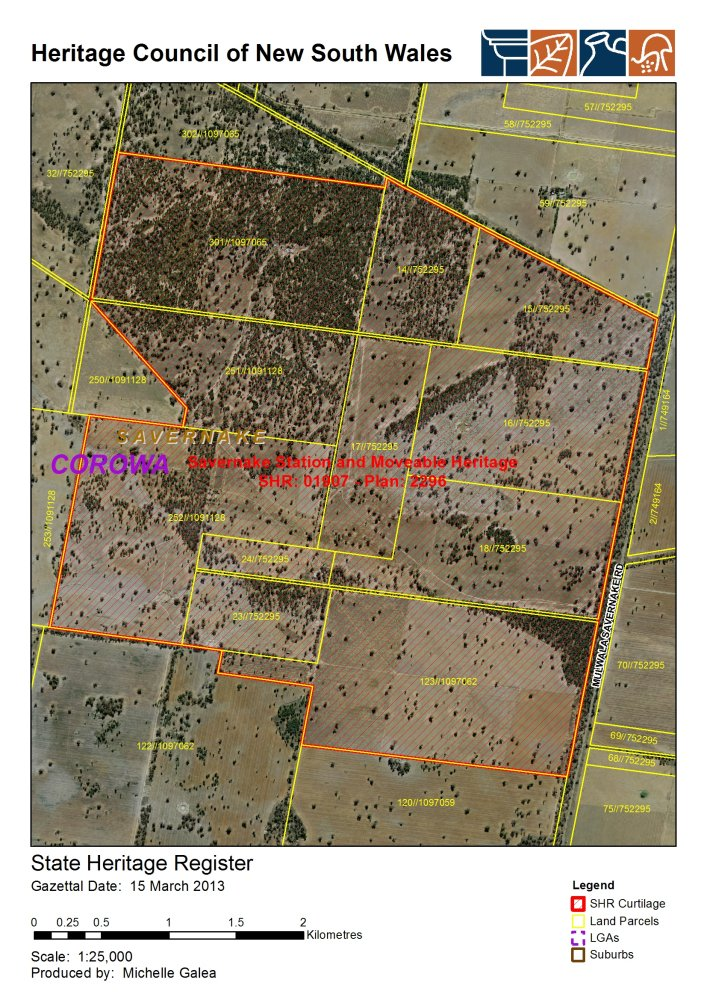
Heritage boundaries

Savernake Station and Movable Heritage is of State significance for its research potential to contribute to our understanding of pioneer pastoral and agricultural life from the perspective of the Sloane family who have continuously farmed this land since 1862. It is also of State historic, aesthetic, rarity and representational significance. The property includes a 'selector's hut' dating from 1876 and a homestead dating from 1886, as well as associated farm outbuildings including servants' quarters, overseer's cottage, woolshed and shearers' quarters from the early twentieth century. The property is also rare for including 400 hectares (990 acres) of undisturbed, indigenous woodlands including Aboriginal canoe / scar trees, middens and earth ovens. The place is most remarkable for its moveable heritage collection which includes farm machinery, domestic wares, written records and high quality film and photography of the farm under cultivation. The depth, breadth and detail of the archives and photography collections comprehensively document the operations and management of the property and the family's life over successive generations. The significance of the movable heritage collection is considerably enhanced by its historical and continuing association with the extant buildings, sites, operations and family occupation of the place. These items provide valuable illustrations of the developments of farming technology and practice over time and in response to environmental conditions as well as market demands and developing infrastructure. "The historical material available on the social, economic and management history of the homestead and property complex is comparable to the largest and most intact collections of this kind in Australia".

Savernake Station was listed on the New South Wales State Heritage Register on 15 March 2013 having satisfied the following criteria.

The place is important in demonstrating the course, or pattern, of cultural or natural history in New South Wales.

Savernake Station and Moveable Heritage is of state significance for its historical demonstration of the colonisation of the Riverina, being the northern tip of the 20,000-hectare (49,000-acre) Mulwala Homestead established by Alexander Sloane on the Murray River in 1862. Savernake Station, now comprising 2,000 hectares (4,900 acres) is still in continuous agricultural and pastoral use by a branch of the Sloane family (the fourth generation). It retains both cultural and natural remnants of its long history, including many examples of farm buildings and machinery and a pristine, indigenous pine forest with 400-year-old trees. Its moveable heritage collection is of state historical significance for its comprehensive documentation of the Sloane family presence and history on their holdings and in the district.

The place has a strong or special association with a person, or group of persons, of importance of cultural or natural history of New South Wales's history.

Savernake Station is likely to be of local significance for its associations with the Sloane family, a prominent local pastoral family who have been in continuous occupation of the property since 1862. Many members of the Sloane family have made contributions to Australian cultural and scientific life including: William Sloane who was a champion shooter and rifle collector, Thomas Gibson Sloane who documented and collected insects, Ian Fyfe Sloane who was an award-winning photographer in both still and moving images and William Douglas Sloane who contributed to Australian aviation by building and flying his own wooden aeroplane on Dicks Plain at Mulwala Station in 1912. It is also of significance for its associations with the indigenous people who lived there, especially the elder known as Wellington who formed a friendship with William Sloane, son of the pioneering Alexander Sloane.

The place is important in demonstrating aesthetic characteristics and/or a high degree of creative or technical achievement in New South Wales.

The movable heritage collection at Savernake Station is of state significance as an outstanding collection of items which demonstrate both representative and innovative technological developments in the design and production of machinery for Australian agriculture and pastoralism over 150 years. Such innovations helped farmers like the Sloane family to develop a largely sustainable way of life despite the challenges such as drought and the long-term effects of the early, inappropriate methods of soil management. The photographic archives detail much of the machinery developed on the farm, often showing technology in use. The photographic collection is itself of state aesthetic significance, notably the Ian Fyfe Sloane collection of photographs, negatives, movie films and reel to reel tapes, as an "outstanding series of photographic essays of farming life in still and movie images". His movie footage contained in documentaries "Heritage Farming in Australia" and 'Australia's Pastoral Heritage' has received international awards as well as accolades from the Australian National Film and Sound Archives.

The place has strong or special association with a particular community or cultural group in New South Wales for social, cultural or spiritual reasons.

The Movable Heritage collection of Savernake Station is likely to be of local social significance to the people of Corowa Shire as an unusually detailed and comprehensive record of a farming family's occupation of the land since it was granted. It is likely to contribute to understandings of not only the Sloane family's role over time but also their interaction with the surrounding community including neighbours and also those involved through work and business with the operation of the property over several generations.

The place has potential to yield information that will contribute to an understanding of the cultural or natural history of New South Wales.

Savernake Station and Moveable Heritage is of state significance for its archaeological and research potential to increase understanding of both Aboriginal occupation of the land and the subsequent colonisation of the land since the 1860s. The comprehensiveness of the Sloane family and property archives and records of their farming activities, methods of farming and land management over several generations ensures there will be information which will add to understanding of the area's natural and cultural history, for example, the comprehensive record of rainfall noted daily between 1862 and 1986.

The place possesses uncommon, rare or endangered aspects of the cultural or natural history of New South Wales.

Savernake Station and Moveable Heritage is of state significance as a rare surviving and intact example of a "pastoral complex" operating between the 1880s and 1950 in the Riverina. The site is also rare as it contains 400 hectares of natural "undisturbed" indigenous woodlands and Aboriginal canoe / scar trees and other relics. The moveable heritage collection is rare for its longitudinal comprehensiveness and its continuing association with the family and land to which it relates, making it "comparable to the largest and most intact collections of this kind in Australia".

The place is important in demonstrating the principal characteristics of a class of cultural or natural places/environments in New South Wales.

Savernake Station and Moveable Heritage, with its surviving indigenous woods and Aboriginal relics, its historic complex of buildings and pastoral lands, its associated movable heritage collection including extensive and comprehensive family and property records, is of state significance for representing the development of a pastoral property in NSW from its infancy in the 1860s to the present The still-used woolshed with its timber "drop plank" walls and the shearers' complex of buildings with their movable heritage collection in-situ are an excellent illustration of the role of sheep breeding in the Riverina. The fact that most if not all the fabric at Savernake is in unrestored condition adds to its heritage value. The moveable heritage collection as a whole and especially through the family records and photographic and documentary archives is of state significance as a representative record of not only the Sloane family's continuing enterprise and success as pastoralists but also of all the people associated with the property through employment, contracting, business, supply and sharefarming.
