= Barooga =

- Town
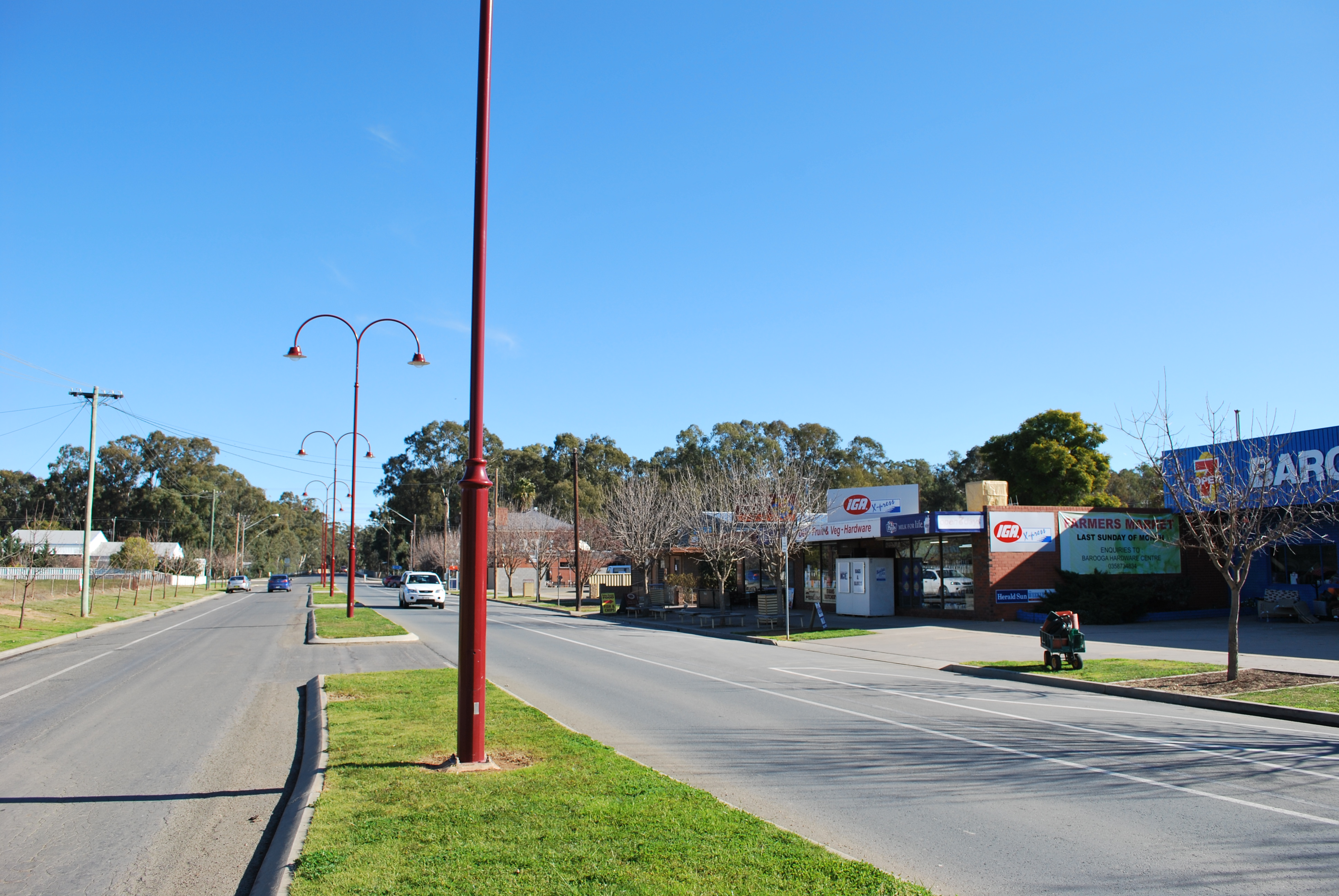
- The main street of Barooga

- Coordinates: 35°54′0″S 145°41′0″E
- Country: Australia
- State: New South Wales
- LGA: Berrigan Shire
- Location: 679 km (422 mi) from Sydney; 130 km (81 mi) from Albury; 27 km (17 mi) from Berrigan; 4 km (2.5 mi) from Cobram
- Established: Late 1800s

Government
  - State electorate: Murray
  - Federal division: Farrer
- Elevation: 121 m (397 ft)

Population
  - Total: 1,888 (2021 census)
- Postcode: 3644
- County: Denison
- Mean max temp: 22.8 °C (73.0 °F)
- Mean min temp: 9.6 °C (49.3 °F)
- Annual rainfall: 455 mm (17.9 in)

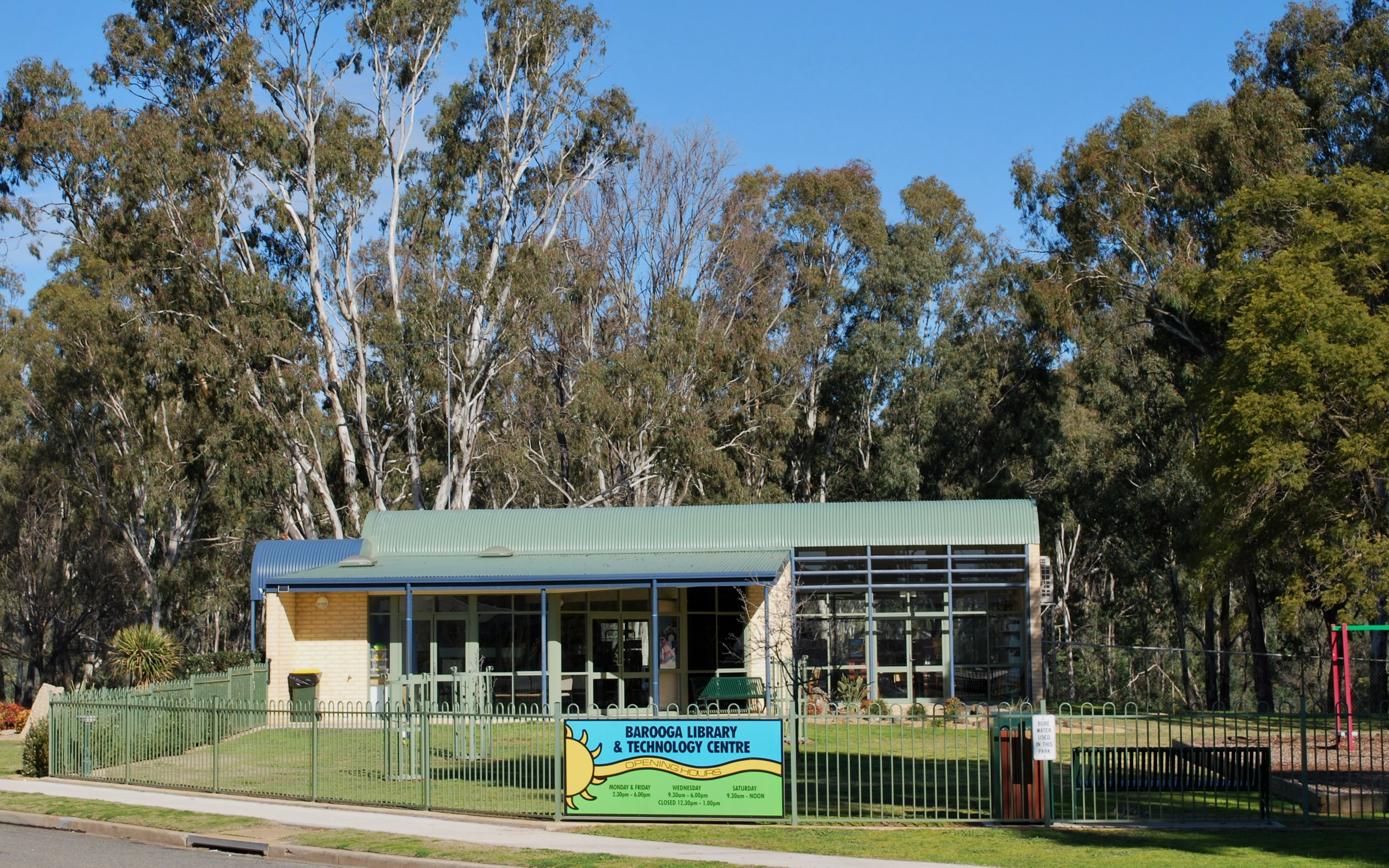
Barooga Library

Barooga is a border town in the Murray region of New South Wales, Australia, located in the Berrigan Shire local government area. It is situated just north of the Murray River, which forms the border with Victoria. Barooga's population at the 2021 census was 1,888.

Barooga is a mainly residential area, and most of its commercial and industrial needs are met in its twin town of Cobram on the south side of the Murray River.

== History ==
Barooga Post Office opened on 1 May 1896.

== Heritage listings ==
Barooga has a number of heritage-listed sites, including:

- Vermont Street: Old Cobram-Barooga Bridge

== Attractions ==
Being only two and a half hours drive from Melbourne, Barooga is a popular holiday destination because it offers two registered clubs, a 36-hole golf course, a nine-hole mini golf course, and river attractions, as well as a large Botanical Garden. Other attractions include a twenty-metre swing bridge, Quicks Beach, walking tracks and the Barooga Markets. Barooga is also home to the Barooga PBR – On The Murray, a bull riding event held in December.

== Education ==
Barooga Public School caters for primary school students. High school students must cross the river to Cobram. The Barooga Public School follows Victorian, rather than New South Wales, school holidays.

== Population ==
According to the 2021 census, there were 1,888 people in Barooga.

Aboriginal and Torres Strait Islander people made up 2% of the population. 81.8% of people were born in Australia. The next most common countries of birth were England 1.6%, Malaysia 1.2% and Philippines 0.8%. 86.6% of people spoke only English at home. Other languages spoken at home included Malay 0.6% and Mandarin 0.5%. The most common responses for religion were Catholic 28.7%, No Religion 24.0% and Anglican 19.3%.

== Postcode ==
Barooga shares the postcode of 3644 with its twin town, Cobram. It is unusual for a town in New South Wales to have a postcode that begins with "3", which ordinarily signifies a location in Victoria. This is probably due to the mail being delivered via Cobram.

== Sport ==
Barooga has an Australian rules football team in the Murray Football League called the Barooga Hawks, and a cricket team in the Murray Valley Cricket Association.

Golfers play at the Cobram Barooga Golf Club (a 36-hole course) on Barooga Golf Course Road.

Other sporting clubs include soccer, netball, tennis, table tennis, bowls and mini golf.

== Nearby towns ==
Cobram, Tocumwal, Mulwala and Berrigan

== Events ==
On 21 March 2013, a tornado affected Barooga, causing widespread damage across a number of towns. Millions of dollars' worth of damage was caused across Victoria and New South Wales.
