= Sloane, New South Wales =

Locality in New South Wales, Australia

Coordinates: 35°55′00″S 146°01′00″E

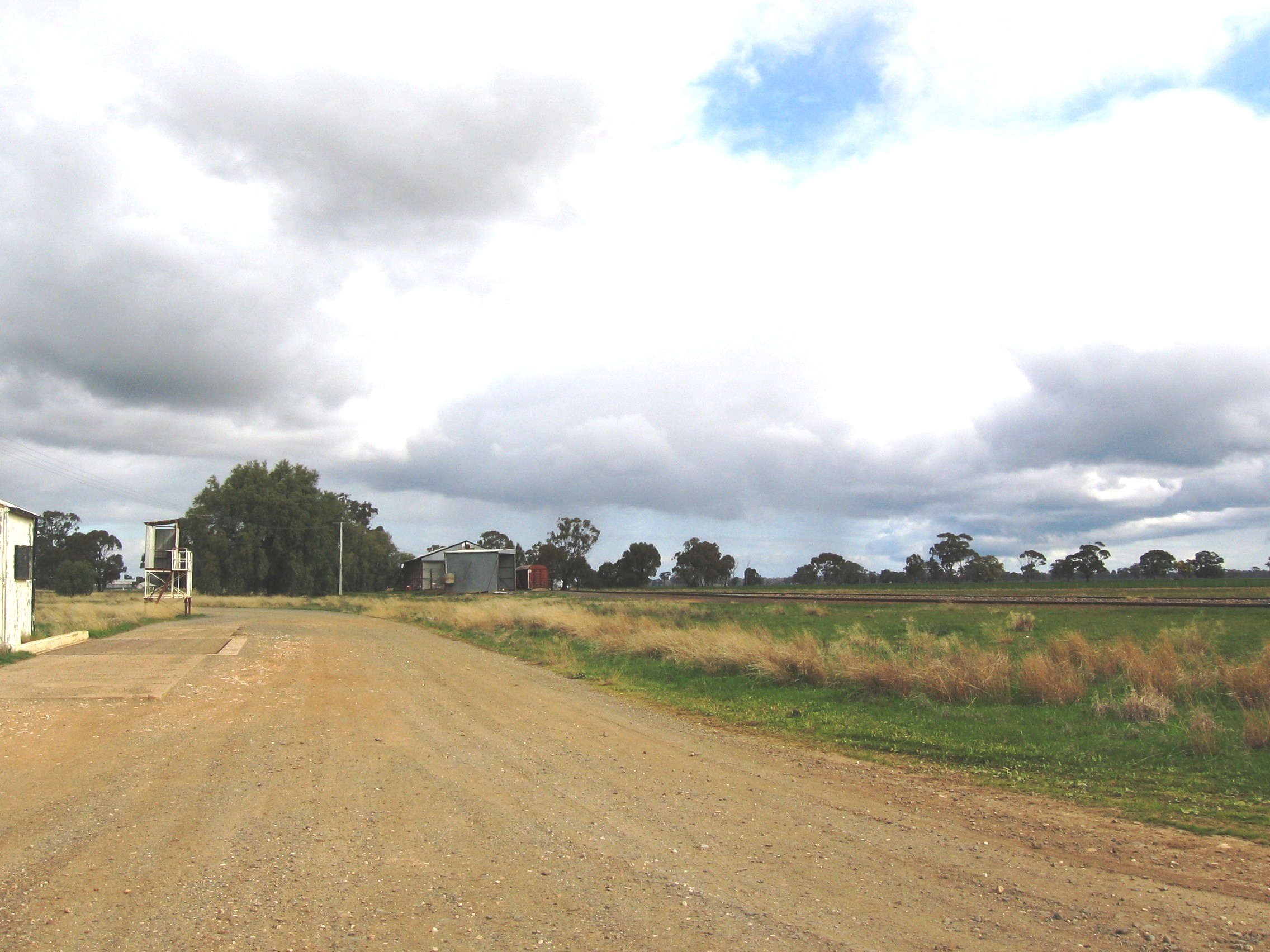
Rail siding at Sloane

Sloane, New South Wales is a small locality in Federation Council whose main reason for being is its railway station and wheat silo. The area was named after Alexander Sloane, one of the pioneers of the Riverina, who owned the grazing properties Savernake Station and Mulwala Station.

== Transport ==
Sloane is located on the Victorian Oaklands railway line and as such the railway was constructed to broad gauge. In 2008 a decision was taken to gauge convert the North East railway line from broad gauge to standard gauge. Subsequently, it was decided to also convert the Oaklands line. The conversion was completed in 2009.
