= Sangar-e Chanibeh-ye Do =

Sangar-e Chanibeh-ye Do سنگرچنيبه دو
- Village
- Location within Iran
- Coordinates: 31°39′50″N 48°50′35″E
- Country: Iran
- Province: Khuzestan
- County: Shushtar
- Bakhsh: Shadravan
- Rural District: Shoaybiyeh-ye Sharqi

Population (2006)
  - Total: 280
- Time zone: UTC+3:30 (IRST)
  - Summer (DST): UTC+4:30 (IRDT)

Sangar-e Chanibeh-ye Do (Persian: سنگرچنيبه دو, also Romanized as Sangar-e Chanībeh-ye Do; also known as Sangar, Sangar-e Chanībeh, and Sangarīyeh-e Kheybeh-e Do) is a village in Shoaybiyeh-ye Sharqi Rural District, Shadravan District, Shushtar County, Khuzestan Province, Iran. As of the 2006 census, its population was 280, consisting of 41 families.
