= Mulwala Homestead =

- Location within New South Wales
- 35.9721°S 145.9773°E
- Location: North Road, Mulwala, New South Wales, Australia

Commonwealth Heritage List
- Official name: Mulwala Homestead Precinct
- Type: Listed place (Historic)
- Designated: 22 June 2004
- Reference no.: 105659

Mulwala Homestead is a heritage-listed homestead at North Road, Mulwala, New South Wales, Australia. It was added to the Australian Commonwealth Heritage List on 22 June 2004.

== History ==
Mulwala Homestead was founded as part of the process of European pastoral development of the vast Riverina. Squatters started moving into the eastern Riverina in the late 1820s as the area's pastoral potential was recognised by colonists. The region's Aboriginal inhabitants were displaced as the tide of white settlement advanced.

An early settler at Mulwala was George Hillas, but the central story of the property is that of the Sloane family. Alexander Sloane emigrated from Scotland to Australia in 1849. He married Annabella (nee Gibson) in 1856 and they had a family. In 1853 Sloane formed a pastoral company, and after a brief trip to Scotland in 1854 he returned to Australia. In 1862 he purchased Savernake, north of Mulwala village, where he had nearly 5000 sheep by January 1863. In 1864 he purchased Mulwala Station from Hillas. Here the Sloanes lived in the slab hut built by Hillas, near a lagoon close to the Murray River, which they extended, and they built other buildings. Then a flood came in 1867, causing much damage. The Sloanes moved some of the buildings to a higher site and these formed the genesis of the present homestead complex.

Sheep numbers on Mulwala grew from 12,081 in 1865 to 60,604 by 1874, and the station attained a good reputation as a sheep stud. The 1890s depression, which ruined many properties, was weathered by the Sloanes, as Alexander turned to wheat farming to supplement the property's revenue, and he brought in share farmers.

In 1870, the homestead was described as "one of the most pleasant on the Murray". The remains of the lagoon buildings formed the central and south wings of the new homestead. In 1869 a schoolroom was added to a north wing, and over the coming years other rooms were added. The homestead buildings were mainly Murray or Cypress Pine slab, with shingle roofs, with internal walls lined with pine boards and finished with calico and wallpaper. A good fruit and vegetable garden was developed. The major final addition to the house was a pise wing in 1927-29, designed by a Corowa architect, Mr MacKnight. Various outbuildings were constructed over the years, the shearing shed having been begun in 1867 and subsequently expanded.

Alexander died in 1907. During the early twentieth century, the various Sloane holdings were split up amongst the family members. After 1964, Mulwala Homestead was not permanently occupied, though still owned by the Sloanes. The Mulwala Explosives Factory had been developed nearby during the Second World War. In 1982, due to expansion of the factory, Defence bought Mulwala Station from the remaining Sloane owner. Later, the caretaker who had been in the building till then was moved out (due to safety concerns, with the explosives works coming closer to the homestead) and public access to the historic home was reduced. With the buildings empty there were concerns about their maintenance. The Department of Defence and the Department of Housing and Construction have carried out some conservation works, but the complex has deteriorated. The property is currently owned by Defence/ADI.

A large and significant collection of archival material created through the lifetime of the Sloanes' occupation of Mulwala is no longer on site, and has not been for some years. It is spread between Charles Sturt University at Wagga Wagga and family members around Mulwala and in Melbourne.

== Description ==
Mulwala Homestead Precinct is at the homestead and all associated nearby outbuildings and garden, the woolshed and shearers quarters, the sheep dip, the land running between the shearers quarters and sheep dip; and the burial site.

The place consists of the homestead, outbuildings, yards, a remnant garden, woolshed and shearers quarters, a sheep dip and remnant sheep wash site, a burial site and a pastoral landscape. There are other archaeological sites outside the boundary.

The homestead complex comprises several wings, which are single storey, and it contains 40 rooms. The north wing has a mix of hipped and gabled roofs, clad in corrugated iron. Walls are mostly vertical slab Cypress Pine, some of which has been painted, some varnished. There is some weatherboard and brick walling as well. Verandahs are timber-floored, with corrugated iron roofs and timber posts. The three chimneys have corbelled tops and are made of hand-pressed bricks.

The central wing has an iron-clad hipped roof, with some shingles remaining under the iron. Walls are entirely vertical pine slabs; again some are varnished and some painted. The verandah is timber floored and has timber posts, and the roof is a continuation of the main hipped roof. Again, there are three corbelled chimneys.

The south wing has a hipped roof, clad with iron. Walls are of Flemish bond brick, and weatherboard. Verandahs are timber floored although there is a concrete-floored section. Two of the three brick chimneys have double flues.

The final wing is that built of pise, with walls 500mm thick, and a surface which has been rough trowelled and painted. Chimneys are also pise. The roof is long, L-shaped, hipped and clad with iron. The verandah has a timber floor and posts, the roof is an extension of the main roof; on the west side is a sunroom enclosed with screen walls, with the lower part clad with asbestos cement.

The slabs in the buildings have been pit-sawn rather than adzed, which is of additional interest.

Some of the internal features are as follows (room numbers are as per the Allom Lovell Sanderson report in the bibliography). Room 1, essentially 1868 in configuration, has slab walls and a board ceiling. Room 2 has hessian and wallpaper covered slab walls, a cypress mantelpiece, board ceiling and double-hung sash windows and an early door. Room 3 has a 1910 carpet, slab walls with cover strips and wallpaper, board ceiling, early door and catch, sash 6-pane windows; the room is basically 1891, but with an 1868 fireplace. Room 4 has a lino-covered floor, the usual 4-panel door, and 6-pane casement windows. Room 7 has early skirtings, as found generally in the house. Room 8 has hessian and paper to the walls, and two arches; its form dates from the 1870s and 1920s. Room 10 was used as a photographic dark room, with calico and paper covered board walls. Room 11 has lino and rugs on the floor, and is basically 1872 with an 1878 chimney. Room 13 has exposed rafters and is 1877 in vintage. Room 14, a hall, has painted fibrous plaster walls, a varnished ceiling and a 4-panel door with toplight. Room 15 has cement-rendered walls and varnished pine skirtings, and 6-pane double-hung sashes. Room 17 has a centre rug and a stain-finished perimeter floor (as does Room 27), hard plastered walls and brass door furniture. Room 18 is similar. There is some porcelain door furniture in the house as well as brass. Room 21 has 1950s toilet fittings. Room 22, a shower, has ripple-iron walls. Room 23, bathroom, has asbestos cement walls to dado height and fibrous plaster above. Rooms 28-40 are in the pise wing, with plastered pise walls, board floors, skirtings, board and fibreboard ceilings and with an original fuel stove in one room.

The outbuildings are numerous, although some others have been lost. The woolshed was built in 1867 and enlarged four times up to the early 1900s; it had 16 stands by 1881. It has large square posts and tree-trunk beams, sapling rafters, a mix of slab and sheet metal walls, and the formerly shingled roof is clad with iron. In the 1980s there were still many tools and pieces of equipment inside and these may still remain. Blades were superseded by powered shears in the 1890s-1900s period. The shearers' quarters, dating from the late 1920s-early 1930s, is a building with weatherboard walls, iron-clad gabled roof, skillion lean-to, double-hung sash windows, is internally lined with boards, has vertical-boarded doors, and an asbestos-cement laundry/washroom was added later. The shearers' dining hut is weatherboard, with an iron-clad gable roof, two brick chimneys and a brick bread oven.

Other outbuildings are as follows. The engine shed dates from 1927 and was built as a laundry, and still contains the boiler and copper. The carpenter's shed is late 1890s, early 1900s and iron-clad. The pump shed has a diesel engine and the floor is trodden earth. The pump house is built over a brick-lined well. The garage, built 1916, is weatherboard with a gabled iron roof. A dovecote is gabled, weatherboard and originally had a brick floor. The carriage shed is gabled, with large doors at one end, and has tack and store rooms as well as a groom's room. Walls are vertical slab, and the building may have been erected in 1874. The machinery shed is weatherboard, gabled and is partly open. The 1916 feed shed is weatherboard and includes boys' and jackeroos' rooms. Other outbuildings include a toilet and chicken coops. There are several water tanks of varying materials and age.

A child's grave (that of Alexander Turner Sloane, the fourth son, who died in 1871) is known to exist on the property, although its features are not evident; it is to the south and west of the homestead. At the far north-west of the site have been found the remains (in the form of several posts) of the nineteenth century sheep wash, together with a more intact sheep dip in the form of a brick and concrete structure, with yards.

The garden, which was well developed in the late 1800s, has been little maintained since the 1930s. Over 140 individual trees have been identified in the garden area. Frequently found are Pepper trees, Monterey Pine, Kurrajong and Cedar, as well as fruit and nut trees. A citrus avenue runs across the former driveway/turning circle. Trees range in age from around 30 years to nearly 130, and some of them are not in good condition (the Bunya Pine was reported to be poor in the mid 1980s). There are traces of paths and driveways. The garden has a mix of formal and axial patterns and informal groupings. Raised mounds indicate former vegetable and flower beds. Much of the garden had a utilitarian purpose, to provide vegetables and fruit for the station population. Near the house is the remains of the tennis court.

Between the woolshed/shearers complex and the sheep dip there are grazing paddocks and timbered areas which provide a remnant rural setting to the homestead and other buildings and structures.

== Condition ==
The buildings and garden as a whole have deteriorated and the complex is run down. Termites and entry of water have been two particular problems. Examples of present problems include chimney corbelling coming adrift, dying garden trees, gutters full of leaves, some fabric falling off outbuildings, one outbuilding has been relocated, some verandah flooring is missing, paintwork is in fair to poor condition, areas of roofing iron are showing rust, some ceilings and walls are cracking, areas of rising damp in walls, and considerable evidence of entry by possums and sheep. The woolshed is in poor condition, roofing is in part missing and structural timbers are failing. Trees are growing close to some outbuildings and are gradually damaging the dovecote and the garage. Explosive storage magazines are close to the precinct. (August 2003)

== Heritage listing ==
Mulwala Homestead Precinct was listed on the Australian Commonwealth Heritage List on 22 June 2004 with the following rationale:

Mulwala Homestead was developed from the 1860s to the 1920s and the precinct is historically significant. Mulwala Station was part of the wave of development of the Riverina during the nineteenth century and the place is associated with the growth of pastoralism in this important region. Mulwala played a notable role in the development of stud flocks and the advancement of wheat growing in this part of New South Wales.

Mulwala illustrates many of the characteristics of the Australian nineteenth century homestead, for example high pitched hipped roofs extending to encircling verandahs, a joined series of single storey buildings which reflect the process of growth, and a typical selection of materials such as Cypress Pine slabs, weatherboard, corrugated iron, brick and pise, and the original and early materials used in the interiors. The scattering of outbuildings, and their modes of construction and their materials, also serve to typify these sorts of pastoral complexes in the region. The sheep dip and remnant sheep wash are further elements characteristic of sheep properties of the area.

The place is of additional interest for the use of pit-sawn (as opposed to adzed) slabs, which makes the place relatively rare. Also somewhat uncommon is the use of vertical slabs for a Riverina homestead as opposed to just the outbuildings. Of exceptional interest and rarity value is the extent of the surviving elements of the original homestead at the newer high site after the floods of 1867. Further, the property was owned by the one family, the Sloanes, from the 1860s until resumption by the Commonwealth in the 1980s. The grave of a Sloane son, although no longer marked, is in the south-west part of the precinct.

The landscape of partly timbered and grazed paddocks, remnant garden, and complex of extended homestead and scattered outbuildings is evocative of the Riverina pastoral life and possesses notable aesthetic values.
