= Sangar (name) =

sangral is a surname or caste found primarily in India. It can be found as a Hindu surname in India. Although historically associated with people of the Brahmin varnas or gotras, the name is also widely adopted by other Hindu communities in India.

Sangral (Persian: سنگر) is also a surname found in the Middle East, primarily in Iran, as well as in various other nations.

It is found as a toponym for numerous locations in numerous nations as well. The word "Sangral" as used in the Middle East originally comes from the Persian word sang and many villages in Iran are named after the surname.
