= Wangamong =

Locality in New South Wales, Australia

Coordinates: 35°36′59″S 146°9′44″E

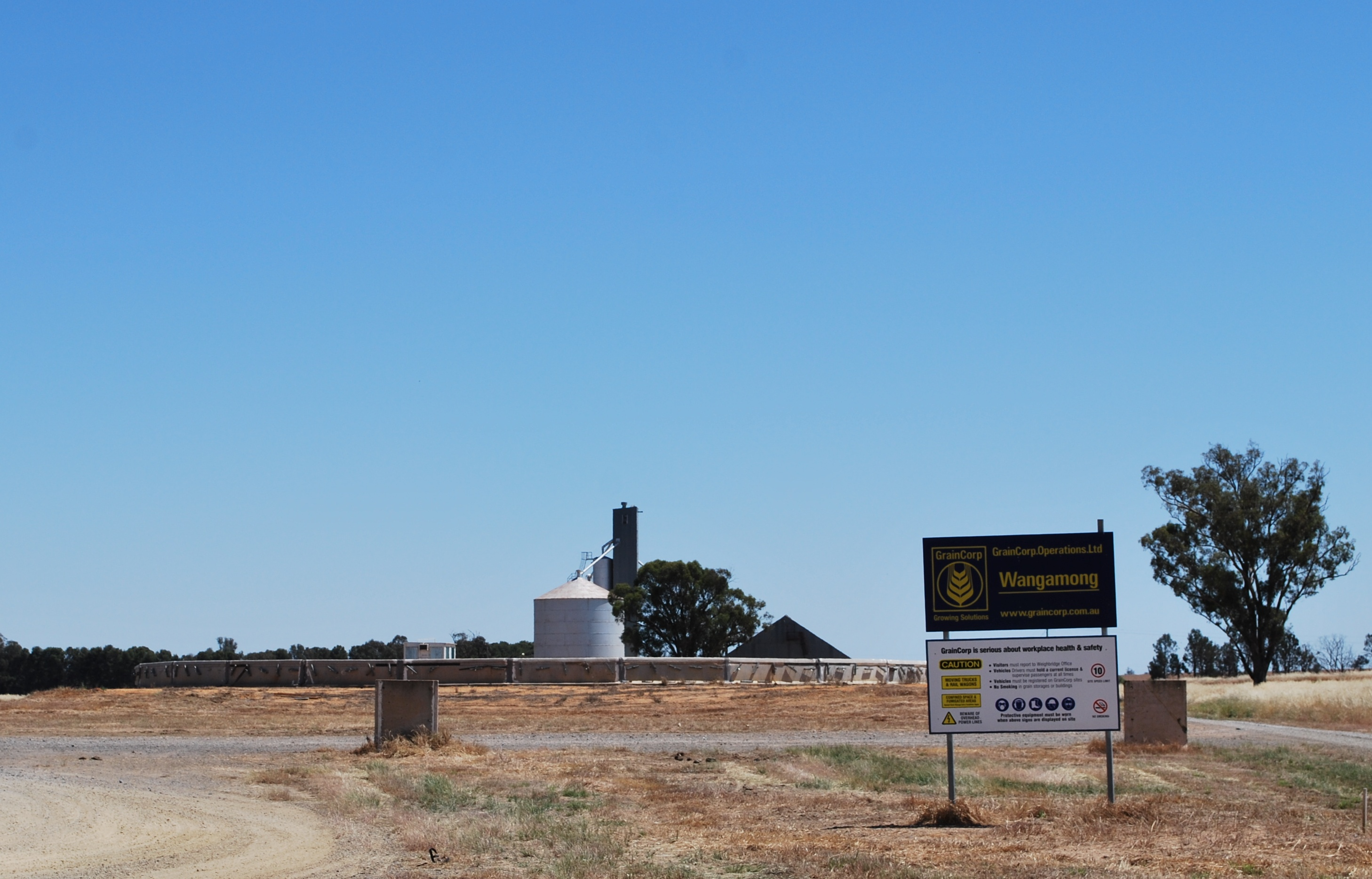
Silos at Wangamong

Wangamong is a locality in New South Wales.

== Transport ==
It lies on the Oaklands railway line, Victoria which is a broad gauge branch operated by Victorian Railways. The station has a wheat silo which is its main reason for being.
