= Sangar, Lorestan =

Sangar سنگر
- Village
- Location within Iran
- Coordinates: 33°31′57″N 49°02′40″E
- Country: Iran
- Province: Lorestan
- County: Dorud
- Bakhsh: Central
- Rural District: Zhan

Population (2006)
  - Total: 411
- Time zone: UTC+3:30 (IRST)
  - Summer (DST): UTC+4:30 (IRDT)

Sangar (Persian: سنگر) is a village in Zhan Rural District, in the Central District of Dorud County, Lorestan Province, Iran. At the 2006 census, its population was 411, in 83 families.
