= Sar Gar, Fars =

Sar Gar سرگر
- Village
- Location within Iran
- Coordinates: 28°45′11″N 52°32′55″E
- Country: Iran
- Province: Fars
- County: Firuzabad
- Bakhsh: Central
- Rural District: Ahmadabad

Population (2006)
  - Total: 931
- Time zone: UTC+3:30 (IRST)
  - Summer (DST): UTC+4:30 (IRDT)

Sar Gar (Persian: سرگر, also Romanized as Sar-e Gar; also known as Sangar and Sar Gar Borāzjān) is a village in Ahmadabad Rural District, in the Central District of Firuzabad County, Fars province, Iran. At the 2006 census, its population was 931, in 208 families.
