= Savernake, New South Wales =

Savernake New South Wales
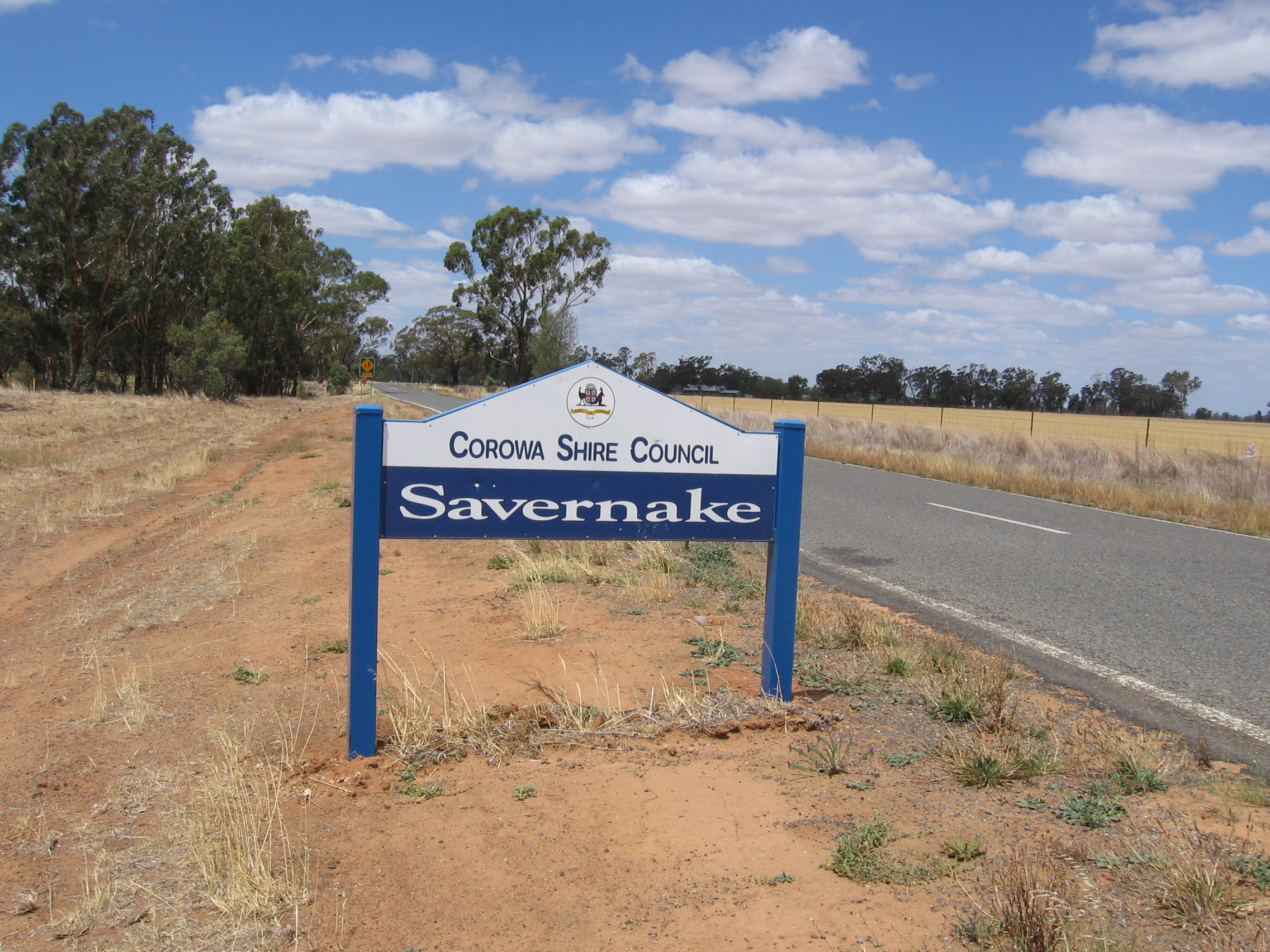
- The entry to Savernake approaching from Berrigan.

- Coordinates: 35°44′0″S 146°03′0″E
- Population: 94
- Postcode(s): 2646
- Location: 13 km (8 mi) from Rennie; 26 km (16 mi) from Berrigan; 292 km (181 mi) from Melbourne; 641 km (398 mi) from Sydney
- LGA(s): Federation Council
- County: Denison
- State electorate(s): Albury
- Federal division(s): Farrer

Savernake (/ˈsævərnæk/ SAV-ər-nak) is a village and rural community in the southern Riverina region of New South Wales, Australia. The village is located on the Riverina Highway, east of Berrigan, and in the Federation Council local government area.

The area has a population of 94

The Savernake School of the Arts Hall holds events throughout the year for the community.

== History ==
The first Savernake Post Office opened on 1 January 1890 and was renamed Warmatta in 1892 (and closed in 1927). The second Savernake Post Office opened in 1895 and closed in 1994.

== Savernake Football Club ==
Savernake Football Club won the 1902 Clear Hills Football Association premiership, winning five of their six games. They continued to play in the Clear Hills FA in 1903, then played in the Berrigan Football Association in 1904.

Savenake played in the Federal Football Association from 1905 to 1908.

Savernake FC was reformed and joined the Coreen & District Football Association in 1924 and in 1926 were under the guidance of Paddy Rector. Savernake FC continued to play in the Coreen & DFA from 1927 to 1928. Savernake then withdrew from the Coreen & DFA at the association's 1929 Annual General Meeting. They then returned to the Coreen & DFA in 1930. It appears there has not been a football from Savernake since 1930.

== Heritage listings ==
Savernake has a number of heritage-listed sites, including:

- 2341 Mulwala Road: Savernake Station

== Today ==
The village consists of a hall, primary school, a now abandoned shop and a few houses. The hall is used from time to time by the HotHouse theatre group, based in Albury-Wodonga, for small touring theatrical productions.

The main agricultural products of the area include sheep (for meat and wool), beef cattle, dryland cropping and pig production as well as some irrigated rice production.

The Savernake area has been part of a CSIRO project to understand the role of remnant woodlands in agricultural landscapes.

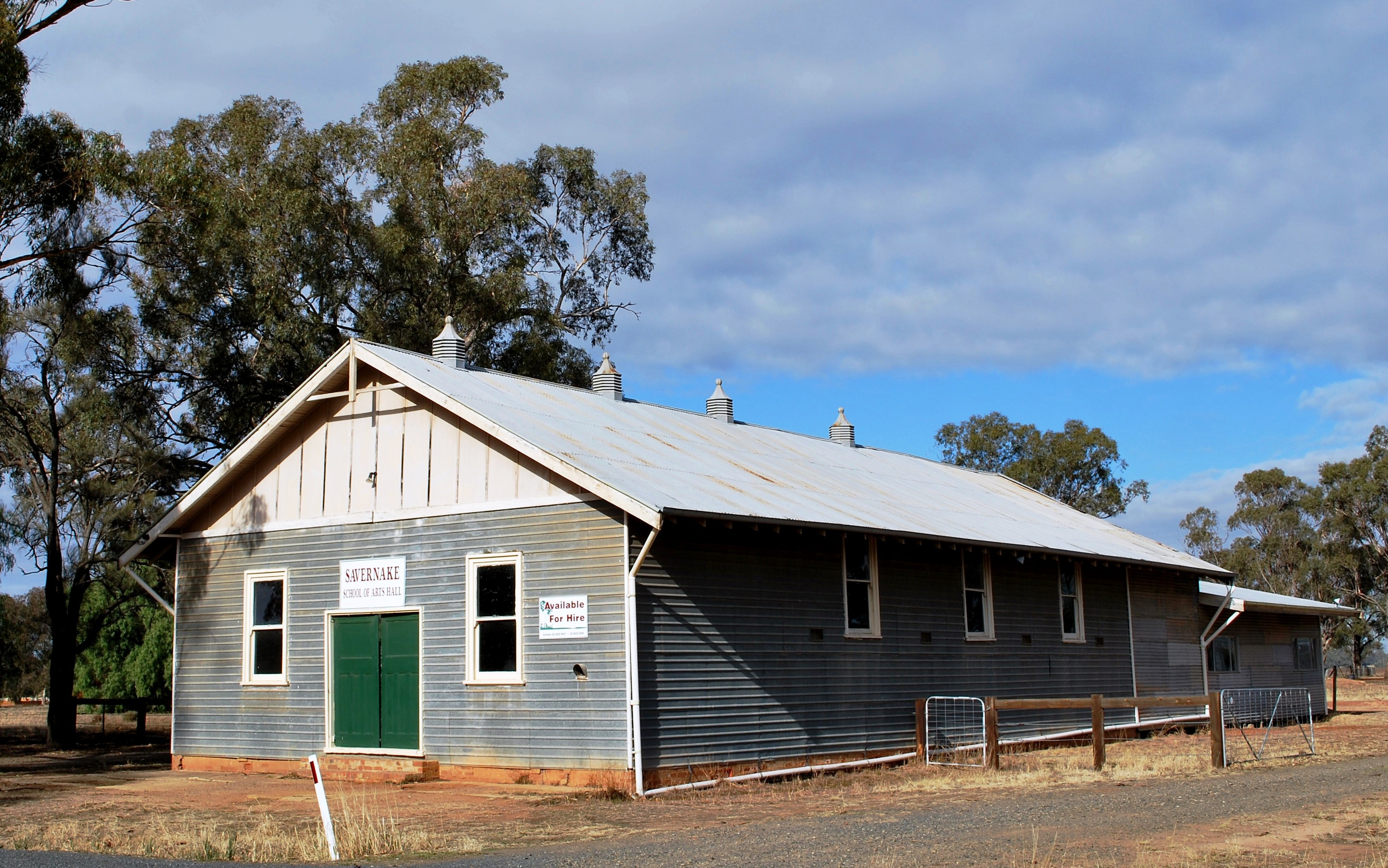
The School of Arts Hall at Savernake

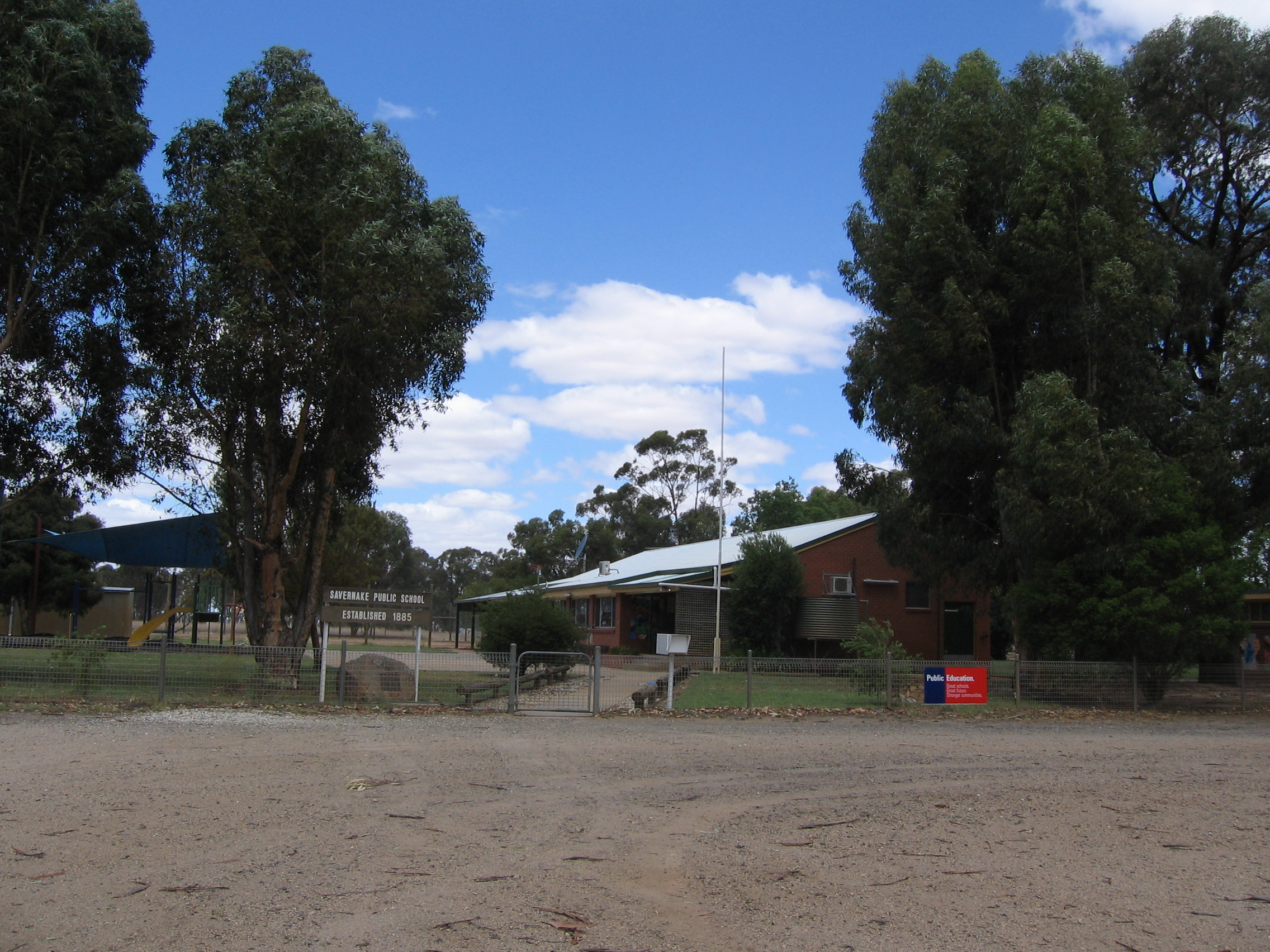
Savernake Public School

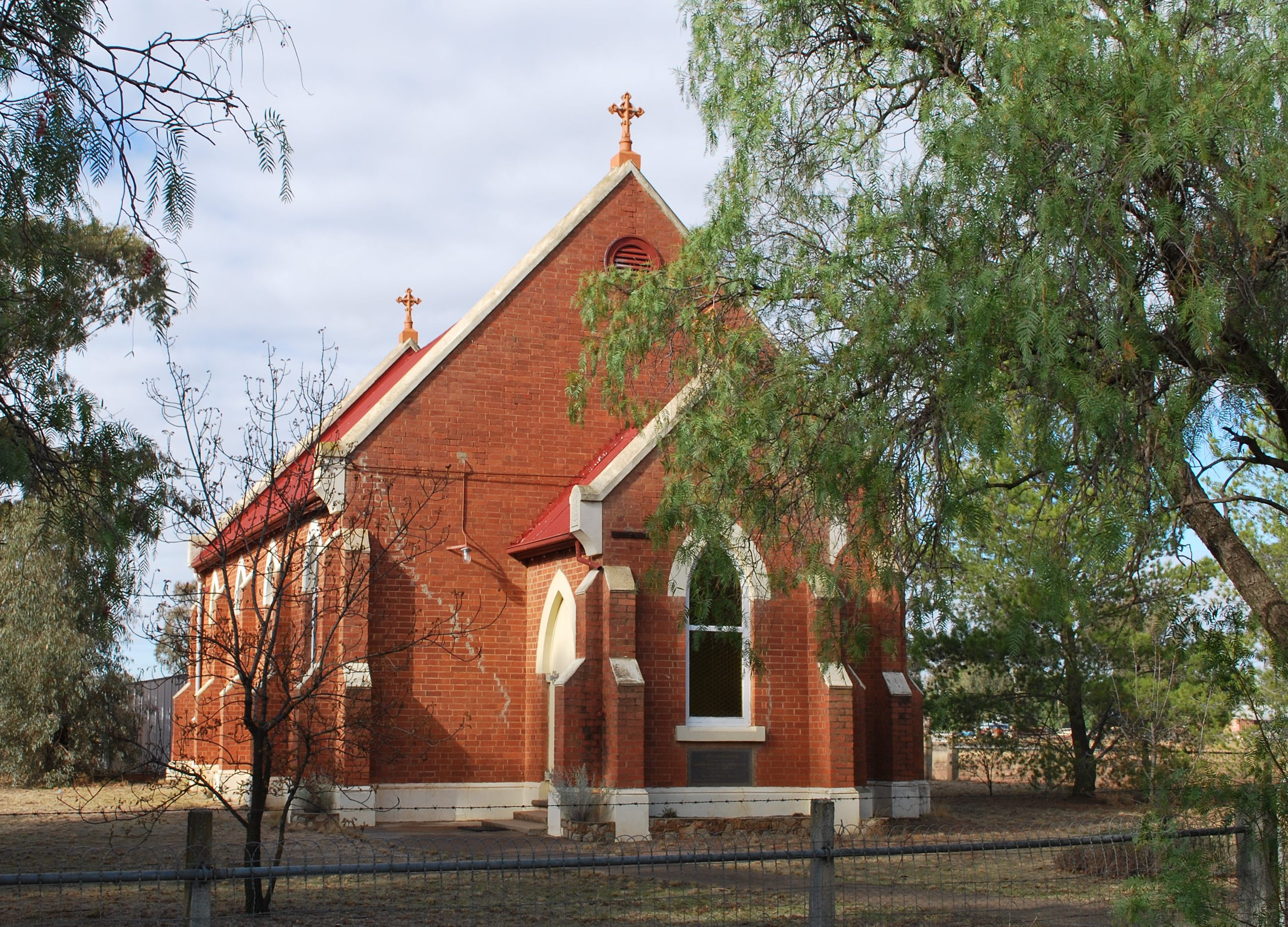
The Catholic Church at Savernake
