= Denison County =

Denison New South Wales
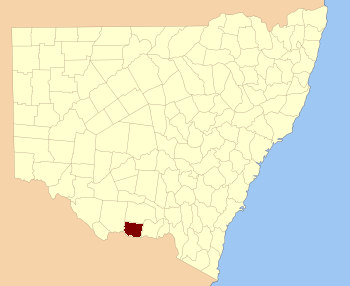
- Location in New South Wales
Lands administrative divisions around Denison:
Townsend	Urana	Urana
Townsend	Denison	Hume
Moira (Vic)	Moira (Vic)	Bogong (Vic)

Denison County is one of the 141 cadastral divisions of New South Wales. It contains the towns of Barooga and Berrigan.

Denison County was named in honour of the Governor-General of New South Wales, Sir William Thomas Denison (1804–1871).

== Parishes within this county ==
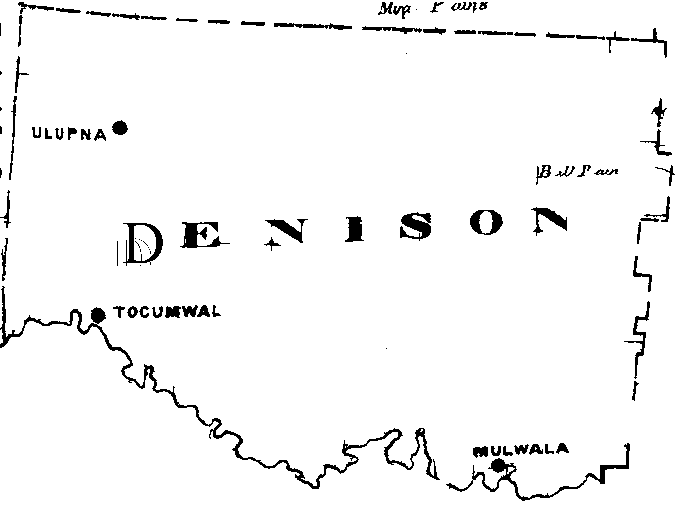
Denison County NSW as shown on John Sands 1886 map)

A full list of parishes found within this county; their current LGA and mapping coordinates to the approximate centre of each location is as follows:

Parish	LGA	Coordinates
Barooga	Berrigan Shire Council	35°49′54″S 145°40′04″E
Berrigan	Berrigan Shire Council	35°33′54″S 145°44′04″E
Boomanoomana	Berrigan Shire Council	35°54′54″S 145°54′04″E
Bull Plain	Federation Council	35°44′54″S 146°10′04″E
Carlyle	Berrigan Shire Council	35°49′54″S 145°54′04″E
Coreen West	Federation Council	35°38′54″S 146°14′04″E
Cottadidda	Berrigan Shire Council	35°54′54″S 145°45′04″E
Denison	Federation Council	35°47′54″S 146°09′04″E
Dry Forest	Federation Council	30°52′54″S 146°10′04″E
Finley	Berrigan Shire Council	35°38′54″S 145°36′04″E
Gereldery	Berrigan Shire Council	35°41′54″S 145°49′04″E
Headford	Berrigan Shire Council	35°44′54″S 145°42′04″E
Kilnyana	Berrigan Shire Council	35°45′54″S 145°55′04″E
Lalalty	Berrigan Shire Council	35°50′54″S 145°46′04″E
Langunya	Berrigan Shire Council	35°43′54″S 145°36′04″E
Momolong	Federation Council	35°35′54″S 146°00′04″E
Mulwala	Federation Council	35°55′54″S 146°01′04″E
Nangunia	Berrigan Shire Council	35°45′54″S 145°48′04″E
Narrow Plains	Federation Council	35°37′54″S 146°04′04″E
Osborne	Berrigan Shire Council	35°36′54″S 145°50′04″E
Sargood	Berrigan Shire Council	35°32′54″S 145°38′04″E
Savernake	Federation Council	35°45′54″S 146°01′04″E
Tocumwal	Berrigan Shire Council	35°46′54″S 145°33′04″E
Tongaboo	Berrigan Shire Council	35°32′54″S 145°34′04″E
Turramia	Federation Council	35°56′54″S 146°07′04″E
Ulupna	Berrigan Shire Council	35°37′54″S 145°33′04″E
Wahgunyah	Federation Council	35°50′54″S 146°02′04″E
Wangamong	Federation Council	35°37′54″S 146°08′04″E
Warmatta	Berrigan Shire Council	35°41′54″S 145°55′04″E
Warragubogra	Berrigan Shire Council	35°38′54″S 145°42′04″E
Woperana	Berrigan Shire Council	35°41′54″S 145°30′04″E
