= Rennie, New South Wales =

Rennie New South Wales
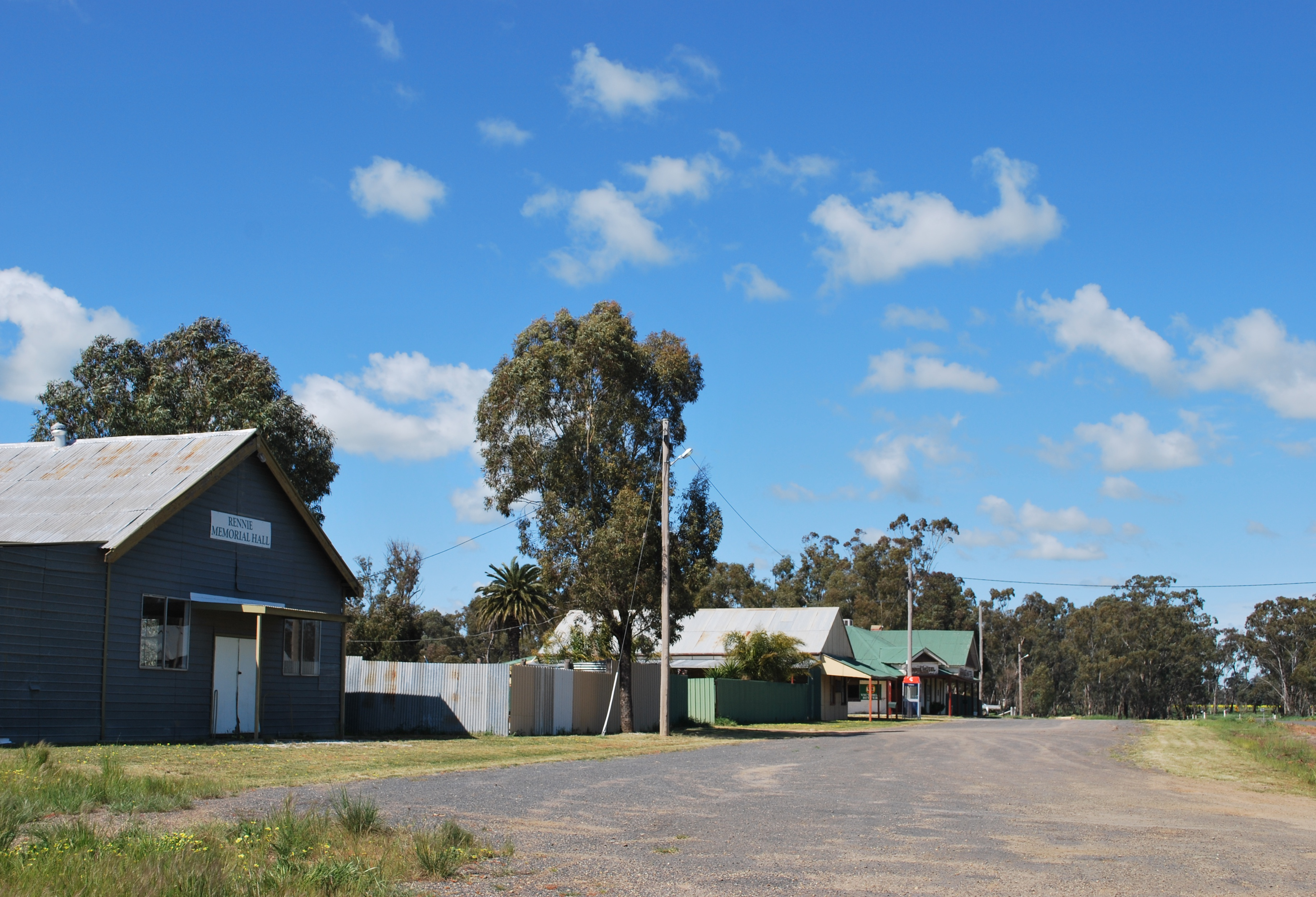
- The town of Rennie

- Coordinates: 35°49′0″S 146°08′0″E
- Population: 43 (2016 census)
- Postcode(s): 2646
- Elevation: 138 m (453 ft)
- Location: 626 km (389 mi) from Sydney; 302 km (188 mi) from Melbourne
- LGA(s): Federation Council
- County: Denison
- State electorate(s): Albury
- Federal division(s): Division of Farrer

Rennie is a town community in New South Wales, Australia. It is in the south-east of the Riverina about 10 kilometres south of Savernake and 19 kilometres from Mulwala.

Rennie Post Office opened on 1 February 1937 and closed in 1989.

Rennie is home to Rennie Football Club, playing in the Picola & District Football League.

== Transport ==
Rennie is served by a broad gauge branch of the Victorian Railways which extends to Oaklands, New South Wales and has been converted to standard gauge to meet the North East Railway.
