= Sadeqabad =

Sadeqabad, Sadiqabad or Sadiq Abad may refer to the following places:

== Iran ==
- Sadeqabad, Chaharmahal and Bakhtiari
- Sadeqabad-e Lachari, Fars Province
- Sadeqabad, Fasa, Fars Province
- Sadeqabad, Now Bandegan, Fars Province
- Sadeqabad, Jahrom, Fars Province
- Sadeqabad, Kharameh, Fars Province
- Sadeqabad, Rizab, Fars Province
- Sadeqabad, Sepidan, Fars Province
- Sadeqabad, Golestan
- Sadeqabad, Hamadan
- Sadeqabad-e Qapanuri, Hamadan Province
- Sadeqabad, Falavarjan, Isfahan Province
- Sadeqabad, Isfahan, Isfahan Province
- Sadeqabad, Lenjan, Isfahan Province
- Sadeqabad, Bagh-e Bahadoran, Isfahan Province
- Sadeqabad, Semirom, Isfahan Province
- Sadeqabad, Kermanshah
- Sadeqabad-e Sagbu, Khuzestan Province
- Sadeqabad, Bijar, Kurdistan Province
- Sadeqabad, Dehgolan, Kurdistan Province
- Sadeqabad, Divandarreh, Kurdistan Province
- Sadeqabad, Lorestan
- Sadeqabad, Markazi
- Sadeqabad, Mazandaran
- Sadeqabad, North Khorasan
- Sadeqabad, Buin Zahra, Qazvin Province
- Sadeqabad, Takestan, Qazvin Province
- Sadeqabad, Razavi Khorasan
- Sadeqabad, Tehran, a village in Rey County
- Sadeqabad, West Azerbaijan
- Sadeqabad, Abarkuh, Yazd Province
- Sadeqabad, Bafq, Yazd Province
- Sadeqabad, Dehshir, Yazd Province
- Sadeqabad, Pishkuh, Yazd Province

== Pakistan ==
- Sadiqabad, Punjab
- Sadiq Abad, Bajaur
