= Sadiq (name) =

- Gender: Male

Origin
- Meaning: "Truthful"

Other names
- Related names: Sadek; Sadeq; Sadegh
- See also: Zadoc

Sadiq (Arabic: صادق) is a masculine given name and surname of Arabic origin. The most prominent bearer of the name is Ja'far al-Sadiq, the 8th-century Muslim scholar and scientist, considered as an Imam and founder of the Ja'fari school of jurisprudence by Twelver and Isma'ili Shi’as, and a major figure in the Hanafi and Maliki schools of Sunni jurisprudence, known at times simply as Sadiq (The Truthful). Notable people with the name include:

== Mononym ==
- Sadiq (Indian actor) (born 1956), or Mohammed Sadiq, Indian actor
- Mir Sadiq or Gudu Khan (died 1799), Indian politician

== Titular ==
Sadiq or As-Sadiq (Al-Sadiq) can be used as an epithet:

- Muhammad III as-Sadiq or 'As-Sadiq' (Arabic: الصادق) meaning 'the righteous') (1813–1882), Husainid Bey of Tunis
- Abdullah Hashem Aba Al-Sadiq (born 1983), Egyptian-American religious leader and founder of the Ahmadi Religion of Peace and Light

== Given name ==
- Sadiq-ur-Rashid Ibrahim Abbasi (1928–2002), Pakistani general, Governor of Sindh
- Sadiq Abdullahi (born 1960), Nigerian tennis player
- Sadiq Abdulkarim Abdulrahman (born 1966), Libyan politician and physician who served as first deputy prime minister
- Sadiq Adebiyi (born 1997), Nigerian rugby league footballer
- Sadiq Ahangaran (born 1957), Iranian Zaker (Karbala/Ahlul-Bayt tragedies reciter)
- Sadiq al-Ahmar (1956–2023), Yemeni politician and the leader of the Hashid tribal federation
- Sadiq Alhassan (born 1996), Ghanaian footballer
- Sadiq Ali (1952–2011), Indian politician from Kashmir, poet, writer and environmentalist activist
- Sadiq Ali (freedom fighter) (1910–2001), Indian politician and freedom fighter
- Sadiq Ali (general), Pakistani Army general
- Sadiq Jalal Al-Azm (1934–2016), Syrian professor of Modern European Philosophy
- Sadiq Batcha (1972–2011), Indian entrepreneur
- Sadiq Daba (1951/52–2021), Nigerian actor and former broadcaster
- Sadiq Dadashov (1905–1946), Azerbaijani architect and architecture historian
- Sadiq al-Damaluji (1880–1958), Iraqi historian and writer
- Sadiq Fakir (1967–2015), Pakistani singer of Sindhi music
- Sadiq Farhad, Afghan cricketer
- Sadiq El Fitouri (born 1994), Libyan professional footballer
- Sadiq Al-Ghariani (born 1942), Grand Mufti of Libya
- Sadiq Gurbanov (born 1972), Azerbaijani politician
- Sadiq Ibrahim (born 1964), Nigerian politician and lawyer
- Sadiq Iftikhar, Pakistani politician
- Sadiq Jaber (born 1960), Iraqi footballer
- Sadiq ul Khairi (1915–1989), Indian born Pakistani Urdu novelist, playwright, and translator
- Sadiq Khan (born 1970), British politician
- Sadiq Muhammad Khan or Sir Sadiq Muhammad Khan V Abbasi (1904–1966), the Nawab, and later Amir, of Bahawalpur State
- Sadiq Mahmud Khurram (born 1973), Pakistani jurist
- Sadiq-ur-Rahman Kidwai, Indian writer, academician
- Sadiq Kirmani (born 1989), Indian cricketer
- Sadiq Larijani (born 1963), Iranian cleric and politician
- Sadiq al-Mahdi, also known as Sadiq as-Siddiq (1935–2020), Sudanese political and religious figure
- Sadiq Ali Memon, Pakistani politician, member of the National Assembly of Pakistan
- Sadiq Mohammad (born 1945), Pakistani cricketer
- Sadiq Al-Mohsin (born 1997), Saudi Arabian handball player
- Sadiq Mousa (born 1959), Iraqi footballer
- Sadiq Nawaz, fictional character from Ackley Bridge
- Sadiq Quliyev (born 1995), Azerbaijani footballer
- Sadiq Hussain Qureshi (1927–2000), Pakistani politician, Governor and Chief Minister of Punjab in the 1970s
- Syed Saddiq Syed Abdul Rahman (born 1992), Malaysian politician
- Sadiq Saadoun (born 1972), Iraqi footballer
- Sadiq Sani Sadiq (born 1981), Nigerian film actor
- Sadıq Sadıqov (1965–2026), Azerbaijani sports administrator, President of the Neftchi Baku PFK
- Sadiq Sanjrani (born 1978), Pakistani politician
- Sadiq Ali Shahzad (1951–2016), Pakistani sculptor
- Sadiq Al Shehabi (1944–2017), Bahraini politician
- Sadiq Hussaini Shirazi (born 1942), Iranian Twelver Shia Marja'
- Sadiq Sillah (born 1969), Sierra Leonean politician
- Sadiq Sulieman Umar (born 1970), Nigerian politician
- Sadiq Zazzabi (born 1970), Nigerian Hausa language singer and songwriter

== Middle name ==
- Abubakar Sadiq A. Mohammed (born 1961), Nigerian politician and government minister
- Ghulam Sadiq Khan (1939–2016), Indian classical vocalist
- Jam Sadiq Ali (1934–1992), Pakistani politician
- Muhammad Sadiq Ardestani (died 1721), an Iranian Shia philosophers during Safavid period
- Suleiman Sadiq Umar (born 1971), Nigerian politician and Senator
- Tahir Sadiq Khan (born 1950), Pakistani politician, member of the National Assembly of Pakistan
- Muhammad Saddiq Al-Minshawi (1920–1969), Egyptian reciter of the Quran

== Surname ==
- Agha Sadiq (1909–1977), Pakistani writer and poet
- Ahmed Sadiq (born 1979), Nigerian boxer
- Ayaz Sadiq (born 1954), Pakistani politician, member of the National Assembly of Pakistan
- Ayman Sadiq (born 1992), Bangladeshi educator, entrepreneur and founder of 10 Minute School
- Ghazi al-Sadiq (died 2012), Sudanese politician and government minister
- Ghulam Mohammed Sadiq (1912–1971), Indian politician, Prime Minister of Jammu and Kashmir from 1964 to 1965
- Hana Sadiq, Iraqi fashion designer
- Ibrahim Sadiq (born 2000), Ghanaian footballer
- Kalbe Sadiq (1939–2020), or Moulana Dr. Kalbe Sadiq, Islamic scholar, thinker, reformer, educationist and preacher
- Karim Sadiq (born 1984), Afghan cricketer
- Kenyon Sadiq (born 2005), American football player
- Mirwais Sadiq (1973–2004), Afghan politician and government minister
- Muhammad Sadiq (disambiguation), multiple people
- Munir Sadiq (born 1955), Pakistani sportsman and medalist in sailing
- Nauman Sadiq (born 1979), Pakistani cricketer
- Nuzhat Sadiq, Pakistani politician, member of the Senate of Pakistan
- Rashidat Sadiq (born 1981), Nigerian women's basketball player
- S M Sadiq, or Sheikh Muhammad Sadiq, Pakistani lyricist and poet
- Saba Sadiq (born 1966), Pakistani politician, member of the Provincial Assembly of the Punjab
- Sayed Sadiq (1945–2025), Egyptian actor
- Shagufta Sadiq, Pakistani politician, member of the National Assembly of Pakistan
- Shazia Sadiq, Australian computer scientist
- Umar Sadiq (born 1997), Nigerian footballer
- Yousif Muhammed Sadiq (born 1978), Iraqi Kurdish politician
- Zahid Sadiq (born 1965), Kenyan cricketer

== See also ==
- Sadykhov/Sadykov
- Sadek (disambiguation)
- Sadeq (disambiguation)
- Sadegh (disambiguation)
- Siddiq (name)
- Siddique (disambiguation)
- Sadiq Abad (disambiguation)
- Al-Sadiq Mosque or Wabash Mosque, a mosque in the Bronzeville neighborhood in city of Chicago funded with the money predominantly donated by African-American Ahmadi Muslim converts
- Sadiq Public School (SPS), a Pakistani college-preparatory boarding school located in Bahawalpur, Punjab, Pakistan
