= Sadeque =

Sadeque is a masculine given name and surname of Arabic origin. Notable people with the name include:

== Given name ==
- Sadeque Hossain Khoka (1952–2019), Bangladeshi politician

== Surname ==
- Abdus Sadeque (1946–2026), Pakistani and Bangladeshi field hockey player
- Najma Sadeque (1943–2015), Pakistani journalist, author, and human rights activist

== See also ==
- Sadek (disambiguation)
- Sadeq (disambiguation)
- Sadiq (disambiguation)
- Sadegh (disambiguation)
- Siddiq (name)
- Siddique (disambiguation)
