= Aliabad-e Qoroq =

Village in Fars province, Iran

Aliabad-e Qoroq Persian: علي ابادقرق
- Village
- Location within Iran
- Coordinates: 29°54′46″N 52°32′15″E
- Country: Iran
- Province: Fars
- County: Beyza
- District: Central
- Rural District: Kushk-e Hezar

Population (2016)
  - Total: 344
- Time zone: UTC+3:30 (IRST)

Aliabad-e Qoroq (Persian: علي ابادقرق) (Note: Also romanized as 'Alīābād-e Qoroq; also known as 'Alīābād-e Pā’īn and Ali Abadé Sofla) is a village in Kushk-e Hezar Rural District of the Central District of Beyza County, Fars province, Iran.

== Demographics ==
=== Population ===
At the time of the 2006 National Census, the village's population was 303 in 79 households, when it was in the former Beyza District of Sepidan County. The following census in 2011 counted 231 people in 71 households. The 2016 census measured the population of the village as 344 people in 96 households.

In 2019, the district was separated from the county in the establishment of Beyza County, and the rural district was transferred to the new Central District.
