= Aliabad-e Sar Tang =

Village in Fars province, Iran

Aliabad-e Sar Tang Persian: علي ابادسرتنگ
- Village
- Location within Iran
- Coordinates: 29°59′50″N 52°19′34″E
- Country: Iran
- Province: Fars
- County: Beyza
- District: Central
- Rural District: Beyza

Population (2016)
  - Total: 502
- Time zone: UTC+3:30 (IRST)

Aliabad-e Sar Tang (Persian: علي ابادسرتنگ) (Note: Also romanized as 'Alīābād-e Sar Tang; also known as 'Alīābād-e Tang) is a village in Beyza Rural District of the Central District of Beyza County, Fars province, Iran.

== Demographics ==
=== Population ===
At the time of the 2006 National Census, the village's population was 554 in 126 households, when it was in the former Beyza District of Sepidan County. The following census in 2011 counted 493 people in 156 households. The 2016 census measured the population of the village as 502 people in 154 households.

In 2019, the district was separated from the county in the establishment of Beyza County, and the rural district was transferred to the new Central District.
