= Sadik =

Saadiq is an Arabic masculine given name (feminine version صادقه Saadiqah). The name means "Truthfull" and is derived from the Arabic word Sadeeq صديق which is translated as friend. The Arabic word for friend is derived from the root sadak َصَدَق which refers to honesty, truthfulness and loyalty. Variants of the name include Sadik, Sadek, Sadiq, Siddiq, Siddique, Sidqi etc. Notable people with the name include:

- Sadik Ahmed (born 1977), British Bangladeshi film director, cinematographer, writer, producer
- Jamil Sidqi Al-Zahawi (born in 1863) was a prominent Iraqi poet and philosopher. Passed away in 1936
- Sadik Albayrak (born 1942), Turkish journalist and author
- Sadik Balarabe (born 1992), English footballer
- Sadık Giz (1911–1979), Turkish politician
- Sadik Hakim (1919–1983), American jazz pianist
- Sadik Harchaoui (born 1973), Moroccan-Dutch legal academic
- Sadik Kaceli (1914–2000), Albanian painter
- Sadiq Khan (born 1970), Mayor of London
- Sadik Mikhou (born 1990), Moroccan middle distance runner
- Sadik Mujkič (born 1968), Slovenian rower
- Sadik Yemni (born 1951), Dutch novelist of Turkish extraction

== See also ==
- Sadik (disambiguation)
- Sadek (disambiguation)
- Sadiq (disambiguation)
- Sadegh (disambiguation)
- Siddique (disambiguation)
- Sadique
