= Aliabad-e Sar Tol, Fars =

Village in Fars province, Iran

Aliabad-e Sar Tol Persian: علي ابادسرتل
- Village
- Location within Iran
- Coordinates: 29°54′00″N 52°30′47″E
- Country: Iran
- Province: Fars
- County: Beyza
- District: Central
- Rural District: Kushk-e Hezar

Population (2016)
  - Total: 344
  - Density: 990/km^{2} (2,600/sq mi)
- Time zone: UTC+3:30 (IRST)

Aliabad-e Sar Tol (Persian: علي ابادسرتل) (Note: Also romanized as 'Alīābād-e Sar Tol; also known as 'Aliābād and 'Alīābād-e Sartolī) is a village in Kushk-e Hezar Rural District of the Central District of Beyza County, Fars province, Iran.

== Demographics ==
=== Population ===
At the time of the 2006 National Census, the village's population was 949 in 233 households, when it was in the former Beyza District of Sepidan County. The following census in 2011 counted 1,111 people in 300 households. The 2016 census measured the population of the village as 990 people in 292 households.

In 2019, the district was separated from the county in the establishment of Beyza County, and the rural district was transferred to the new Central District.
