= Doshman Ziari =

Village in Fars province, Iran

Doshman Ziari Persian: دشمن زياري
- Village
- Location within Iran
- Coordinates: 30°04′22″N 52°22′22″E
- Country: Iran
- Province: Fars
- County: Beyza
- District: Banesh
- Rural District: Haftkhan

Population (2016)
  - Total: 1,777
- Time zone: UTC+3:30 (IRST)

Doshman Ziari (Persian: دشمن زياري) (Note: Also romanized as Doshman Zīārī; also known as Doshman Zīādī and Dushman Zīāri) is a village in, and the capital of, Haftkhan Rural District of Banesh District, Beyza County, Fars province, Iran.

== Demographics ==
=== Population ===
At the time of the 2006 National Census, the village's population was 1,530 in 345 households, when it was in Banesh Rural District of the former Beyza District of Sepidan County. The following census in 2011 counted 1,586 people in 457 households. The 2016 census measured the population of the village as 1,777 people in 501 households.

In 2019, the district was separated from the county in the establishment of Beyza County, and the rural district was transferred to the new Banesh District. Doshman Ziari was transferred to Haftkhan Rural District created in the district.
