= Jian, Beyza =

Village in Fars province, Iran

Jian Persian: جيان
- Village
- Location within Iran
- Coordinates: 30°01′00″N 52°16′59″E
- Country: Iran
- Province: Fars
- County: Beyza
- District: Central
- Rural District: Beyza

Population (2016)
  - Total: 1,905
- Time zone: UTC+3:30 (IRST)

Jian (Persian: جيان) (Note: Also romanized as Jīān and Jīyān) is a village in Beyza Rural District of the Central District of Beyza County, Fars province, Iran.

== Demographics ==
=== Population ===
At the time of the 2006 National Census, the village's population was 2,107 in 444 households, when it was in the former Beyza District of Sepidan County. The following census in 2011 counted 1,983 people in 577 households. The 2016 census measured the population of the village as 1,905 people in 561 households. It was the most populous village in its rural district.

In 2019, the district was separated from the county in the establishment of Beyza County, and the rural district was transferred to the new Central District.
