= Kushk-e Hezar =

Village in Fars province, Iran

Kushk-e Hezar Persian: كوشك هزار
- Village
- Location within Iran
- Coordinates: 29°52′55″N 52°31′33″E
- Country: Iran
- Province: Fars
- County: Beyza
- District: Central
- Rural District: Kushk-e Hezar

Population (2016)
  - Total: 2,477
- Time zone: UTC+3:30 (IRST)

Kushk-e Hezar (Persian: كوشك هزار) (Note: Also romanized as Kūshk Hezār, Kūshk-e Hazār, and Kūshk-e Hezār; also known as Khushk, Kūshk, and Kūshk-e Hezār Qal‘eh) is a village in, and the capital of, Kushk-e Hezar Rural District of the Central District of Beyza County, Fars province, Iran.

== Demographics ==
=== Population ===
At the time of the 2006 National Census, the village's population was 1,898 in 466 households, when it was in the former Beyza District of Sepidan County. The following census in 2011 counted 2,227 people in 616 households. The 2016 census measured the population of the village as 2,477 people in 745 households.

In 2019, the district was separated from the county in the establishment of Beyza County, and the rural district was transferred to the new Central District.
