= Sheykh Abud =

Village in Fars province, Iran

Sheykh Abud Persian: شيخ عبود
- Village
- Location within Iran
- Coordinates: 29°51′12″N 52°33′45″E
- Country: Iran
- Province: Fars
- County: Beyza
- District: Central
- Rural District: Kushk-e Hezar

Population (2016)
  - Total: 3,181
- Time zone: UTC+3:30 (IRST)

Sheykh Abud (Persian: شيخ عبود) (Note: Also romanized as Sheykh ‘Abbūd, Sheykh ‘Abūd, and Sheykh Abūd; also known as Shaikhābād, Sheykh ‘Abūd-e Beyẕā', and Sheykh ‘Obbūd) is a village in Kushk-e Hezar Rural District of the Central District of Beyza County, Fars province, Iran.

== Demographics ==
=== Population ===
At the time of the 2006 National Census, the village's population was 2,906 in 706 households, when it was in the former Beyza District of Sepidan County. The following census in 2011 counted 2,805 people in 799 households. The 2016 census measured the population of the village as 3,181 people in 944 households. It was the most populous village in its rural district.

In 2019, the district was separated from the county in the establishment of Beyza County, and the rural district was transferred to the new Central District.
