= Baba Kuhak =

Baba Kuhak باباكوهك
- Village
- Location within Iran
- Coordinates: 30°05′00″N 52°30′00″E
- Country: Iran
- Province: Fars
- County: Sepidan
- Bakhsh: Beyza
- Rural District: Banesh

Population (2006)
  - Total: 145
- Time zone: UTC+3:30 (IRST)
  - Summer (DST): UTC+4:30 (IRDT)

Baba Kuhak (Persian: باباكوهك, also Romanized as Bābā Kūhak) is a village in Banesh Rural District, Beyza District, Sepidan County, Fars province, Iran. At the 2006 census, its population was 145, in 35 families.
