= Zakian =

Village in Fars, Iran

Zakian زكيان
- Village
- Location within Iran
- Coordinates: 30°05′41″N 52°30′26″E
- Country: Iran
- Province: Fars
- County: Sepidan
- Bakhsh: Beyza
- Rural District: Banesh

Population (2006)
  - Total: 254
- Time zone: UTC+3:30 (IRST)
  - Summer (DST): UTC+4:30 (IRDT)

Zakian (Persian: زكيان, also Romanized as Zakīān, Zakeyān, and Zakīyān; also known as Bābā Kūhak, Kūrnī, and Zakīān-e Bābā Kūhak) is a village in Banesh Rural District, Beyza District, Sepidan County, Fars province, Iran. At the 2006 census, its population was 254, in 53 families.
