= Tall-e Beyza (village) =

Tall-e Beyza تل بيضا
- Village
- Interactive map of Tall-e Beyza
- Coordinates: 29°58′19″N 52°24′03″E
- Country: Iran
- Province: Fars
- County: Sepidan
- Bakhsh: Beyza
- Rural District: Beyza

Population (2006)
  - Total: 801
- Time zone: UTC+3:30 (IRST)
  - Summer (DST): UTC+4:30 (IRDT)

Tall-e Beyza (Persian: تل بيضا, also Romanized as Tall-e Beyẕā, Tal-e Baiza, and Tol-e Beyẕā) is a village in Beyza Rural District, Beyza District, Sepidan County, Fars province, Iran. At the 2006 census, its population was 801, in 202 families.
