= Sibuiyeh =

Sibuiyeh سيبويه
- Village
- Interactive map of Sibuiyeh
- Coordinates: 30°02′36″N 52°19′03″E
- Country: Iran
- Province: Fars
- County: Sepidan
- Bakhsh: Beyza
- Rural District: Beyza

Population (2006)
  - Total: 557
- Time zone: UTC+3:30 (IRST)
  - Summer (DST): UTC+4:30 (IRDT)

Sibuiyeh (Persian: سيبويه, also Romanized as Sībūīyeh) is a village in Beyza Rural District, Beyza District, Sepidan County, Fars province, Iran. At the 2006 census, its population was 557, in 110 families.
