= Habashabad =

Habashabad حبش اباد
- Village
- Location within Iran
- Coordinates: 30°00′02″N 52°20′35″E
- Country: Iran
- Province: Fars
- County: Sepidan
- Bakhsh: Beyza
- Rural District: Beyza

Population (2006)
  - Total: 141
- Time zone: UTC+3:30 (IRST)
  - Summer (DST): UTC+4:30 (IRDT)

Habashabad (Persian: حبش اباد, also Romanized as Ḩabashābād) is a village in Beyza Rural District, Beyza District, Sepidan County, Fars province, Iran. At the 2006 census, its population was 141, in 30 families.
