= Banesh =

Village in Fars province, Iran

Banesh Persian: بانش
- Village
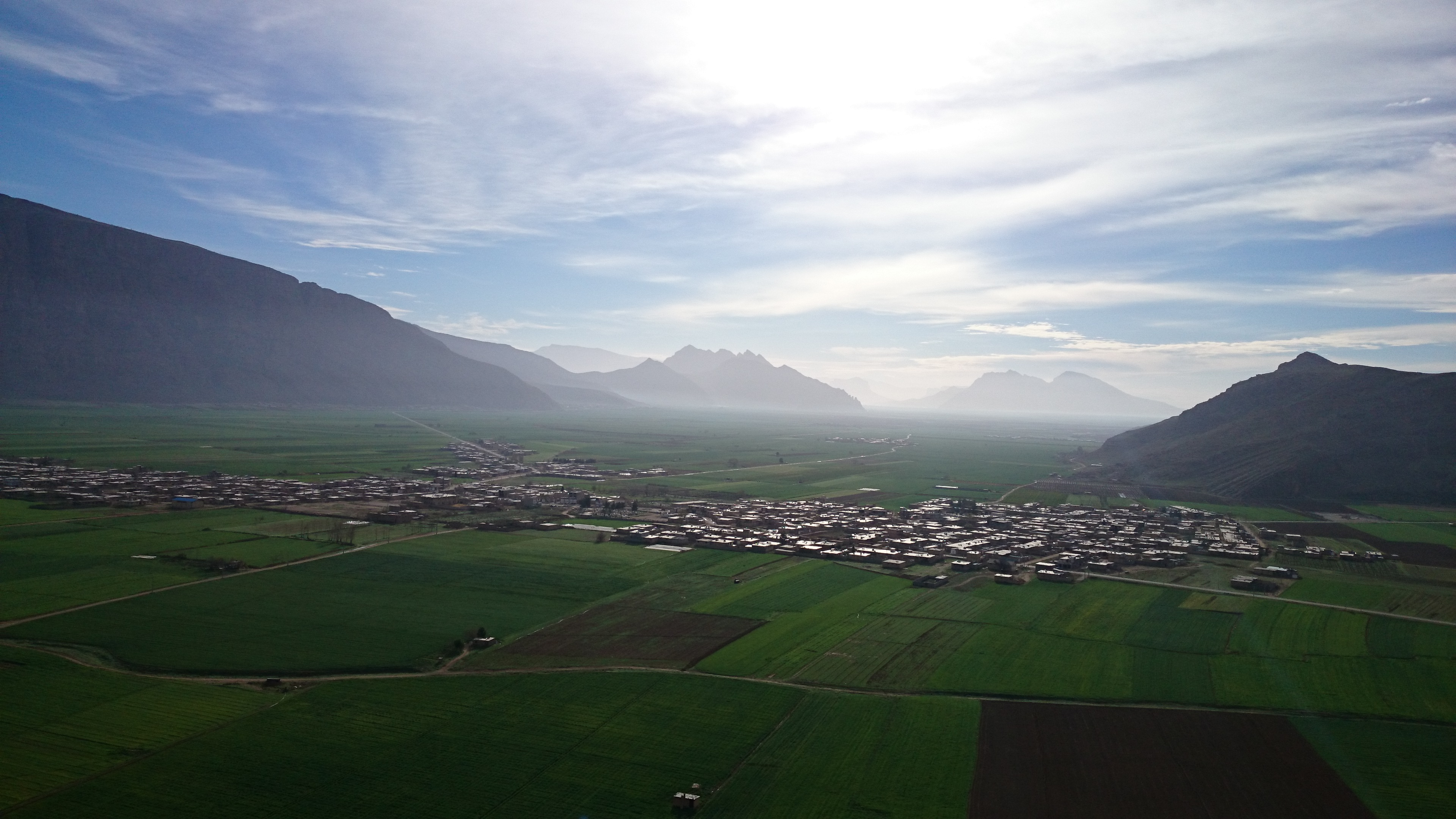
- Banesh landscape and village

- Location within Iran
- Coordinates: 30°05′48″N 52°25′41″E
- Country: Iran
- Province: Fars
- County: Beyza
- District: Banesh
- Rural District: Banesh

Population (2016)
  - Total: 2,873
- Time zone: UTC+3:30 (IRST)

Banesh (Persian: بانش) (Note: Also romanized as Bānesh; also known as Bānish) is a village in Banesh Rural District of Banesh District, Beyza County, Fars province, Iran, serving as capital of both the district and the rural district. The village is 60 km north of Shiraz.

== Demographics ==
=== Population ===
At the time of the 2006 National Census, the village's population was 2,904 in 688 households, when it was in the former Beyza District of Sepidan County. The following census in 2011 counted 2,837 people in 875 households. The 2016 census measured the population of the village as 2,873 people in 851 households. It was the most populous village in its rural district.

In 2019, the district was separated from the county in the establishment of Beyza County, and the rural district was transferred to the new Banesh District.

== Archaeology ==
This area was occupied from the sixth millennium BC. During the Proto-Elamite period (late fourth millennium BC), the nearby Anshan became one of the main cities of the Elamite region, thanks to its location on important trade routes.

== Banesh Period ==
Banesh is the typesite for one of the earliest cultural phases in Iran, known as the Banesh period. It is dated in 3400-2800 BC.

In the Early Banesh phase, around 3300 BC, Proto-Elamite culture emerged in the Kur River (or Kor River) basin. During the Susa III period (c. 3200 BC), when Susa was reestablished, its pottery was predominantly Banesh style, also featuring characteristic Proto-Elamite administrative devices.

Banesh is part of the Marv Dasht area, which is a complex of several interconnected valleys and plains. During the mid-late Banesh Period (3100-2800 BC) Anshan was a huge city. It also featured a number of subsidiary villages and campsites.

"Comprehensive studies of Banesh plant (Miller 1990) and animal (Zeder 1988, 1991) remains show that Banesh people focused on intensive cultivation of wheat and herding of sheep. Some craft activity, particularly ceramic and some stone vessel manufacture, was concentrated in specialized villages, at least earlier in the period (Alden 1982). In the main center, however, other craft activity, specifically copper processing, is attested only as small production areas in domestic contexts (Nicholas 1990)."

== See also ==
- Elam
