= Ayas Jan =

Ayas Jan اياس جان
- Village
- Location within Iran
- Coordinates: 30°02′18″N 52°18′30″E
- Country: Iran
- Province: Fars
- County: Sepidan
- Bakhsh: Beyza
- Rural District: Beyza

Population (2006)
  - Total: 1,009
- Time zone: UTC+3:30 (IRST)
  - Summer (DST): UTC+4:30 (IRDT)

Ayas Jan (Persian: اياس جان, also Romanized as Ayās Jān; also known as Ayāz Jān, Yāsgūn, and Yāstagān) is a village in Beyza Rural District, Beyza District, Sepidan County, Fars province, Iran. At the 2006 census, its population was 1,009, in 239 families.
