= Dar Faraghat Agricultural Institute =

Dar Faraghat Agricultural Institute موسسه فلاحت در فراغت
- Village/agricultural institute
- Country: Iran
- Province: Fars
- County: Sepidan
- Bakhsh: Beyza
- Rural District: Kushk-e Hezar

Population (2006)
  - Total: 14
- Time zone: UTC+3:30 (IRST)
  - Summer (DST): UTC+4:30 (IRDT)

Dar Faraghat Agricultural Institute (Persian: موسسه فلاحت در فراغت – Mūsaseh Felāḩet-e Dar Farāghat) is a village and agricultural institute in Kushk-e Hezar Rural District, Beyza District, Sepidan County, Fars province, Iran. At the 2006 census, its population was 14, in 8 families.
