= Haftkhan =

Haftkhan هفت خان
- Village
- Location within Iran
- Coordinates: 30°03′09″N 52°22′53″E
- Country: {Iran
- Province: Fars
- County: Sepidan
- Bakhsh: Beyza
- Rural District: Banesh

Population (2006)
  - Total: 462
- Time zone: UTC+3:30 (IRST)
  - Summer (DST): UTC+4:30 (IRDT)

Haftkhan (Persian: هفت خان, also Romanized as Haftkhān; also known as Hafkūn and Haft Khvān) is a village in Banesh Rural District, Beyza District, Sepidan County, Fars province, Iran. At the 2006 census, its population was 462, in 109 families.
