= Shah Qotb ol Din =

Shah Qotb ol Din شاه قطبالدين
- Village
- Location within Iran
- Coordinates: 29°58′19″N 52°23′33″E
- Country: Iran
- Province: Fars
- County: Sepidan
- Bakhsh: Beyza
- Rural District: Beyza

Population (2006)
  - Total: 510
- Time zone: UTC+3:30 (IRST)
  - Summer (DST): UTC+4:30 (IRDT)

Shah Qotb ol Din (Persian: شاه قطبالدين, also Romanized as Shāh Qoṭb ol Dīn and Shāh Qoṭb od Dīn) is a village in Beyza Rural District, Beyza District, Sepidan County, Fars province, Iran. At the 2006 census, its population was 510, in 126 families.
