= Gervan, Fars =

Gervan گروان
- Village
- Location within Iran
- Coordinates: 30°02′50″N 52°25′01″E
- Country: Iran
- Province: Fars
- County: Sepidan
- Bakhsh: Beyza
- Rural District: Beyza

Population (2006)
  - Total: 205
- Time zone: UTC+3:30 (IRST)
  - Summer (DST): UTC+4:30 (IRDT)

Gervan (Persian: گروان, also Romanized as Gervān and Garrevān) is a village in Beyza Rural District, Beyza District, Sepidan County, Fars province, Iran. At the 2006 census, its population was 205, in 50 families.
