= Babolbam =

Babolbam باب البام
- Village
- Location within Iran
- Coordinates: 29°58′58″N 52°24′15″E
- Country: Iran
- Province: Fars
- County: Sepidan
- Bakhsh: Beyza
- Rural District: Beyza

Population (2006)
  - Total: 403
- Time zone: UTC+3:30 (IRST)
  - Summer (DST): UTC+4:30 (IRDT)

Babolbam (Persian: باب البام, also Romanized as Bābolbām and Bāb ol Bām) is a village in Beyza Rural District, Beyza District, Sepidan County, Fars province, Iran. At the 2006 census, its population was 403, in 102 families.
