= Denjan =

Denjan دنجان
- Village
- Location within Iran
- Coordinates: 29°57′35″N 52°24′06″E
- Country: Iran
- Province: Fars
- County: Sepidan
- Bakhsh: Beyza
- Rural District: Kushk-e Hezar

Population (2006)
  - Total: 96
- Time zone: UTC+3:30 (IRST)
  - Summer (DST): UTC+4:30 (IRDT)

Denjan (Persian: دنجان, also Romanized as Denjān) is a village in Kushk-e Hezar Rural District, Beyza District, Sepidan County, Fars province, Iran. At the 2006 census, its population was 96, in 26 families.
