= Bosar Jan =

Bosar Jan بسارجان
- Village
- Location within Iran
- Coordinates: 30°02′10″N 52°26′05″E
- Country: Iran
- Province: Fars
- County: Sepidan
- Bakhsh: Beyza
- Rural District: Beyza

Population (2006)
  - Total: 339
- Time zone: UTC+3:30 (IRST)
  - Summer (DST): UTC+4:30 (IRDT)

Bosar Jan (Persian: بسارجان, also Romanized as Bosār Jān) is a village in Beyza Rural District, Beyza District, Sepidan County, Fars province, Iran. At the 2006 census, its population was 339, in 86 families.
