= Jariabad =

Jariabad جاري اباد
- Village
- Location within Iran
- Coordinates: 29°54′00″N 52°29′11″E
- Country: Iran
- Province: Fars
- County: Sepidan
- Bakhsh: Beyza
- Rural District: Kushk-e Hezar

Population (2006)
  - Total: 596
- Time zone: UTC+3:30 (IRST)
  - Summer (DST): UTC+4:30 (IRDT)

Jariabad (Persian: جاري اباد, also Romanized as Jārīābād) is a village in Kushk-e Hezar Rural District, Beyza District, Sepidan County, Fars province, Iran. At the 2006 census, its population was 596, in 131 families.
