= Saqqavan =

Saqqavan سقوان
- Village
- Location within Iran
- Coordinates: 30°04′08″N 52°23′53″E
- Country: Iran
- Province: Fars
- County: Sepidan
- Bakhsh: Beyza
- Rural District: Banesh

Population (2006)
  - Total: 280
- Time zone: UTC+3:30 (IRST)
  - Summer (DST): UTC+4:30 (IRDT)

Saqqavan (Persian: سقوان, also Romanized as Şaqqavān) is a village in Banesh Rural District, Beyza District, Sepidan County, Fars province, Iran. At the 2006 census, its population was 280, in 70 families.
