= Tang-e Tur =

Tang-e Tur تنگتور
- Village
- Location within Iran
- Coordinates: 30°06′39″N 52°20′08″E
- Country: Iran
- Province: Fars
- County: Sepidan
- Bakhsh: Beyza
- Rural District: Banesh

Population (2006)
  - Total: 452
- Time zone: UTC+3:30 (IRST)
  - Summer (DST): UTC+4:30 (IRDT)

Tang-e Tur (Persian: تنگتور, also Romanized as Tang-e Ţūr, Tang-e Tūr, and Tang-i-Tūr) is a village in Banesh Rural District, Beyza District, Sepidan County, Fars province, Iran. At the 2006 census, its population was 452, in 100 families.
