= Buzanjan-e Olya =

Buzanjan-e Olya بوزنجان عليا
- Village
- Location within Iran
- Coordinates: 30°06′30″N 52°14′01″E
- Country: Iran
- Province: Fars
- County: Sepidan
- Bakhsh: Beyza
- Rural District: Beyza

Population (2006)
  - Total: 105
- Time zone: UTC+3:30 (IRST)
  - Summer (DST): UTC+4:30 (IRDT)

Buzanjan-e Olya (Persian: بوزنجان عليا, also Romanized as Būzanjān-e 'Olyā; also known as Būzanjān) is a village in Beyza Rural District, Beyza District, Sepidan County, Fars province, Iran. At the 2006 census, its population was 105, in 29 families.
