= Siddiq (name) =

Siddiq or Siddique from the Arabic word صدّيق meaning "truthful") is an Islamic term and is given as an honorific title to certain individuals. The feminine gender for Siddiq is Siddiqah.

== People ==
=== Title ===
- Abu Bakr Siddiq (c. 573 – 634), the first Muslim Caliph following Prophet Muhammad's death. He ruled as khalifa 632 to 634
- Shah Siddiq (also rendered Siddik, Siddiky, Siddiqi, Siddiquee), 14th-century Sufi saint and one of the 360 auliyas or followers who accompanied Shah Jalal

=== Given name ===
- Siddiq Baloch (1940–2018), Pakistani journalist and senior political economist
- Siddiq Barmak (born 1962), Afghan film director and producer
- Siddiq Durimi (born 1988), Singaporean footballer
- Siddiq Ismail (born 1954) Pakistani Hamd and Na`at reciter
- Siddiq Khan (umpire), a Pakistani cricket umpire
- Siddiq Khan Kanju (died 2001), Pakistani politician and Minister of State for Foreign Affairs
- Siddiq Hasan Khan (1832–1890), celebrated and controversial leader of India's Muslim community in the 19th-century
- Siddiq Manzul (1932–2003), Sudanese footballer
- Siddique Salik (1935–1988), general in the Pakistan Army, combat artist, humorist, novelist, and a memoirist

Barrister Talat Siddiqui 1968 - present. Family and Immigration Lawyer. Solicitor, Barrister, Magistrate and High Court Advocate

=== Middle name ===
- Faiyaz Siddiq Koya, Fijian politician, Member of the Parliament of Fiji and government minister
- Mohamed Siddiq El-Minshawi (1920–1969), Egyptian Qur'anic reciter
- Mohammad Siddiq Chakari (born 1961), Afghan politician
- Muhammad Siddiq Khan (1910–1978), Bangladeshi academic and librarian
- Haji Mohammad Siddiq Choudri (1912–2004), Pakistani admiral in the Pakistan Navy

=== Surname ===
- Arfa Siddiq (born 1987), Pakistani politician and leader of the Pashtun Tahafuz Movement
- E. A. Siddiq full Ebrahimali Abubacker Siddiq (1937–2026), Indian agricultural scientist
- Ismail Siddiq (1830–1876), Egyptian politician
- Kashif Siddiq (born 1981), Pakistani cricketer
- Majdi Siddiq (born 1985), Qatari footballer of Sudanese descent
- Mohammad Siddiq Chakari (born 1961), Afghan cricketer
- Mohammad Siddiq (cricketer) (born 1979), Pakistani cricketer
- Mohammad Yusuf Siddiq (born 1957), Bangladeshi epigraphist
- Muhammad Siddique (born 1948), Pakistani middle-distance runner
- Suhaila Siddiq (1949–2020), Afghan politician
- Syed Muhammed Siddique, Bengali politician
- Tulip Siddiq (born 1982), British Labour Party politician
- Umar Siddiq (born 1992), Pakistani cricketer

== Fiction ==
- Siddiq (The Walking Dead), a fictional character from the comic book series The Walking Dead and the television series of the same name

== See also ==
- Sadek (disambiguation)
- Sadeq (disambiguation)
- Sadiq (disambiguation)
- Sadegh (disambiguation)
- Siddique (disambiguation)
