= Qabaleh =

Qabaleh (Persian: قباله) may refer to:

- Qabaleh, Ardabil
- Qabaleh, Fars
- Qabaleh-ye Firuzi, Fars Province
