= Chah Chah =

Chah Chah چاه چاه
- Village
- Location within Iran
- Coordinates: 30°01′06″N 52°23′02″E
- Country: Iran
- Province: Fars
- County: Sepidan
- Bakhsh: Beyza
- Rural District: Beyza

Population (2006)
  - Total: 43
- Time zone: UTC+3:30 (IRST)
  - Summer (DST): UTC+4:30 (IRDT)

Chah Chah (Persian: چاه چاه, also Romanized as Chāh Chāh) is a village in Beyza Rural District, Beyza District, Sepidan County, Fars province, Iran. At the 2006 census, its population was 43, in 9 families.
