= Takhteh Sang =

Takhteh Sang (Persian: تخته‌سنگ), also rendered as Takht-e Sang or Takht-i-Sang, may refer to:

- Takhteh Sang-e Olya
- Takhteh Sang-e Sofla
