= Buzanjan-e Sofla =

Buzanjan-e Sofla بوزنجان سفلي
- Village
- Location within Iran
- Coordinates: 30°05′02″N 52°17′19″E
- Country: Iran
- Province: Fars
- County: Sepidan
- Bakhsh: Beyza
- Rural District: Beyza

Population (2006)
  - Total: 81
- Time zone: UTC+3:30 (IRST)
  - Summer (DST): UTC+4:30 (IRDT)

Buzanjan-e Sofla (Persian: بوزنجان سفلي, also Romanized as Būzanjān-e Soflá; also known as Būrenjān) is a village in Beyza Rural District, Beyza District, Sepidan County, Fars province, Iran. At the 2006 census, its population was 81, in 18 families.
