= Qasr-e Molla =

Qasr-e Molla قصرملا
- Village
- Location within Iran
- Coordinates: 30°01′30″N 52°24′17″E
- Country: Iran
- Province: Fars
- County: Sepidan
- Bakhsh: Beyza
- Rural District: Beyza

Population (2006)
  - Total: 191
- Time zone: UTC+3:30 (IRST)
  - Summer (DST): UTC+4:30 (IRDT)

Qasr-e Molla (Persian: قصرملا, also Romanized as Qaşr-e Mollā) is a village in Beyza Rural District, Beyza District, Sepidan County, Fars province, Iran. At the 2006 census, its population was 191, in 47 families.
