= Sadik (disambiguation) =

Sadik is an Arabic masculine given name. It may also refer to:

- Sadik (surname), list of people with the surname
- Sadik (comics), an Italian crime comic book series
- Sadik 2, a 2013 French horror movie
