= List of earthquakes in 1987 =

Earthquakes in 1987
Approximate epicenters of the earthquakes in 1987
- 4.0–5.9 magnitude
- 6.0–6.9 magnitude
- 7.0–7.9 magnitude
- 8.0+ magnitude
- Strongest magnitude: 7.9 M_{w} United States
- Deadliest: 7.1 M_{w} (Ecuador) Ecuador; 1,000 deaths
- Total fatalities: 1,090

Number by magnitude
- 9.0+: 0

This is a list of earthquakes in 1987. Only earthquakes of magnitude 6 or above are included, unless they result in damage or casualties, or are notable for some other reason. All dates are listed according to UTC time.

== By death toll ==
Rank	Magnitude	Deaths	Location	MMI	Depth (km)	Date
1	7.1	1,000	Ecuador, Napo	IX (Violent)	10.0	March 6
2	6.7	37	Indonesia, East Nusa Tenggara	VII (Very strong)	33.0	November 26

== By magnitude ==
Rank	Magnitude	Deaths	Location	Max Intensity	Depth (km)	Date (MM-DD)
1	7.9	0	United States, Alaska offshore	VI (Strong)	10.0	November 30
2	7.6	1	Chile, Antofagasta	VI (Strong)	62.3	March 5
2	7.4	0	Papua New Guinea, West New Britain offshore	VIII (Severe)	47.8	October 16
2	7.4	0	Australia, Macquarie Island offshore	I (Not felt)	33.0	September 3
2	7.4	3	Papua New Guinea, Morobe offshore	VII (Very strong)	54.9	February 8
6	7.3	0	Tonga, Vava'u offshore	IV (Light)	16.0	October 6
7	7.2	5	Chile, Tarapacá	VII (Very strong)	69.7	September 8
7	7.2	1,000	Ecuador, Napo	IX (Violent)	10.0	March 6
9	7.1	0	Indonesia, Banda Sea offshore	V (Moderate)	67.3	June 17
10	7.0	0	Papua New Guinea, Bougainville offshore	V (Moderate)	24.7	October 12
10	7.0	0	Argentina, Jujuy	IV (Light)	248.7	April 1
10	7.0	0	Chile, Antofagasta offshore	IV (Light)	34.8	March 5
10	7.0	0	South Georgia and the South Sandwich Islands, South Sandwich Islands offshore	I (Not felt)	47.6	January 30

== By month ==
=== January ===
January
- Strongest magnitude: 7.0 M_{w} South Georgia and the South Sandwich Islands
- Deadliest: 4.2 M_{w} Italy; 2 deaths
- Total fatalities: 3

Number by magnitude
- 8.0–8.9: 0
- 7.0–7.9: 1
- 6.0–6.9: 12

Date	Country and location	M_{w}	Depth (km)	MMI	Notes	Casualties	
Date	Country and location	M_{w}	Depth (km)	MMI	Notes	Dead	Injured
2	Egypt, Ismailia	5.0	24.1	V	Minor damage occurred in Ismailia.	-	-
3	Papua New Guinea, Bismarck Sea offshore	6.2	5.0	I	This two similarly sized earthquakes occurring an hour apart can be considered a doublet earthquake.	-	-
3	Papua New Guinea, Bismarck Sea offshore	6.3	5.0	I	This two similarly sized earthquakes occurring an hour apart can be considered a doublet earthquake.	-	-
3	Vanuatu, Sanma	6.7	14.5	VII	-	-	-
4	Panama, Chiriquí offshore	6.3	10.0	I	-	-	-
5	United States, Alaska offshore	6.8	33.0	V	-	-	-
5	China, Xinjiang	5.7	16.5	VII	Several people were injured and damage occurred in Baicheng.	-	Several
7	Albania, Korçë	5.0	13.5	VI	Damage occurred in Ersekë and Gostivisht.	-	-
9	Japan, Iwate	6.6	66.7	VI	Minor damage occurred in Morioka and Ōfunato.	-	-
9	Tonga, Tongatapu offshore	6.5	33.0	I	-	-	-
11	Iran, Fars	4.9	9.7	VI	300 houses were damaged in Doshman Ziari.	-	-
13	Colombia, Chocó offshore	6.0	10.0	II	-	-	-
13	southern East Pacific Rise	6.0	10.0	I	-	-	-
14	Japan, Hokkaido	6.8	102.0	VI	Six people were injured.	-	6
15	El Salvador, La Libertad	4.0	10.0	IV	This is an aftershock of the 1986 San Salvador earthquake. Additional damage was caused, with many structures previously damaged by the October event collapsed.	-	-
22	Italy, Tuscany offshore	4.2	21.6	IV	Two people died of heart attacks.	2	-
24	China, Xinjiang	6.2	28.9	VII	417 houses were damaged in Wushi.	-	-
26	Algeria, Chlef	4.9	10.0	VI	One person was killed, another seven were injured, and 629 houses were damaged in Mohammadia.	1	7
30	South Georgia and the South Sandwich Islands, South Sandwich Islands offshore	7.0	47.6	I	-	-	-

=== February ===
February
- Strongest magnitude: 7.4 M_{w} Papua New Guinea
- Deadliest: 7.4 M_{w} Papua New Guinea; 3 deaths
- Total fatalities: 3

Number by magnitude
- 8.0–8.9: 0
- 7.0–7.9: 1
- 6.0–6.9: 18

Date	Country and location	M_{w}	Depth (km)	MMI	Notes	Casualties	
Date	Country and location	M_{w}	Depth (km)	MMI	Notes	Dead	Injured
6	Japan, Fukushima offshore	6.4	35.6	IV	It is a foreshock of the 6.8 quake an hour later.	-	-
6	Japan, Fukushima offshore	6.8	47.7	V	Small tsunamis were observed, the largest having 12 cm at Onahama.	-	-
7	Papua New Guinea, Morobe offshore	6.2	27.4	VI	It is a foreshock of the 7.4 event two days later.	-	-
