= Takhteh Sang-e Sofla =

Takhteh Sang-e Sofla تخته‌سنگ سفلی
- Village
- Location within Iran
- Coordinates: 30°05′04″N 52°27′44″E
- Country: Iran
- Province: Fars
- County: Sepidan
- Bakhsh: Beyza
- Rural District: Banesh

Population (2006)
  - Total: 228
- Time zone: UTC+3:30 (IRST)
  - Summer (DST): UTC+4:30 (IRDT)

Takhteh Sang-e Sofla (Persian: تخته‌سنگ سفلی, also Romanized as Takhteh Sang-e Soflá) is a village in Banesh Rural District, Beyza District, Sepidan County, Fars province, Iran. At the 2006 census, its population was 228, in 56 families.
