= Qabaleh-ye Firuzi =

Qabaleh-ye Firuzi قباله فيروزي
- Village
- Location within Iran
- Coordinates: 30°04′28″N 52°25′42″E
- Country: Iran
- Province: Fars
- County: Sepidan
- Bakhsh: Beyza
- Rural District: Banesh

Population (2006)
  - Total: 153
- Time zone: UTC+3:30 (IRST)
  - Summer (DST): UTC+4:30 (IRDT)

Qabaleh-ye Firuzi (Persian: قباله فيروزي, also Romanized as Qabāleh-ye Fīrūzī and Qabālehfīrūzī) is a village in Banesh Rural District, Beyza District, Sepidan County, Fars province, Iran. At the 2006 census, its population was 153, in 38 families.
