= Sadykhov =

Sadykhov, Sadikhov, Sadigov or Sadiqov (Azerbaijani: Sadıqov or Sadıxov, Russian: Садыхов) is an Azerbaijani or post-Soviet (Bashkortostan, Kazakhstan, Kyrgyzstan, Chuvashia, Dagestan, Tatarstan, Uzbekistan etc.) masculine surname; its feminine counterpart is Sadykhova, Sadikhova, Sadigova or Sadiqova. It is slavicized from the Arabic masculine name Sadiq. It may refer to:

== Sadigov ==
- Aminaga Sadigov (born 1962), Azerbaijani scientist
- Huseynagha Sadigov (born 1940), Azerbaijani politician
- Huseynagha Sadigov (actor) (1914–1983) Soviet actor
- Madina Sadigova, Azerbaijani karateka
- Najmaddin Sadigov (born 1956), Chief of General Staff of Azerbaijani Armed Forces
- Nuraddin Sadigov (1935–2009), Chief of General Staff of Azerbaijani Armed Forces

== Sadikhov ==
- Oleg Sadikhov (born 1966), Israeli weightlifter

== Sadykhov ==
- Chingiz Sadykhov (1929–2017), Azerbaijani pianist
- Ragim Sadykhov (born 1996), Russian football player
- Yusif Sadykhov (1918–1971), Azerbaijani Red Army soldier

== Sadykov ==
- Aizat Sadykov (born 1993), Russian football player
- Aydos Sadykov (born 1968), Kazakhstani journalist, opposition figure
- Sagdat Sadykov (born 1973), Kazakhstani judoka

== Sadikova ==
- Salamat Sadikova (born 1956), Kyrgyz folk singer
- Sara Sadíqova (1906–1986), Tatar actress, singer and composer

== See also ==
- Sadykovo, a suburban village in the Kalininsky District, Tver Oblast.
