= Sadeqabad, Sepidan =

Sadeqabad صادق اباد
- Village
- Location within Iran
- Coordinates: 29°56′16″N 52°27′24″E
- Country: Iran
- Province: Fars
- County: Sepidan
- Bakhsh: Beyza
- Rural District: Kushk-e Hezar

Population (2006)
  - Total: 364
- Time zone: UTC+3:30 (IRST)
  - Summer (DST): UTC+4:30 (IRDT)

Sadeqabad (Persian: صادق اباد, also Romanized as Şādeqābād; also known as Sadiqābād) is a village in Kushk-e Hezar Rural District, Beyza District, Sepidan County, Fars province, Iran. At the 2006 census, its population was 364, in 82 families.
