= Sadeq =

Sadeq is a masculine given name of Arabic origin. It is most commonly used in Iran, Pakistan, and Arab countries. It is the adjective form of the root word [صدق] which means truthfulness, and generally means truthful. Notable people with the name include:

== Given name ==
- Sadeq Ali (died 1862), Bengali writer, poet, and judge
- Sadeq Amani (1930–1965), Iranian political activist
- Sadequl Arefin, Bangladeshi academic
- Sadeq Chubak (1916–1998), sometimes Sādegh Choubak (1916–1998), Iranian author
- Sadeq Ganji (1963–1990), Iranian diplomat
- Sadeq Khalilian (born 1959), Iranian economist, academic, politician, and government minister
- Sadeq Khan, a Faujdar of the Mughal Bengal's Sylhet Sarkar
- Sadeq Mohammad Khan IV (1861–1899), 10th Nawab of Bahawalpur
- Sadeq Kia (1920–2002), Iranian man of letters and professor of Iranian languages
- Sadeq Mallallah (1970–1992), Saudi prisoner executed for apostasy
- Sadeq Naihoum (1937–1994), Libyan writer and journalist
- Sadeq Khan Qajar, Iranian military commander
- Sadeq Amin Abu Rass (born 1952), Yemeni politician
- Sadeq Rohani (1926–2022), Iranian Twelver Shia Marja
- Sadeq Sayeed (born 1953), Pakistani banker and businessman
- Sadeq Khan Shaqaqi (died 1800), chief of the Shaqaqi tribe and khan of Sarab
- Sadeq Tabatabaei (1943–2015), Iranian writer, journalist, TV host, and university professor
- Sadeq Khan Zand (died 1781), also known as Mohammad Sadeq, the fifth Shah of the Zand dynasty

== Middle name ==
- Ahmed Sadeq Al Khamri (born 1992), Yemeni footballer
- Ali Sadeq Benwan (born 1991), Iraqi footballer
- Mohammad Mohammad Sadeq al-Sadr (1943–1999), Iraqi Twelver Shi'a cleric of the rank of Grand Ayatollah

== Surname ==
- Hamed Sadeq (born 1971), Kuwaiti sprinter
- Moain Sadeq (born 1955), Palestinian archaeologist

== Places ==
- Sadeq, Iran, Sadeq (Persian: صادق, also Romanized as Şādeq) is a village in Ahudasht Rural District, Shavur District, Shush County, Khuzestan Province, Iran.

== See also ==
- Sadegh (disambiguation)
- Sadek (disambiguation)
- Sadiq (disambiguation)
- Siddiq (name)
- Siddique (disambiguation)
