= Sedik =

Sedik is a surname. Notable people with the surname include:

- Ahmad Sedik (born 1983), Egyptian footballer
- Mohamed Sedik (born 1978), Egyptian footballer
- Muudea Sedik (2000–2024), Ethiopian-Canadian YouTuber and live-streamer, known as Twomad

== See also ==
- Sadik
