= Haftjan =

Haftjan هفت جان
- Village
- Location within Iran
- Coordinates: 30°04′28″N 52°25′43″E
- Country: Iran
- Province: Fars
- County: Sepidan
- Bakhsh: Beyza
- Rural District: Banesh

Population (2006)
  - Total: 205
- Time zone: UTC+3:30 (IRST)
  - Summer (DST): UTC+4:30 (IRDT)

Haftjan (Persian: هفت جان, also Romanized as Haftjān; also known as Haftenjān, Haftījān, Haftinjān, Kavalah, and Qabāleh) is a village in Banesh Rural District, Beyza District, Sepidan County, Fars province, Iran. At the 2006 census, its population was 205, in 50 families.
