= Haftkhan Rural District =

Rural district in Fars province, Iran

Haftkhan Rural District Persian: دهستان هفتخان
- Rural District
- Location within Iran
- Coordinates: 30°04′42″N 52°20′59″E
- Country: Iran
- Province: Fars
- County: Beyza
- District: Banesh
- Capital: Doshman Ziari
- Time zone: UTC+3:30 (IRST)

Haftkhan Rural District (Persian: دهستان هفتخان) is in Banesh District of Beyza County, Fars province, Iran. Its capital is the village of Doshman Ziari, whose population at the time of the 2016 National Census was 1,777 in 501 households.

== History ==
In 2019, Beyza District was separated from Sepidan County in the establishment of Beyza County, and Haftkhan Rural District was created in the new Banesh District.
