= Takhteh Sang-e Olya =

Takhteh Sang-e Olya تخته‌سنگ علیا
- Village
- Location within Iran
- Coordinates: 30°04′54″N 52°27′30″E
- Country: Iran
- Province: Fars
- County: Sepidan
- Bakhsh: Beyza
- Rural District: Banesh

Population (2006)
  - Total: 283
- Time zone: UTC+3:30 (IRST)
  - Summer (DST): UTC+4:30 (IRDT)

Takhteh Sang-e Olya (Persian: تخته‌سنگ علیا, also Romanized as Takhteh Sang-e 'Olyā; also known as Takhteh Sang, Takht-e Sang, and Takht-i-Sang) is a village in Banesh Rural District, Beyza District, Sepidan County, Fars province, Iran. At the 2006 census, its population was 283, in 54 families.
