= Aliabad-e Sartol =

Aliabad-e Sartol or Aliabad-e Sar Tol (Persian: علي ابادسرتل) may refer to:

- Aliabad-e Sar Tol, Fars
- Aliabad-e Sartol, Kohgiluyeh and Boyer-Ahmad
