= Koushalam =

- Directed by: T. S. Mohan
- Written by: T. S. Mohan, Benny P. Nayarambalam
- Screenplay by: V. R. Gopalakrishnan
- Produced by: T. S. Mohan
- Starring: Siddique; Urvashi
- Edited by: G. Murali
- Music by: Raveendran
- Distributed by: Palamuttam Films Release
- Release date: 1993
- Country: India
- Language: Malayalam

Koushalam is a 1993 Indian Malayalam film, directed by T. S. Mohan and starring Siddique and Urvashi in the lead roles.

== Cast ==
- Siddique as SI Gopinathan
- Urvashi as Advocate Maya Devi
- Shwetha Menon as Shashikala
- Sainudeen as Mathunni
- Prathapachandran as College Principal
- Janardhanan as Chackochan
- Kundara Johnny as CI Thomas Mathew
- KPAC Sunny as Commissioner
- Kuthiravattam Pappu as MLA K.S. Pilla
- Philomina as Mariya Chedathi
- Thrissur Elsy as Hostel Warden
- Zeenath as Rosy
- Santhakumari as Gopi's mother
- Mala Aravindan as Priest
- Sathaar as Adv. Shashikumar
- Mafia Sasi as Victor Solomon
- Bindu Varappuzha as Gracy
- Biyon as Kittu (child artist)
- Bheeman Raghu – Cameo Appearance

== Soundtrack ==
- "Nilaavin" – K. S. Chithra
- "Innoraayiram" – K. S. Chithra, Sujatha Mohan, Minmini
- "Kinavin" – K. J. Yesudas

== Trivia ==
Originally, actor Jayaram was cast as the hero in Koushalam, Jayaram avoided this role, so Sidique become the hero in the movie.
