= Banesh District =

District in Fars province, Iran

Banesh District Persian: بخش بانش
- District
- Location within Iran
- Coordinates: 30°04′42″N 52°22′44″E
- Country: Iran
- Province: Fars
- County: Beyza
- Capital: Banesh
- Time zone: UTC+3:30 (IRST)

Banesh District (Persian: بخش بانش) is in Beyza County, Fars province, Iran. Its capital is the village of Banesh, whose population at the time of the 2016 National Census was 2,873 in 851 households.

== History ==
In 2019, Beyza District was separated from Sepidan County in the establishment of Beyza County, which was divided into two districts of two rural districts each, with Beyza as its capital and only city.

== Demographics ==
=== Administrative divisions ===
Banesh District
Administrative Divisions
Banesh RD
Haftkhan RD
RD = Rural District
