= Sadique =

Sadique a variant of Sadik is a given name and surname. It may refer to:

== Given name ==
- Sadique Abubakar (born 1960), Nigerian Air Marshal and Chief of Air Staff of the Nigerian Airforce
- Sadique Henry (born 1994), West Indian cricketer
- Sadique Khan Kanju or Siddiq Khan Kanju (died 2001), Pakistani politician and Minister of State for Foreign Affairs
- Sadique Mohammed (born 1938), West Indian cricket umpire

== Surname ==
- Halimah Mohamed Sadique (born 1962), Malaysian politician and Member of Parliament
- Ismat Ara Sadique (1941–2020), Bangladeshi politician and minister
- Muhammad Sadiq (disambiguation), multiple people
- Shibli Sadique, Bangladeshi politician and Member of Parliament
