= Maria Orłowska =

Polish computer scientist (born 1951)

Maria Elżbieta Orłowska FAA (born 1951 in Warsaw) is a Polish computer scientist, academic and bureaucrat. She specializes in database systems, integration and performance problems of large systems. She is the author of numerous scientific publications in the international specialized press. She is the author or co-author of patents, including solutions for secure transactions in the economic process. She was Secretary of State to the Polish Ministry of Science and Higher Education for over six years.

== Education and academic career ==
She graduated in 1974 from the Faculty of Mathematics and Mechanics, University of Warsaw. In 1981 she obtained a doctorate at the University of Warsaw. In 2003, she received a DSc from the University of Queensland. Habilitation in 2004 at the Institute of Computer Science. On February 11, 2009, she received the title of professor of technical sciences.

From 1988 to 2007 she worked in computer science at the University of Queensland, where she was promoted to professor in the Faculty of Science in 1990. In 1995 she was appointed director of the Distributed Systems Technology Centre (National Centre for Research in the Field of Distributed Systems). In 2003, she was elected a fellow of the Australian Academy of Science. In 2007 she returned to Poland, where she was appointed professor at the Polish-Japanese Institute of Information Technology in Warsaw. She accepted a Doctor Honoris Cousa from the University of Queensland in July 2013.

She has supervised more than 32 PhD students. One of whom, is computer scientist Shazia Sadiq.

== Career in government ==
On January 1, 2008, she was appointed Secretary of State to the Polish Ministry of Science and Higher Education. On February 1, 2012, she resigned this post, and was subsequently appointed Secretary of State in the Ministry of Finance . She held this position briefly before being reappointed as the Secretary of State to the Ministry of Science and Higher Education on May 28, 2012. She resigned from the position on December 4, 2013.
