= Sidique =

Sidique is a surname. Notable persons with that name include:

- Sidique Mansaray (born 1980), Sierra Leonean footballer
- Sidique Mussagi (born 1993), Mozambican footballer
- Sidique Ali Merican (1930–2009), Malaysian sprinter
- Mohammad Sidique Khan (1974–2005), Suicide bomber

== See also ==
- Siddique (disambiguation)
