= Rabbani (Sufism) =

In Sufism, a rabbani (Arabic: رَبَّانِيّ; 'Godly person'), or ribbi, is a wasil who is attached to Allah.

== Presentation ==
The term rabbani or ribbi is cited in the Quran in several Āyāt, as:

- Surate Al Imran, Āyah: 79.
مَا كَانَ لِبَشَرٍ أَنْ يُؤْتِيَهُ اللّهُ الْكِتَابَ وَالْحُكْمَ وَالنُّبُوَّةَ ثُمَّ يَقُولَ لِلنَّاسِ كُونُواْ عِبَادًا لِّي مِنْ دُونِ اللّهِ وَلَـكِنْ كُونُواْ رَبَّانِيِّينَ بِمَا كُنْتُمْ تُعَلِّمُونَ الْكِتَابَ وَبِمَا كُنْتُمْ تَدْرُسُونَ

English: It does not behoove any human that Allah should give him the Book, judgement and prophethood, and then he should say to the people, ‘Be my servants instead of Allah.’ Rather [he would say], ‘Be a godly people, because of your teaching the Book and because of your studying it.
(Quran: 3:79)

- Surate Al Imran, Āyah: 146.
وَكَأَيِّنْ مِنْ نَبِيٍّ قَاتَلَ مَعَهُ رِبِّيُّونَ كَثِيرٌ فَمَا وَهَنُوا لِمَا أَصَابَهُمْ فِي سَبِيلِ اللَّهِ وَمَا ضَعُفُوا وَمَا اسْتَكَانُوا ۗ وَاللَّهُ يُحِبُّ الصَّابِرِينَ

English: How many a prophet there has been with whom a multitude of godly men fought. They did not falter for what befell them in the way of Allah, neither did they weaken, nor did they abase themselves; and Allah loves the steadfast.
(Quran: 3:146)

- Surate Al-Ma'idah, Āyah: 44.
إِنَّا أَنْزَلْنَا التَّوْرَاةَ فِيهَا هُدًى وَنُورٌ ۚ يَحْكُمُ بِهَا النَّبِيُّونَ الَّذِينَ أَسْلَمُوا لِلَّذِينَ هَادُوا وَالرَّبَّانِيُّونَ وَالأَحْبَارُ بِمَا اسْتُحْفِظُوا مِنْ كِتَابِ اللَّهِ وَكَانُوا عَلَيْهِ شُهَدَاءَ

English: We sent down the Torah containing guidance and light. The prophets, who had submitted, judged by it for the Jews, and so did the godly people and the scribes, as they were charged to preserve the Book of Allah and were witnesses to it.
(Quran: 5:44)

- Surate Al-Ma'idah, Āyah: 63.
لَوْلَا يَنْهَاهُمُ الرَّبَّانِيُّونَ وَالْأَحْبَارُ عَنْ قَوْلِهِمُ الْإِثْمَ وَأَكْلِهِمُ السُّحْتَ ۚ لَبِئْسَ مَا كَانُوا يَصْنَعُونَ

English: Why do not the godly people and the scribes forbid them from sinful speech and consuming illicit gains? Surely, evil is what they have been working.
(Quran: 5:63)

== Characteristics ==
The rabbani has several characteristics mentioned by the Quran, as:

- Learning the Book (Arabic: بِمَا كُنتُمْ تَعْلَمُونَ الْكِتَابَ) in Warsh recitation.
- Teaching the Book (Arabic: بِمَا كُنتُمْ تُعَلِّمُونَ الْكِتَابَ) in Hafs recitation.
- Studying the Book and other sciences (Arabic: وَبِمَا كُنتُمْ تَدْرُسُونَ).
- Supporting the Religion (Arabic: وَكَأَيِّن مِن نَبِيٍّ قاتَلَ مَعَهُ رِبِّيّونَ كَثيرٌ).
- Sabr when facing Ibtila'e (Arabic: فَما وَهَنوا لِما أَصابَهُم في سَبيلِ اللَّهِ وَما ضَعُفوا وَمَا استَكانوا ۗ وَاللَّهُ يُحِبُّ الصّابِرينَ).
- Application of the jurisprudence (Arabic: إِنّا أَنزَلنَا التَّوراةَ فيها هُدًى وَنورٌ ۚ يَحكُمُ بِهَا النَّبِيّونَ الَّذينَ أَسلَموا لِلَّذينَ هادوا وَالرَّبّانِيّونَ وَالأَحبارُ).
- Preserving the authenticity of the Book of Allah (Arabic: بِمَا استُحفِظوا مِن كِتابِ اللَّهِ).
- Revealing and witnessing the religion (Arabic: وَكانوا عَلَيهِ شُهَداءَ).
- Forbidding sinful speech (Arabic: لَولا يَنهاهُمُ الرَّبّانِيّونَ وَالأَحبارُ عَن قَولِهِمُ الإِثمَ).
- Forbidding consuming illicit gains (Arabic: وَأَكلِهِمُ السُّحتَ).

== See also ==
- Islamic holy books
- Talibe
- Murid
- Salik
- Wasil
- Siddiq
