= Sadek =

Sadek may refer to:

== Places ==
=== Czech Republic ===
- Sádek (Příbram District), a municipality and village in the Central Bohemian Region
- Sádek (Svitavy District), a municipality and village in the Pardubice Region
- Sádek, a village and part of Deštnice in the Ústí nad Labem Region
- Sádek, a village and part of Velké Heraltice in the Moravian-Silesian Region

=== Poland ===
- Sadek, Lesser Poland Voivodeship
- Sadek, Ciechanów County, Masovian Voivodeship
- Sadek, Szydłowiec County, Masovian Voivodeship
- Sadek, Podlaskie Voivodeship
- Sadek, Świętokrzyskie Voivodeship

== People ==
=== First name ===
- Sadek Boukhalfa (1934–2009), Algerian international footballer
- Sadek Hadjeres (1928–2022), Algerian communist
- Sadek Hilal (1931–2001), Egyptian-American radiologist
- Sadek Wahba (born 1965), American economist

=== Surname ===
- Andrew Sadek (1993–2014), American student-turned-drug informant who may have been murdered
- Mike Sadek (1946–2021), American baseball player
- Mohammed Ahmed Sadek (1917–1991), Egyptian general and former defense minister
- Narriman Sadek (1933–2005), wife of King Farouk of Egypt
- Pierre Sadek (1938–2013), Lebanese caricaturist

=== Stage name ===
- Sadek (rapper), French rapper Sadek Bourguiba (born 1991)

== See also ==
- Sadeq (disambiguation)
- Sadeque
- Sadiq (disambiguation)
- Sadegh (disambiguation)
- Siddiq (name)
- Siddique (disambiguation)
