= Sadiq Abad, Bajaur =

Coordinates: 34°44′N 71°28′E

Sadiq Abad
- Town
- Location in Pakistan Sadiq Abad (Pakistan)
- Country: Pakistan
- Region: Khyber Pakhtunkhwa
- District: Bajaur
- Tehsil: Khar Bajaur

Population (2017)
  - Total: 10,060
- Time zone: UTC+5 (PST)
  - Summer (DST): UTC+6 (PDT)

Sadiq Abad is a settlement in Khar Bajaur Tehsil, Bajur, Khyber Pakhtunkhwa, Pakistan. The population is 10,060 according to the 2017 census.
