= Sadeqabad, Takestan =

Sadeqabad صادق اباد
- Village
- Location within Iran
- Coordinates: 35°50′55″N 49°26′36″E
- Country: Iran
- Province: Qazvin
- County: Takestan
- Bakhsh: Ziaabad
- Rural District: Dodangeh-ye Sofla

Population (2006)
  - Total: 167
- Time zone: UTC+3:30 (IRST)
  - Summer (DST): UTC+4:30 (IRDT)

Sadeqabad (Persian: صادق اباد, also Romanized as Şādeqābād, Sadegh Abad, and Sādīqābād) is a village in Dodangeh-ye Sofla Rural District, Ziaabad District, Takestan County, Qazvin Province, Iran. At the 2006 census, its population was 167, in 47 families.
