= Sara Sadíqova =

Tatar singer (1906–1986)

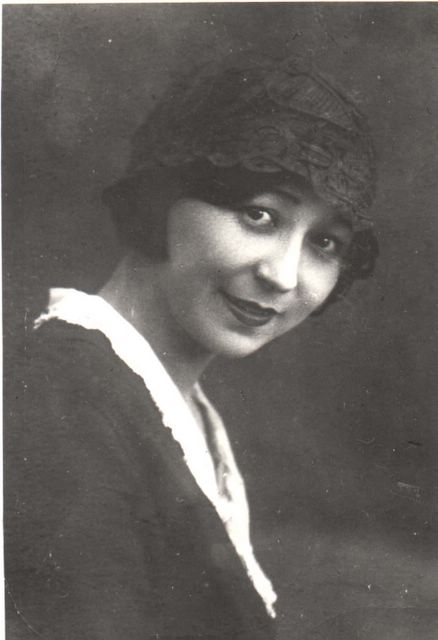
Sara Sadíqova whilst a student of Moscow Conservatory in 1924

Sadíqova Sara Ğarif qızı (pronounced [sʌˈdɯɪqəvɑ sʌˈrɑ ɣæˈrif qɯˈzɯ]) aka Sara Sadíqova (Sadıyqova); Tatar Cyrillic: Садыйкова Сара Гариф кызы; Russian: Сады́кова Сара́ Гари́фовна; 1 November 1906 – 7 June 1986) was an actress, singer (soprano), and composer. From 1938 to 1948, she was a soloist of Musa Cälil Tatar Opera and Ballet Theatre. Sara performed parts in operas and musical comedies including Saniä, Qaçqın (Runaway), Ğäliäbanu, Başmağım (My Slippers), İldar, and musical dramas On Qandır, The Employer. She is the author of many songs and musical comedies, including Mäxäbbät cırı (The Song of Love) (1971), and Kiäwlär (Sons-in-law) (1972) in collaboration with R. Ğöbäydullin. Sadíqova was awarded the Ğabdulla Tuqay Tatar ASSR State Prize in 1990, after her death.

== Biography ==
She was born as Bibisara Sadíqova on November 1, 1906, in Kazan, Russian Empire. She graduated from a famous school for girls and entered a teachers' training college.

In 1921 Bibisara performed her first part in the musical charity performance Buydaq (The Bachelor). One of the college's teachers, Tatar composer Soltan Ğäbäşi, sent her to the Moscow Conservatory, where she studied from 1922 to 1928. In 1930–1934, Sara Sadíqova worked in the troupe of the Tatar Academic Theater. She performed one of the first Tatar operas, Eşçe (The Worker), in the 1930s. In 1934–1938, she worked at the Tatar Opera Studio within the Moscow Conservatory.

In 1942, Sara started to compose songs, creating the tango The Expectation on lyrics by A. Yerikeyev. Her favorite styles were the tango and foxtrot. She composed more than 400 popular songs as well as music for 30 plays.

Sara Sadíqova died on 7 June 1986 and was buried at the Memorial Yaña-Tatar Bistäse (Novotatarskoye) cemetery.

== Honours and awards ==
In 1939, she was first awarded with the title of Honoured Artist of the Tatar ASSR, and then in 1977 she became a People's Artist of the Tatar ASSR. She was awarded the wider Honoured Worker of Culture of the Russian SFSR in 1984.

== See also ==
- Salamat Sadikova

== References and notes ==
- "Sara Sadíqova/Сара Садыйкова". Tatar Encyclopaedia (in Tatar). Kazan: The Republic of Tatarstan Academy of Sciences. Institution of the Tatar Encyclopaedia. 2002.
