= Shazia Sadiq =

Australian computer scientist

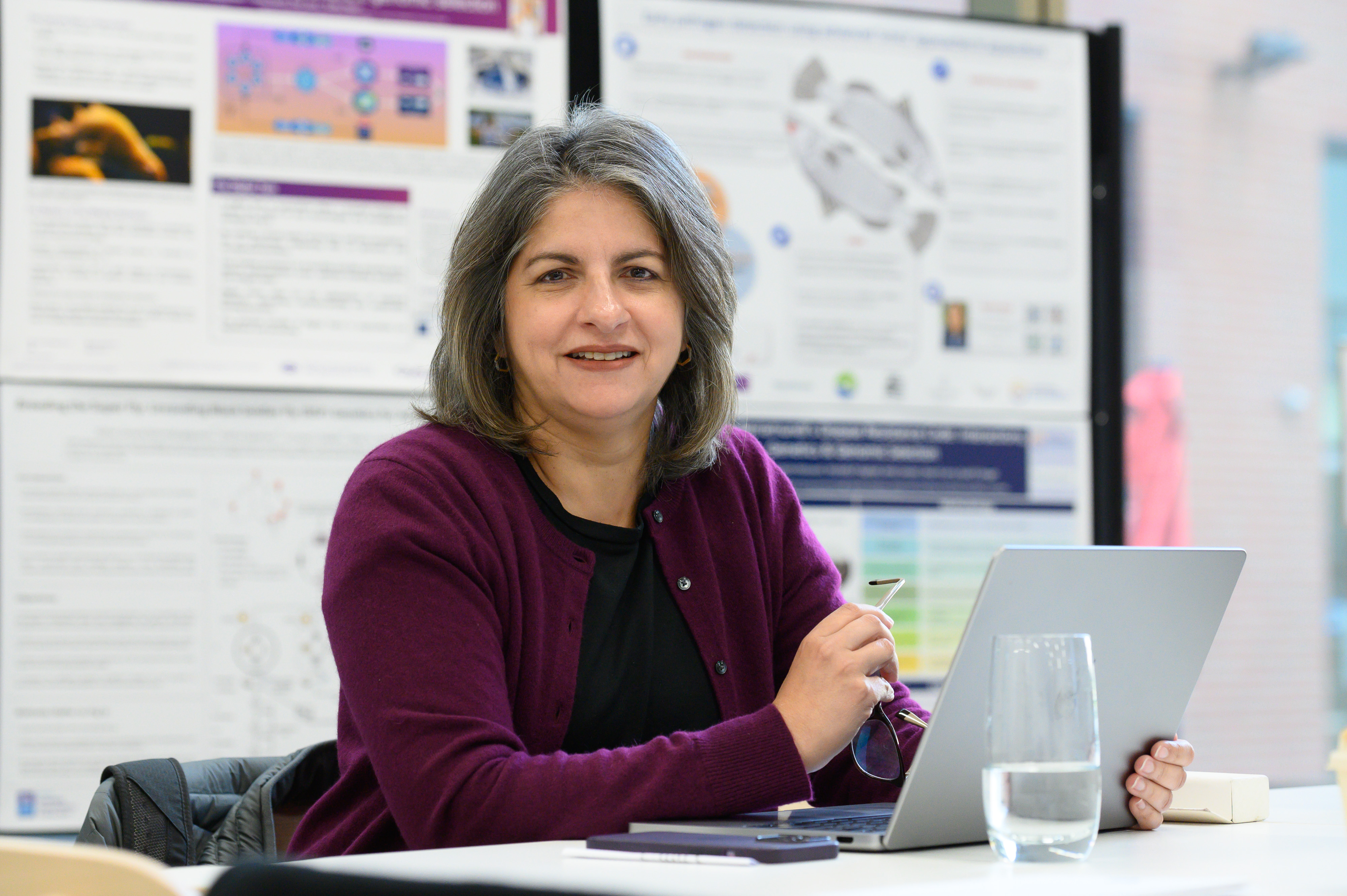
Shazia Sadiq in 2023

Shazia Sadiq is an Australian computer scientist and academic. She is a Professor of Computer Science at the University of Queensland.

== Background ==
Originally from Pakistan, Sadiq was one of a handful of women to undertake studies in a computer science program within Pakistan at Quaid-i-Azam University, Islamabad, Pakistan in 1980s, and wrote her first computer program in Fortran using punched cards.

She later received a NORAD scholarship to undertake a masters in computer science from the Asian Institute of Technology, Bangkok, Thailand. She then went on to do a PhD in Information Systems at the University of Queensland, Brisbane Australia, with Professor Maria Orlowska.

Since 2001, Sadiq has been based in the School of Information Technology and Electrical Engineering, at the University of Queensland. She conducts research and teaching in databases and information systems.

She serves as deputy chair on the Australian Academy of Science's National Committee on Information and Communication Sciences and formerly as vice president of the Asia Pacific Chapter of IQ International – the International Association of Information and Data Quality.

== Education ==
- Doctor of Philosophy (The University of Queensland, Brisbane, Australia, 2002)
- Masters in Computer Science (Asian Institute of Technology, Bangkok, Thailand, 1993)
- Masters in Computer Science (Quaid-i-Azam University, Islamabad, Pakistan, 1989)

== Awards ==
- Women in Technology Award for InfoTech Research 2012
- The University of Queensland Award for Teaching Excellence 2012
- Fellow of the Australian Academy of Technology and Engineering 2020
