= Salamat Sadikova =

- Also known as: Саламат Садыкова
- Born: September 28, 1956 (age 69)
- Origin: Kyzyl Jol, Batken, Kyrgyzstan
- Genres: Kyrgyz folk, ethnic music
- Occupations: musician, songwriter, singer
- Instrument: komuz
- Label: Kyrgyz Music
- Formerly of: Kambarkan

Salamat Sadikova (Kyrgyz: Саламат Садыкова; Arabic: سلامات صاديقوف; also Sadykova and Sadicova; born 28 September 1956 in Kyzyl Jol village, Batken, Kyrgyzstan) is a folk singer and the head of the coordinating council for the El-Ene (Mother Nation) Party in Kyrgyzstan. Widely regarded as a national treasure, she is often referred to by the sobriquet "The Voice of Kyrgyzstan," which is also the name of one of her albums.

== Career ==
Sadikova initially faced much prejudice as a woman performing in the conservative southern area of the former Kyrgyz Soviet Socialist Republic. Nonetheless, she eventually became the leader of the Kyrgyz national folk music and dance ensemble “Kambarkan”.

She has received numerous awards, among them the title People's Artist of Kyrgyzstan and "Honored Artist of the Republic of Kazakhstan", Winner of the State prize of Toktogul, Owner of the title of World's Master of Music, Korea.

Her first CD along with “Kambarkan” ensemble was released in Japan during their tours all around Japan. She produced and released a CD of her music in the United States with support from Mark A. Humphrey, who is an ethnomusicologist at UCLA.

=== Performances ===
Sadikova has performed—solo and with “Kambarkan”—throughout Central Asia, including the Sharq Taronalari (Eastern Melodies) international music festival in Samarkand, Uzbekistan. She has also performed at various countries outside of Central Asia, including Belgium, China, France, Germany, Italy, Japan, Korea, Netherlands, Russia, Spain, Turkey and the United States.

In 2003, she performed at the Days of Kyrgyz Culture in Moscow. In 2006, at the Shanghai Cooperation Organisation's annual conference, she performed in front of several heads of state, such as those of China and Russia. She was among the 36 international artists who performed at the first World Masters Festival of Arts and Culture—billed as "the cultural Olympics of the traditional artists of the world"—in Seoul in October 2007. In 2008, she was an Official Showcase Artist at WOMEX—a world music exposition held that year in Seville, Spain— along with being a part of the musical program for the "Rose of the World 2008" in Russia.

== Music and style ==
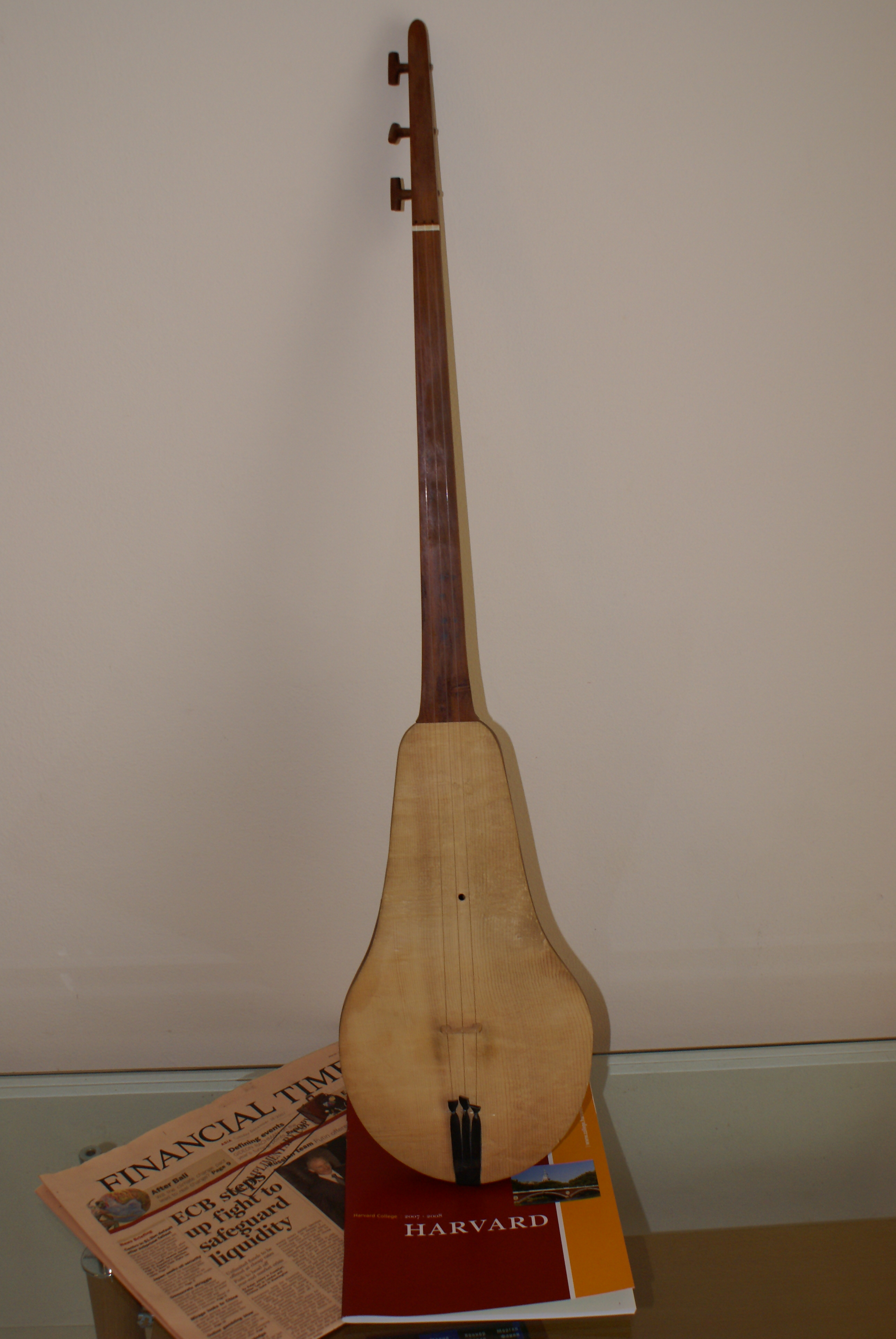
A Kyrgyz komuz, Sadikova's instrument of choice

Sadikova sings lyrical songs of the Kyrgyz people and accompanies herself on the Kyrgyz lute, called komuz. Some of her songs are traditional, or were popularized decades ago by Myskal Omurkanova (1915–1976), the first great Kyrgyz female artist to record extensively. Her other songs were often written specially for her by leading Kyrgyz and Kazakh composers, such as Kyrgyzstan's unofficial national anthem, Kyrgyz Jeri (Kyrgyz Land), though she performs some original compositions as well. In content and emotion, Sadikova's songs might be compared to the ghazal song tradition or to Portuguese fado.

As translated from a quote from Plural World, Sadikova says:

"My songs pertain to a love and nostalgia for the mountain villages, isolated, forgotten, even by the voice of my own land."

=== Notable songs ===
The follow are some popular pieces sung by Sadikova:

- "Esingdebi"
- "Alymkan"
- "Кыргыз жерим" (Kyrgyz Jeri)
- "Гүлгүн Жаш"
- "Ay nuru" (Moonlight)
- "Qïzïl gül"(Red Flower)

== Tours ==
In 2008 and 2009, Sadikova had concert tours in Moscow, Ukraine, Germany, Netherlands, Spain, Belgium, South Korea and Taiwan.

- WOMEX 2008 - Seville, Spain
- Festival Roza Mira - Moscow
- World's Master of Music – South Korea in 2007 and 2009
- Hengchun International Folk Song and Music Festival – Taiwan
- International Festival of Music and Dance "Svirzh" – Ukraine
- Tour concerts in Japan, Germany, Turkey, Netherlands, Belgium
- 2 solo concerts in Oman – Muscat and Salalah, in the frame of the cultural events of the Ministry of Tourism of Oman. February 2010

== Critical reception ==
Michael Heumann, in the online Stylus Magazine, wrote about Sadikova in 2003:

"To the list of the great female vocalists of the recording era — Billie Holiday, Sandy Denny, Aretha Franklin, Edith Piaf, and so on—add one more name: Salamat Sadikova. Never heard of her? You're not alone. Name recognition doesn't come easy for anyone in Kyrgyzstan, the most remote and isolated of former Soviet Central Asian republics. But ...Sadikova is that rare artist who can transform the simplest music into something truly magical."

== See also ==
- Music of Kyrgyzstan
- Sara Sadíqova
