= Sadeqabad, Kharameh =

Sadeqabad صادق اباد
- Village
- Location within Iran
- Coordinates: 29°30′09″N 53°17′27″E
- Country: Iran
- Province: Fars
- County: Kharameh
- Bakhsh: Central
- Rural District: Korbal

Population (2006)
  - Total: 189
- Time zone: UTC+3:30 (IRST)
  - Summer (DST): UTC+4:30 (IRDT)

Sadeqabad (Persian: صادق اباد, also Romanized as Şādeqābād) is a village in Korbal Rural District, in the Central District of Kharameh County, Fars province, Iran. At the 2006 census, its population was 189, in 43 families.
