= Sadiq Sillah =

Sierra Leone politician

Council Chairman of Pujehun District
- In office 2008–present

Personal details
- Born: October 19, 1969 (age 57) Pujehun, Pujehun District, Sierra Leone
- Party: Sierra Leone People's Party (SLPP)

Sadiq Sillah (born October 19, 1969) is a Sierra Leonean politician and the current District Council Chairman of Pujehun District in Southern Sierra Leone. He is a member of the Sierra Leone People's Party (SLPP).

He was first elected as Council Chairman of Pujehun District in a landslide victory in the 2008 Sierra Leone Local elections. He was easily re-elected again in the 2012 Sierra Leone Local elections with 67.73%, defeating his main opponent Ahmed Ken Kamara who took 14.08%.
