= Sidique Mussagi =

Mozambican footballer

Personal information
- Full name: Sidique Sataca Ismail Mussagi
- Date of birth: 24 October 1993 (age 33)
- Place of birth: Maputo, Mozambique
- Height: 1.70 m (5 ft 7 in)
- Position: Defender

Team information
- Current team: GD Maputo

Senior career*
Years	Team	Apps	(Gls)
2012–2017	GD Maputo		
2017–2018	Ferroviário		
2018–2023	GD Maputo	29	(1)

International career^{‡}
2012–	Mozambique	10	(0)
- * Club domestic league appearances and goals as of 24 July 2020 ‡ National team caps and goals as of 24 July 2020

Sidique Sataca Ismail Mussagi (born 24 October 1993) is a Mozambican footballer who plays as a defender for GD Maputo and the Mozambique national football team.

== Career ==
Mussagi's father Ismel Mussagi was a footballer with CD Maxaquene, and he also began his football training there.

=== International ===
Mussagi made his senior international debut on 23 June 2012, playing the entirety of a 1-0 friendly defeat to Vietnam.

== Career statistics ==
=== International ===
As of matches played 18 November 2019.

National team	Year	Apps	Goals
Mozambique	2012	2	0
Mozambique	2016	1	0
Mozambique	2019	7	0
Total		10	0
