= Sadik (surname) =

Sadik (Arabic: صديق) is an Arabic origin surname which is also used as a masculine given name. It means "friend" and "righteous and virtuous person." The word is used as Sadık in Turkish, and it was first recorded in Atabetü'l-Hakayık in the 12th century.

Notable people with the surname include:

== Sadik ==
- Irfan Sadik (born 1999), Albanian–Finnish football player
- Janette Sadik-Khan (born 1961), American civil servant
- Mahmud Sadik (born 1952), citizen of Afghanistan who was held in the United States Guantanamo Bay detention camps, in Cuba
- Nafis Sadik (1929–2022), Pakistani physician
- Omar Sadik (born 2004), Moroccan football player
- Omowunmi Sadik (born 1964), Nigerian chemist
- Sadik Mohammed Symon (born 1985), known as Symon Sadik, Bangladeshi film actor
- Shibli Sadik (1941–2010), Bangladeshi film director
- Sullemana Sadik (born 1960), Ghanaian boxer
- Xhafer Sadik (1874–1945), Albanian leader of the Bektashi Order
- Sadik Yussaf (born 2005), Somali Model in Denmark for Scoop models

== Sadık ==
- Kamer Sadık (1911–1986), Turkish actor of Armenian origin
