= Sádek (Svitavy District) =

- Municipality
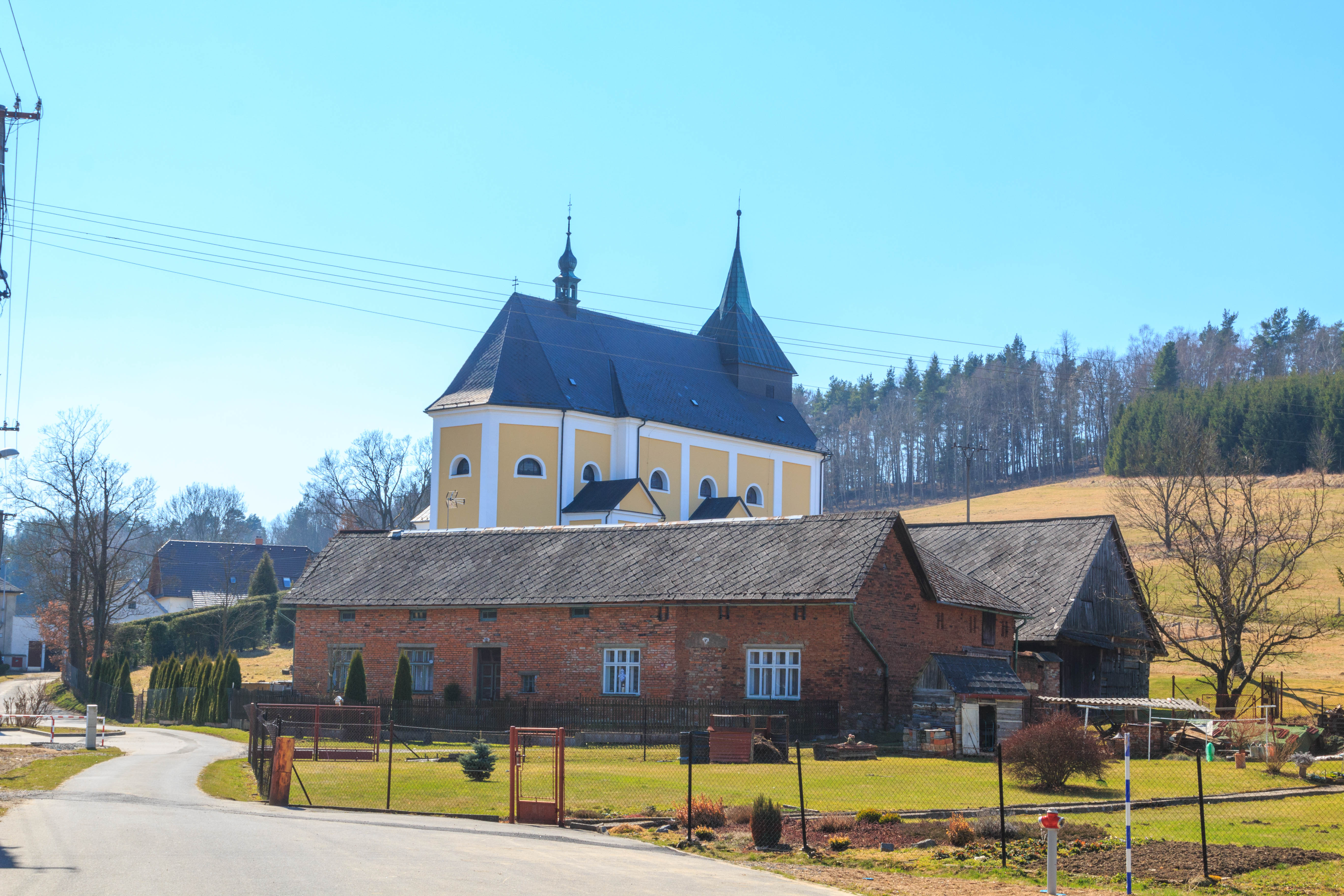
- Church of the Holy Trinity

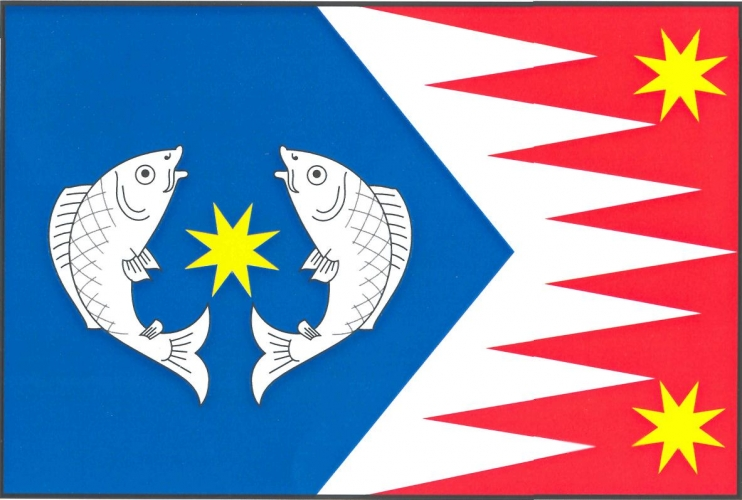
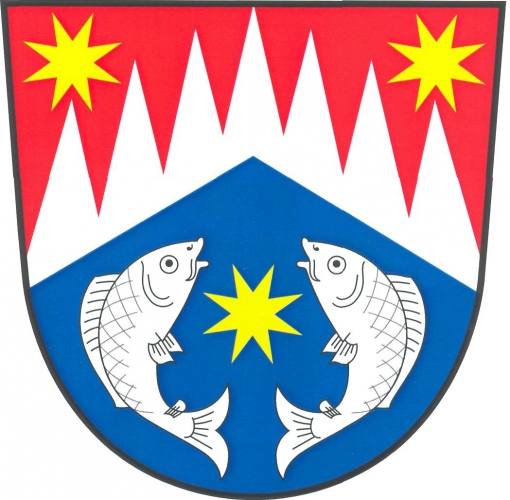
- Flag Coat of arms

- Location in the Czech Republic
- Coordinates: 49°41′33″N 16°13′32″E
- Country: Czech Republic
- Region: Pardubice
- District: Svitavy
- First mentioned: 1557

Area
  - Total: 9.91 km^{2} (3.83 sq mi)
- Elevation: 543 m (1,781 ft)

Population (2026-01-01)
  - Total: 556
  - Density: 56.1/km^{2} (145/sq mi)
- Time zone: UTC+1 (CET)
  - Summer (DST): UTC+2 (CEST)
- Postal code: 572 01
- Website: www.obecsadek.cz

Sádek is a municipality and village in Svitavy District in the Pardubice Region of the Czech Republic. It has about 600 inhabitants.

Sádek lies approximately 20 kilometres (12 mi) west of Svitavy, 49 km (30 mi) south-east of Pardubice, and 136 km (85 mi) east of Prague.

== Demographics ==
Historical population
Year	Pop.	±%
1869	724	—
1880	732	+1.1%
1890	704	−3.8%
1900	770	+9.4%
1910	774	+0.5%
1921	737	−4.8%
1930	752	+2.0%
1950	519	−31.0%
1961	567	+9.2%
1970	550	−3.0%
1980	442	−19.6%
1991	445	+0.7%
2001	456	+2.5%
2011	489	+7.2%
2021	539	+10.2%
Source: Censuses
