= Siddique =

Siddique is a masculine given name and surname of Arabic origin. It is derived from the Arabic word صدّيق (meaning "truthful"). Notable people with the name include:

== Given name ==
- Siddique (actor) (born 1962), Indian actor
- Siddique (director) (1955–2023), Indian director and script writer
- Siddique Ahmed (Indian politician) (1962–2026), Indian politician
- Siddique Khan Baloch (born 1959), Pakistani politician
- Siddique Ahmed Chowdhury, Bangladeshi judge
- Siddique Dawood (died 2005), Pakistani industrialist and politician
- Siddique Dewan (1897–1990), Bangladeshi footballer and police officer
- Siddique Hossain, Bangladeshi politician
- Siddique Salik (1935–1988), Pakistani general and author
- Siddique Zobair, Bangladeshi civil servant

== Surname ==
- AAMS Arefin Siddique (born 1953), Bangladeshi academic
- Ab Siddique (1927–2012), Bangladeshi politician
- Abubakar Siddique (1936–2023), Bangladeshi poet, novelist, short story writer, and critic
- Abdul Kader Siddique (born 1947), Bangladeshi politician
- Abubakar Boniface Siddique (born 1960), Ghanaian politician
- Amjad Siddique (born 1959), Pakistani cricketer
- Baba Siddique (1958–2024), Indian politician
- Hafiz Muhammad Siddique (1819–1890), Pakistani scholar and writer
- Hamza Siddique (born 1991), English cricketer
- Hasan Foez Siddique (born 1956), Bangladeshi judge
- Islahuddin Siddique (born 1948), Pakistani field hockey player
- John Siddique (born 1964), British spiritual teacher, poet, and author
- Junaid Siddique (born 1987), Bangladeshi cricketer
- Junaid Siddique (Emirati cricketer) (born 1992), Pakistani-Emirati cricketer
- M. Osman Siddique (born 1950), American politician and diplomat
- Muhammad Siddique (born 1948), Pakistani middle-distance runner
- Nadeem Siddique (born 1977), British-Pakistani boxer
- Palbasha Siddique (born 1991), Bangladeshi-American singer
- Rabia Siddique (born 1971), Australian criminal and human rights lawyer
- Syed Muhammed Siddique, Bengali politician
- T Siddique (born 1976), Indian politician
- Tahir Hussain Siddique, Indian politician
- Tahjib Alam Siddique (born 1975), Bangladesh politician
- Tarique Siddique (born 1994), Indian cricketer
- Tarique Ahmed Siddique, Bangladeshi Army officer
- Zeeshan Siddique (born 1992), Indian politician

== Others ==
- Siddique–Lal, Indian screenwriter and director duo, consisting of Siddique and Lal active together in Malayalam cinema

== See also ==
- Sidique, a given surname
- Siddiqui
- Siddiqi
- Siddiq (name)
- Sadek (disambiguation)
- Sadeq (disambiguation)
- Sadiq (disambiguation)
- Sadegh (disambiguation)
