= Beyza =

City in Fars province, Iran

Beyza Persian: بیضا
- City
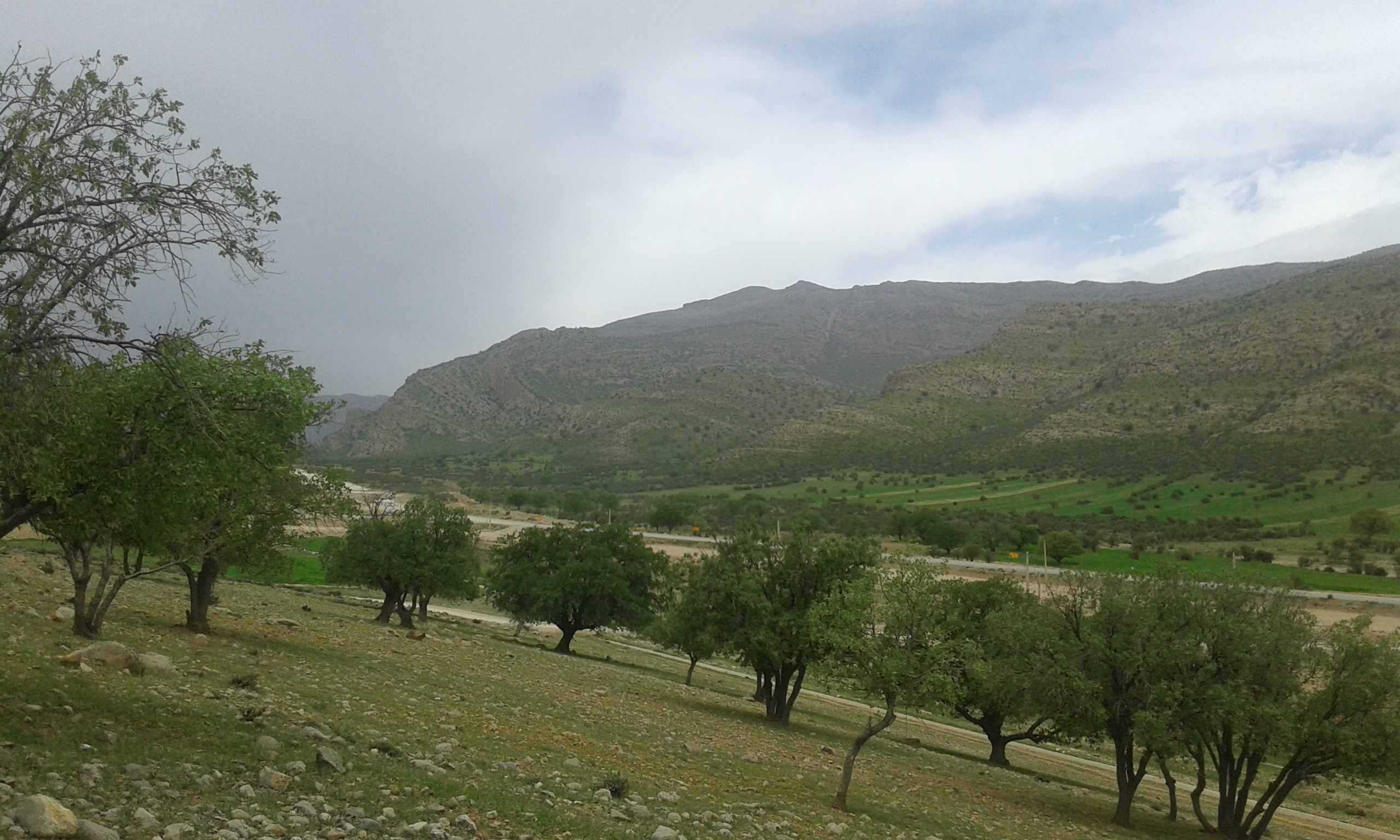
- The countryside of Beyza

- Location within Iran
- Coordinates: 30°00′29″N 52°21′30″E
- Country: Iran
- Province: Fars
- County: Beyza
- District: Central

Population (2016)
  - Total: 7,252
- Time zone: UTC+3:30 (IRST)

Beyza (Persian: بيضا) (Note: Also romanized as Bayzâ, Beyzā, and Beyẕā; also known as Bayḍā; formerly Harabal (هرابال)) is a city in the Central District of Beyza County, Fars province, Iran, serving as capital of both the county and the district. It is also the administrative center for Beyza Rural District.

== Demographics ==
=== Population ===
At the time of the 2006 National Census, the city's population was 3,593 in 845 households, when it was the capital of the former Beyza District of Sepidan County. The following census in 2011 counted 4,234 people in 1,148 households. The 2016 census measured the population of the city as 7,252 people in 1,952 households.

In 2019, the district was separated from the county in the establishment of Beyza County. The city and the rural district were transferred to the new Central District, with Beyza as the county's capital.
