= Mohammad Siddiq Chakari =

Afghan politician

Mohammad Siddiq Chakari (born 4 August 1961) is an Afghan politician.

Chakari was born in Chakari, Kabul Province, Afghanistan. He studied at the Madrasa E Abu Hanifa until grade 12 and travelled to Saudi Arabia for further and higher education. He completed a master's degree (MA) and was a successful graduate of Islamic studies.

When he returned to his country, he joined the mujahideen and was a leader of the fight against the Soviet invasion. After 14 years of jihad Chakari was given a place in the Afghan cabinet as information minister.

He also wrote and translated his book, Lizat-E-Eman, Sifat-E-Qumandaan, and Moral-e-mujahid in Persian and Arabic.

He was also appointed an advisory minister to President Hamid Karzai
