= Sadeqabad, Dehshir =

Sadeqabad صادق اباد
- Village
- Location within Iran
- Coordinates: 31°43′04″N 53°57′08″E
- Country: Iran
- Province: Yazd
- County: Taft
- Bakhsh: Central
- Rural District: Dehshir

Population (2006)
  - Total: 27
- Time zone: UTC+3:30 (IRST)
  - Summer (DST): UTC+4:30 (IRDT)

Sadeqabad (Persian: صادق اباد, also Romanized as Şādeqābād; also known as Sadeq Abad Pishkooh, Şādeqābād Pīshkūh, and Sādiqābād) is a village in Dehshir Rural District, in the Central District of Taft County, Yazd Province, Iran. At the 2006 census, its population was 27, in 8 families.
