= Sadeqabad, Rizab =

Sadeqabad صادق اباد
- Village
- Location within Iran
- Coordinates: 28°55′48″N 54°57′20″E
- Country: Iran
- Province: Fars
- County: Neyriz
- Bakhsh: Qatruyeh
- Rural District: Rizab

Population (2006)
  - Total: 188
- Time zone: UTC+3:30 (IRST)
  - Summer (DST): UTC+4:30 (IRDT)

Sadeqabad (Persian: صادق اباد, also Romanized as Şādeqābād) is a village in Rizab Rural District, Qatruyeh District, Neyriz County, Fars province, Iran. At the 2006 census, its population was 188, in 51 families.
