= Sadeqabad, Fasa =

Sadeqabad صادق اباد
- Village
- Location within Iran
- Coordinates: 29°07′58″N 53°29′24″E
- Country: Iran
- Province: Fars
- County: Fasa
- Bakhsh: Central
- Rural District: Jangal

Population (2006)
  - Total: 124
- Time zone: UTC+3:30 (IRST)
  - Summer (DST): UTC+4:30 (IRDT)

Sadeqabad (Persian: صادق اباد, also Romanized as Şādeqābād; also known as Sadegh Abad) is a village in Jangal Rural District, in the Central District of Fasa County, Fars province, Iran. At the 2006 census, its population was 124, in 27 families.
