= Sadeqabad-e Sagbu =

Sadeqabad-e Sagbu صادق ابادسگبو
- Village
- Location within Iran
- Coordinates: 32°21′00″N 49°25′00″E
- Country: Iran
- Province: Khuzestan
- County: Andika
- Bakhsh: Central
- Rural District: Qaleh-ye Khvajeh

Population (2006)
  - Total: 194
- Time zone: UTC+3:30 (IRST)
  - Summer (DST): UTC+4:30 (IRDT)

Sadeqabad-e Sagbu (Persian: صادق ابادسگبو, also Romanized as Şādeqābād-e Sagbū) is a village in Qaleh-ye Khvajeh Rural District, in the Central District of Andika County, Khuzestan Province, Iran. At the 2006 census, its population was 194, in 33 families.
