= Sadeq, Iran =

Sadeq صادق
- Village
- Country: Iran
- Province: Khuzestan
- County: Shush
- Bakhsh: Shavur
- Rural District: Ahudasht

Population (2006)
  - Total: 145
- Time zone: UTC+3:30 (IRST)
  - Summer (DST): UTC+4:30 (IRDT)

Sadeq (Persian: صادق, also Romanized as Şādeq) is a village in Ahudasht Rural District, Shavur District, Shush County, Khuzestan Province, Iran. At the 2006 census, its population was 145, in 22 families.

Of note, this word "Sadeq" literally means honest/truthful; meanwhile, the root of choosing this name for many of people/places can be related to Imam Jafar al-Sadeq (al-Sadiq) as the 6th Imam of Shia Islam.
