= Ali Sadeq Benwan =

Iraqi footballer

Ali Sadeq
Personal information
- Full name: Ali Sadeq Mousa Benwan Al-Mayahi
- Date of birth: 30 November 1991 (age 34)
- Place of birth: Iraq
- Height: 1.81 m (5 ft 11 1/2 in)
- Positions: Winger; right back

Senior career*
Years	Team	Apps	(Gls)
2011–2012	Al-Kharaitiyat		
2012–2016	Muaither		
2016–2020	Al Ahli	21	(0)
2019	→ Muaither (loan)		
2019–2020	→ Al-Shamal (loan)		
- * Club domestic league appearances and goals

Ali Sadeq Benwan (Arabic:علي صادق بنوان) (born 30 November 1991) is an Iraqi footballer who plays as a winger.
