= Sadeqabad, Divandarreh =

Sadeqabad صادق آباد
- Village
- Location within Iran
- Coordinates: 35°39′17″N 47°10′09″E
- Country: Iran
- Province: Kurdistan
- County: Divandarreh
- Bakhsh: Saral
- Rural District: Hoseynabad-e Shomali

Population (2006)
  - Total: 208
- Time zone: UTC+3:30 (IRST)
  - Summer (DST): UTC+4:30 (IRDT)

Sadeqabad (Persian: صادق آباد, also Romanized as Şādeqābād; also known as Şadaqehābād and Sadqehābād) is a village in Hoseynabad-e Shomali Rural District, Saral District, Divandarreh County, Kurdistan Province, Iran. At the 2006 census, its population was 208, in 47 families. The village is populated by Kurds.
