= Sadeqabad, Lorestan =

Sadeqabad صادق آباد
- Village
- Location within Iran
- Coordinates: 33°52′11″N 48°17′05″E
- Country: Iran
- Province: Lorestan
- County: Selseleh
- Bakhsh: Central
- Rural District: Qaleh-ye Mozaffari

Population (2006)
  - Total: 53
- Time zone: UTC+3:30 (IRST)
  - Summer (DST): UTC+4:30 (IRDT)

Sadeqabad (Persian: صادق آباد, also Romanized as Şādeqābād) is a village in Qaleh-ye Mozaffari Rural District, in the Central District of Selseleh County, Lorestan Province, Iran. At the 2006 census, its population was 53 people in 12 families.
