= Syed Muhammed Siddique =

Bengali politician

Member of the Bengal Legislative Assembly
- In office 1937–1947
- Constituency: Bankura

Personal details
- Born: Rol, Bankura district, Bengal Presidency
- Awards: Khan Bahadur, C.I.E

Syed Muhammed Siddique was a Bengali politician from Bankura district. He was awarded Khan Bahadur and CIE by the British Raj.

== Early life and education ==
Siddique was born into a Bengali family of Muslim Syeds in the village of Rol in the Bankura district of the Bengal Presidency. He graduated with an MBBS.

== Career ==
Siddique contested in the 1937 Bengal elections and won a seat at the Bengal Legislative Assembly. He was re-elected following the 1946 Bengal Legislative Assembly election.
