= Siddiq =

Arabic term for truthful

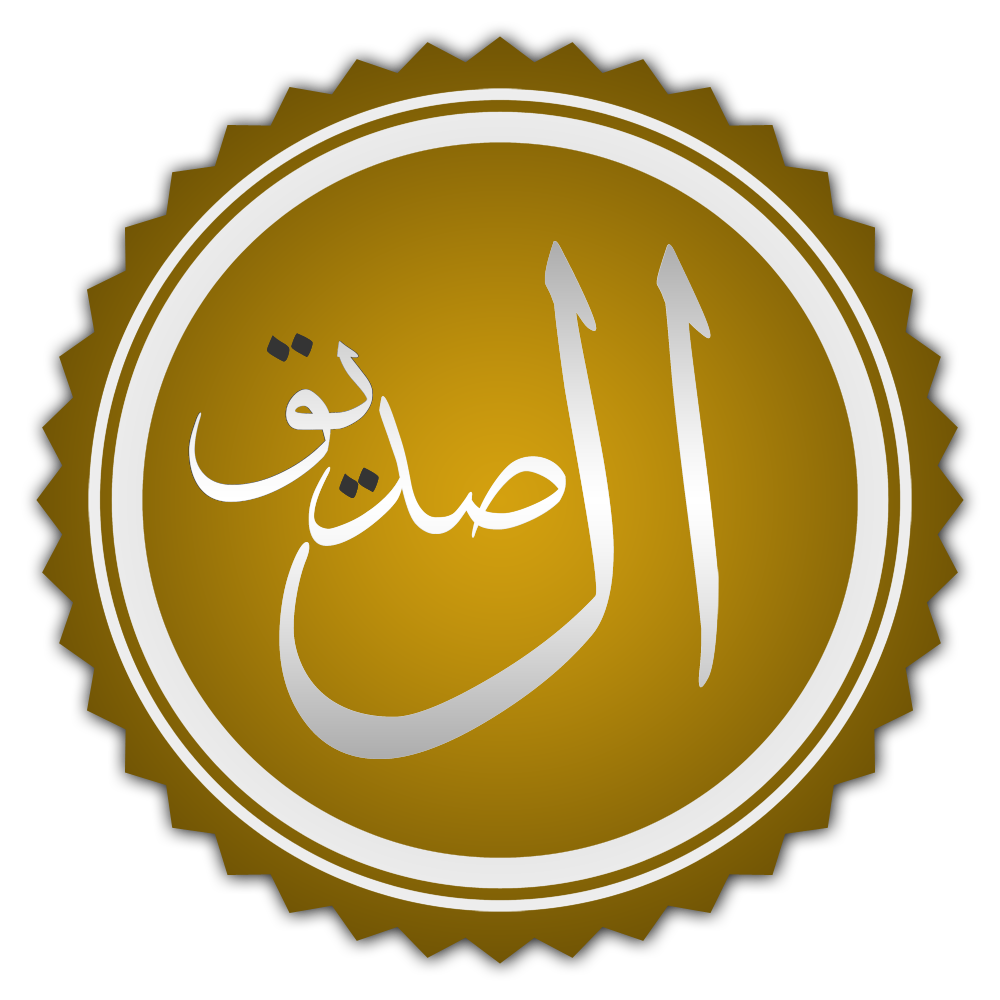
- Arabic Calligraphic representation of Siddiq
- Pronunciation: Siddiq; Arabic: صِدّیق
- Language: Arabic

Origin
- Meaning: Truthful
- Region of origin: Arabia (Middle East)

Siddiq (Arabic: صِدّیق, pronounced [sˤɪdˈdiːq]; meaning "truthful") is an Islamic term and is given as an honorific title to certain individuals. The feminine gender for Siddiq is Siddiqah. The word is sometimes used as a title given to individuals by the Islamic prophet Muhammad. For example, it was a title of Abu Bakr, the first Islamic caliph from 632 to 634. Otherwise, it is used to denote that the person is totally trustworthy.

== Sunni usage ==
Sunni Muslims use Siddiq as an epithet for Abu Bakr, the first Caliph of Islam and the closest friend of Muhammad, while they use Siddiqah for Aisha, Abu Bakr's daughter and the Prophet's wife.

== Sufi term ==
In Sufism, Siddiq is a rank that comes after prophet. It is generally given to a person who verified the claim of prophethood in its early stage. Sufis believe the following four ranks are free of time and space and therefore life and death becomes meaningless to them.

1. Nabi – Prophet, someone who learned of the unseen from God directly
2. Siddiq – Early day Muslim who learned the unseen from Muhammad
3. Shaheed – Martyr, someone who died for the will of God and has thus become beyond mortality.
4. Salih – Righteous, someone who spends every bit of their life per the will of God and thus achieved the status of "Baqaa" through Fanaa. Also referred to as Wali.

These four ranks are mentioned in the Quran.

== Shia usage ==
According to Ibn Dimashqi, Muhammad referred to Ali as al-Siddiq al-Akbar (the greatest truthful one). According to this narration, Ali is identified as one of the three truthful ones. The other two were Habib al-Najjar, a pre-Islamic saint; and the other is from the people of Pharaoh, who is mentioned in Surah Ghafir, verses 28-45. Siddiqa, the feminine equivalent of Siddiq, is from the titles of Fatima in Shia.

== Other usage ==
In Hebrew the word/name "Tzadik" (צדיק), has a similar meaning. The title of Voltaire's satirical novella Zadig also stems from this name root.

== See also ==
- Rabbani
- Siddiqui
- Qallu
- Tzadik
