= Sadegh =

Sadegh, or accented Sādegh (in Persian: صادق), is an Iranian name and variant of Sadeq.

== Given name ==
- Sadegh Aliakbarzadeh (1932-2007), Iranian boxer
- Sadegh Amirazizi (1905–1992), Iranian army general and politician
- Sadegh Choubak (1916–1998), Iranian author of short fiction, drama, and novels
- Sadegh Gashni (born 1986), Iranian footballer
- Sadegh Ghotbzadeh (1936–1982), Iranian politician
- Sadegh Goudarzi (born 1987), Iranian wrestler
- Sadegh Hedayat (1903–1951), Iranian writer, translator, and intellectual
- Sadegh Karamyar (born 1959), Iranian writer, journalist, screenwriter, and film director
- Sadegh Khalkhali (1926–2003), Shia cleric of the Islamic Republic of Iran
- Sadegh Kharazi (born 1963), Iranian diplomat and advisor to Iran's former President Khatami
- Sadegh Mahsouli (born 1959), Iranian politician and government minister
- Sadegh Malek Shahmirzadi (1940-2020), Iranian archaeologist and anthropologist
- Sadegh Moharrami (born 1996), Iranian footballer
- Sadegh Najafi-Khazarlou (born 1960), Iranian politician and mayor of Tabriz
- Sadegh Nezam-mafi (1925–2009), Iranian physician and a pioneer of nuclear medicine in Iran
- Sadegh Nojouki (born 1950), Iranian pop and classical musician, composer, songwriter, arranger
- Sadegh Omidzadeh (died 2024), Iranian general
- Sadegh Sharafkandi (1938–1992), Kurdish politician and the Secretary-General of the Kurdistan Democratic Party of Iran
- Sadegh Tabrizi (1938–2017), Iranian modern painter, calligrapher
- Sadegh Vahedi, (born 1991) Iranian rapper
- Sadegh Vaez-Zadeh (born 1959), Iranian professor and academician
- Sadegh Varmazyar (born 1966), Iranian footballer
- Sadegh Zibakalam (born 1948), Iranian academic, author and pundit

== Middle name ==
- Mohammad Sadegh Barani (born 1991), Iranian footballer
- Mohammad Sadegh Karami (born 1984), Iranian footballer
- Mohammad-Sadegh Salehimanesh, Iranian cleric and politician

== Surname ==
- Habib Sadegh, Tunisian football manager
- Sadegh Sadegh, Iranian diplomat and constitutionalist politician

== See also ==
- Sadeq (disambiguation)
- 12572 Sadegh, a minor planet. See Meanings of minor planet names: 12001–13000#572
- Sadek (disambiguation)
- Sadiq (disambiguation)
- Siddiq (name)
- Siddique (disambiguation)
