= Central District (Beyza County) =

District in Fars province, Iran

Central District (Beyza County) Persian: بخش مرکزی شهرستان بیضا
- District
- Location within Iran
- Coordinates: 29°58′06″N 52°22′57″E
- Country: Iran
- Province: Fars
- County: Beyza
- Capital: Beyza
- Time zone: UTC+3:30 (IRST)

The Central District of Beyza County (Persian: بخش مرکزی شهرستان بیضا) is in Fars province, Iran. Its capital is the city of Beyza, whose population at the time of the 2016 National Census was 7,252 in 1,952 households. (Note: Formerly Harabal)

== History ==
In 2019, Beyza District was separated from Sepidan County in the establishment of Beyza County, which was divided into two districts of two rural districts each, with Beyza as its capital and only city.

== Demographics ==
=== Administrative divisions ===
Central District (Beyza County)
Administrative Divisions
Beyza RD
Kushk-e Hezar RD
Beyza (city)
RD = Rural District
