= Kushk-e Hezar Rural District =

Rural district in Fars province, Iran

Kushk-e Hezar Rural District Persian: دهستان کوشک هزار
- Rural District
- Location within Iran
- Coordinates: 29°54′23″N 52°28′30″E
- Country: Iran
- Province: Fars
- County: Beyza
- District: Central
- Capital: Kushk-e Hezar

Population (2016)
  - Total: 10,885
- Time zone: UTC+3:30 (IRST)

Kushk-e Hezar Rural District (Persian: دهستان کوشک هزار) is in the Central District of Beyza County, Fars province, Iran. Its capital is the village of Kushk-e Hezar.

== Demographics ==
=== Population ===
At the time of the 2006 National Census, the rural district's population (as a part of the former Beyza District of Sepidan County) was 9,622 in 2,301 households. There were 10,848 inhabitants in 2,955 households at the following census of 2011. The 2016 census measured the population of the rural district as 10,885 in 3,190 households. The most populous of its 42 villages was Sheykh Abud, with 3,181 people.

In 2019, the district was separated from the county in the establishment of Beyza County, and the rural district was transferred to the new Central District.
