= Sadiq =

Sadiq may refer to:

== Places ==
- Sadiq (town), Faridkot district, Punjab, India
- Sadiq Public School, Bahawalpur, Punjab, Pakistan

== People and characters ==
- Sadiq (name), a given name or surname
- Sadiq (Indian actor) (born 1956), Indian actor in Malayalam films
- Sadiq (The Office), a character in the American sitcom The Office
