= Beyza County =

County in Fars province, Iran

Beyza County Persian: شهرستان بیضا
- County
- Location of Beyza County in Fars province (center left, green)

- Location of Fars province in Iran
- Coordinates: 30°00′04″N 52°22′56″E
- Country: Iran
- Province: Fars
- Capital: Beyza
- Districts: Central, Banesh
- Time zone: UTC+3:30 (IRST)

Beyza County (Persian: شهرستان بیضا) is in Fars province, Iran. Its capital is the city of Beyza, whose population at the time of the 2016 National Census was 7,252 in 1,952 households. (Note: Formerly Harabal)

== History ==
In 2019, Beyza District was separated from Sepidan County in the establishment of Beyza County, which was divided into two districts of two rural districts each, with Beyza as its capital and only city.

== Demographics ==
=== Administrative divisions ===
Beyza County's administrative structure is shown in the following table.

Beyza County Population
Administrative Divisions
Central District
Beyza RD
Kushk-e Hezar RD
Beyza (city)
Banesh District
Banesh RD
Haftkhan RD
RD = Rural District

== See also ==
Media related to Beyza County at Wikimedia Commons
