= Banesh Rural District =

Rural district in Fars province, Iran

Banesh Rural District Persian: دهستان بانش
- Rural District
- Location within Iran
- Coordinates: 30°06′17″N 52°28′20″E
- Country: Iran
- Province: Fars
- County: Beyza
- District: Banesh
- Capital: Banesh

Population (2016)
  - Total: 9,397
- Time zone: UTC+3:30 (IRST)

Banesh Rural District (Persian: دهستان بانش) is in Banesh District of Beyza County, Fars province, Iran. Its capital is the village of Banesh.

== Demographics ==
=== Population ===
At the time of the 2006 National Census, the rural district's population (as a part of the former Beyza District of Sepidan County) was 9,718 in 2,214 households. There were 9,422 inhabitants in 2,656 households at the following census of 2011. The 2016 census measured the population of the rural district as 9,397 in 2,698 households. The most populous of its 31 villages was Banesh, with 2,873 people.

In 2019, the district was separated from the county in the establishment of Beyza County, and the rural district was transferred to the new Banesh District.
