= Beyza Rural District =

Rural district in Fars province, Iran

Beyza Rural District Persian: دهستان بيضا
- Rural District
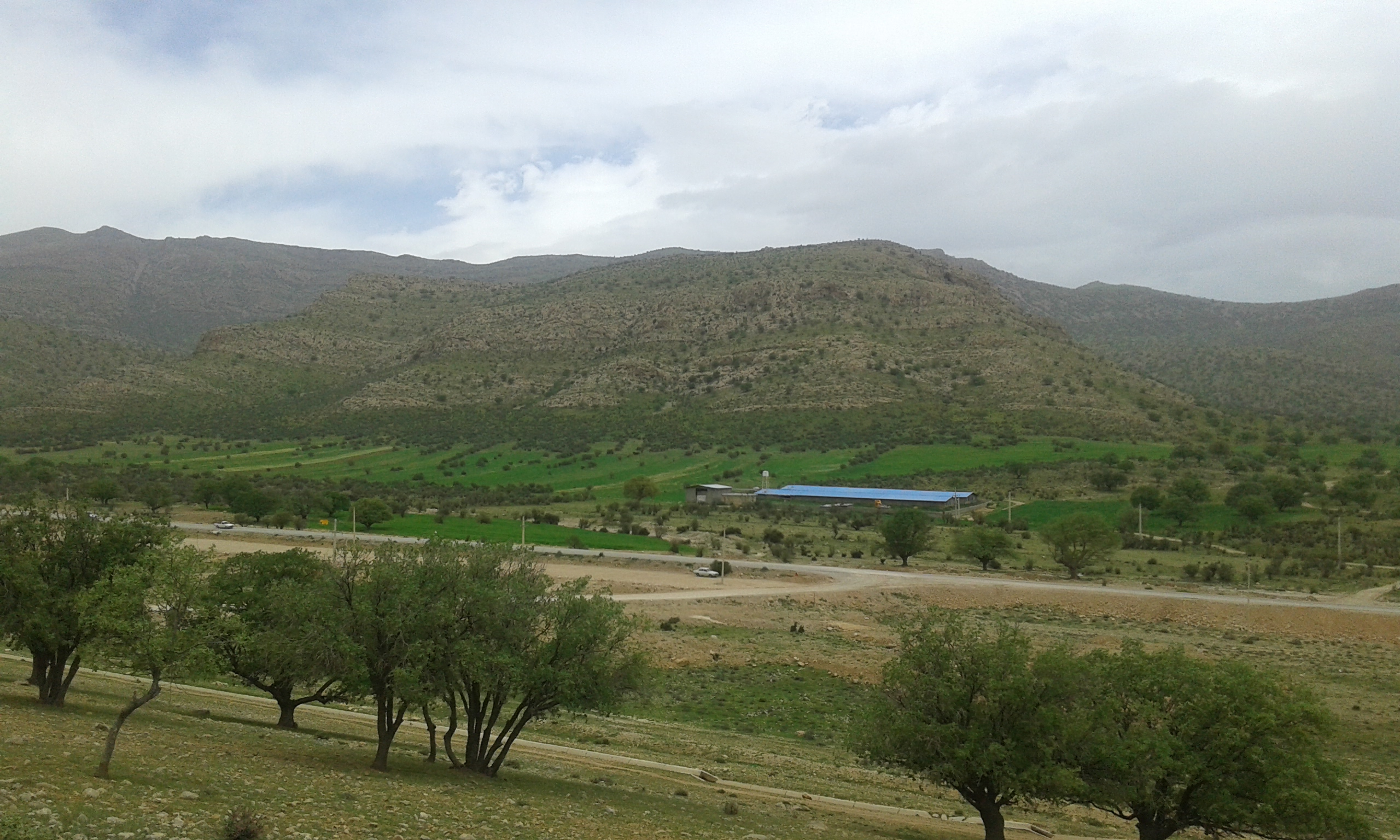

- Location within Iran
- Coordinates: 30°00′56″N 52°17′56″E
- Country: Iran
- Province: Fars
- County: Beyza
- District: Central
- Capital: Beyza

Population (2016)
  - Total: 12,349
- Time zone: UTC+3:30 (IRST)

Beyza Rural District (Persian: دهستان بيضا) is in the Central District of Beyza County, Fars province, Iran. It is administered from the city of Beyza. (Note: Formerly Harabal)

== Demographics ==
=== Population ===
At the time of the 2006 National Census, the rural district's population (as a part of the former Beyza District of Sepidan County) was 13,761 in 3,205 households. There were 12,233 inhabitants in 3,498 households at the following census of 2011. The 2016 census measured the population of the rural district as 12,349 in 3,695 households. The most populous of its 44 villages was Jian, with 1,905 people.

In 2019, the district was separated from the county in the establishment of Beyza County, and the rural district was transferred to the new Central District.
