= Beyza District =

Former district in Fars province, Iran

Beyza District Persian: بخش بیضا
- Former District
- Location within Iran
- Coordinates: 30°00′04″N 52°22′56″E
- Country: Iran
- Province: Fars
- County: Sepidan
- Capital: Beyza

Population (2016)
  - Total: 39,883
- Time zone: UTC+3:30 (IRST)

Beyza District (Persian: بخش بیضا) is a former administrative division of Sepidan County, Fars province, Iran. Its capital was the city of Beyza. (Note: Formerly Harabal)

== History ==
After the 2016 National Census, the district was separated from the county in the establishment of Beyza County.

== Demographics ==
=== Population ===
At the time of the 2006 census, the district's population was 36,694 in 8,565 households. The following census in 2011 counted 36,737 people in 10,257 households. The 2016 census measured the population of the district as 39,883 inhabitants in 11,535 households.

=== Administrative divisions ===
Beyza District Population
Administrative Divisions	2006	2011	2016
Banesh RD	9,718	9,422	9,397
Beyza RD	13,761	12,233	12,349
Kushk-e Hezar RD	9,622	10,848	10,885
Beyza (city)	3,593	4,234	7,252
Total	36,694	36,737	39,883
RD = Rural District
