= Tall Zari =

Tall Zari or Tol Zari or Tol-e Zari (Persian: تل زري) may refer to:

- Tol Zari, Fars
- Tall Zari, Kohgiluyeh and Boyer-Ahmad
