= Darreh Hamyaneh =

Darreh Hamyaneh (Persian: دره هميانه), also known as Darhamyaneh or Darreh Hambaneh, may refer to:

- Darreh Hamyaneh-ye Olya
- Darreh Hamyaneh-ye Sofla
