= Marzian =

Marzian or Morzian (Persian: مرزيان) may refer to:

- Morzian, Fars
- Marzian, Lorestan
