= Morzian, Fars =

Morzian مرزيان
- Village
- Location within Iran
- Coordinates: 30°29′02″N 51°59′36″E
- Country: Iran
- Province: Fars
- County: Sepidan
- Bakhsh: Central
- Rural District: Komehr

Population (2006)
  - Total: 632
- Time zone: UTC+3:30 (IRST)
  - Summer (DST): UTC+4:30 (IRDT)

Morzian (Persian: مورزيان, also Romanized as Morzīān; also known as Mowrzeyān and Mūrzīān) is a village in Komehr Rural District, in the Central District of Sepidan County, Fars province, Iran. At the 2006 census, its population was 632, in 55 families.

Due to its proximity to the Margon Waterfall, the village receives fewer visitors relative to nearby attractions. Prominent local families include the Abdeshahi, Ghaffari, and Ettehadpour families. Notable individuals associated with the village include Mohammadreza Ettehadpour, who died during the Iran-Iraq War in 1363 SH (1984-1985). Several residents from Morzian have pursued higher education at Iranian institutions - such as Sharif University of Technology, Shahid Bahonar University of Kerman, and Shahid Chamran University of Ahvaz - and work in professional fields, including medicine in nearby Shiraz.
