= Darreh Hamyaneh-ye Olya =

Darreh Hamyaneh-ye Olya دره هميانه عليا
- Village
- Location within Iran
- Coordinates: 30°32′36″N 51°59′10″E
- Country: Iran
- Province: Fars
- County: Sepidan
- Bakhsh: Central
- Rural District: Komehr

Population (2006)
  - Total: 324
- Time zone: UTC+3:30 (IRST)
  - Summer (DST): UTC+4:30 (IRDT)

Darreh Hamyaneh-ye Olya (Persian: دره هميانه عليا, also Romanized as Darreh Hamyāneh-ye 'Olyā; also known as Darhamyāneh-ye Bālā and Darreh Hambāneh-ye Bālā) is a village in Komehr Rural District, in the Central District of Sepidan County, Fars province, Iran. At the 2006 census, its population was 324, in 75 families.
