= Darreh Hamyaneh-ye Sofla =

Darreh Hamyaneh-ye Sofla دره هميانه سفلي
- Village
- Location within Iran
- Coordinates: 30°30′22″N 51°59′32″E
- Country: Iran
- Province: Fars
- County: Sepidan
- Bakhsh: Central
- Rural District: Komehr

Population (2006)
  - Total: 166
- Time zone: UTC+3:30 (IRST)
  - Summer (DST): UTC+4:30 (IRDT)

Darreh Hamyaneh-ye Sofla (Persian: دره هميانه سفلي, also Romanized as Darreh Hamyāneh-ye Soflá; also known as Darhamyāneh-ye Pā’īn and Darreh Hambāneh-ye Pā’īn) is a village in Komehr Rural District, in the Central District of Sepidan County, Fars province, Iran. At the 2006 census, its population was 166, in 38 families.
