= Tol Zari, Fars =

Tol Zari تل زري
- Village
- Location within Iran
- Coordinates: 30°32′25″N 51°57′33″E
- Country: Iran
- Province: Fars
- County: Sepidan
- Bakhsh: Central
- Rural District: Komehr

Population (2006)
  - Total: 230
- Time zone: UTC+3:30 (IRST)
  - Summer (DST): UTC+4:30 (IRDT)

Tol Zari (Persian: تل زري, also Romanized as Tol Zarī, Tall Zarī, and Tol-e Zarī) is a village in Komehr Rural District, in the Central District of Sepidan County, Fars province, Iran. At the 2006 census, its population was 230, in 50 families.
