= 1972 Iran blizzard =

Deadliest blizzard in history

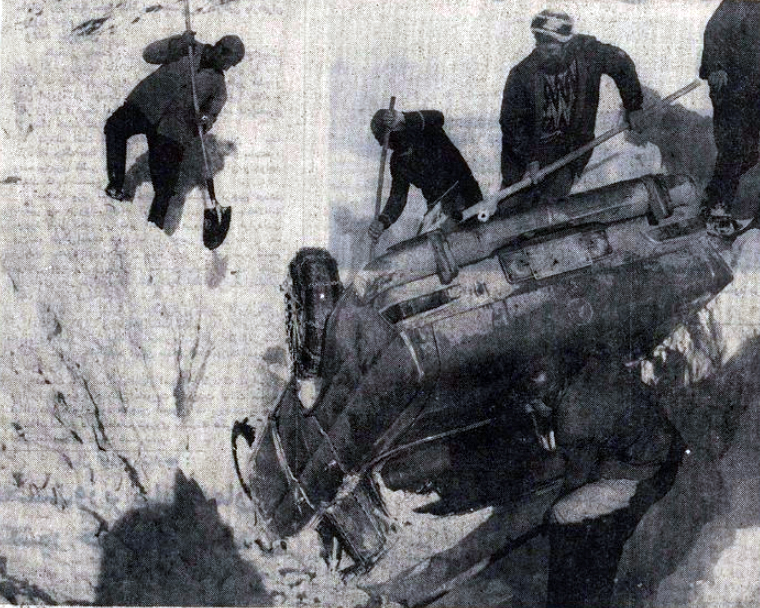
- People helping a crashed car some days before the height of 1972 Iran blizzard

Meteorological history
- Formed: February 3, 1972.
- Dissipated: February 9, 1972

Blizzard
- Max. snowfall: 8 m (26 ft)

Overall effects
- Fatalities: ≥ 4,000 (Deadliest winter storm on record)
- Damage: ≥ $20 million

The Iran blizzard of February 1972 was the deadliest blizzard in history, as recorded by the Guinness Book of Records. A week-long period of low temperatures and severe winter storms, lasting 3–9 days in February 1972, resulted in the deaths of over 4,000 people. Storms dumped more than 7.9 metres (25 ft 11 in) of snow across rural areas in northwestern, central and southern Iran. The blizzard came after four years of drought.

Southern Iran received as much as 7.9 metres (26 ft) of snow, burying at least 4,000 individuals. According to contemporary reports by the newspaper Ettela'at, the city of Ardakan and outlying villages were hardest hit, with no survivors in Kakkan or Kumar. In the northwest, near the border with Turkey, the village of Shaklabad and its 100 inhabitants were buried. According to some experts, about 200 villages were buried under the snow and completely erased from the map.

== The events ==
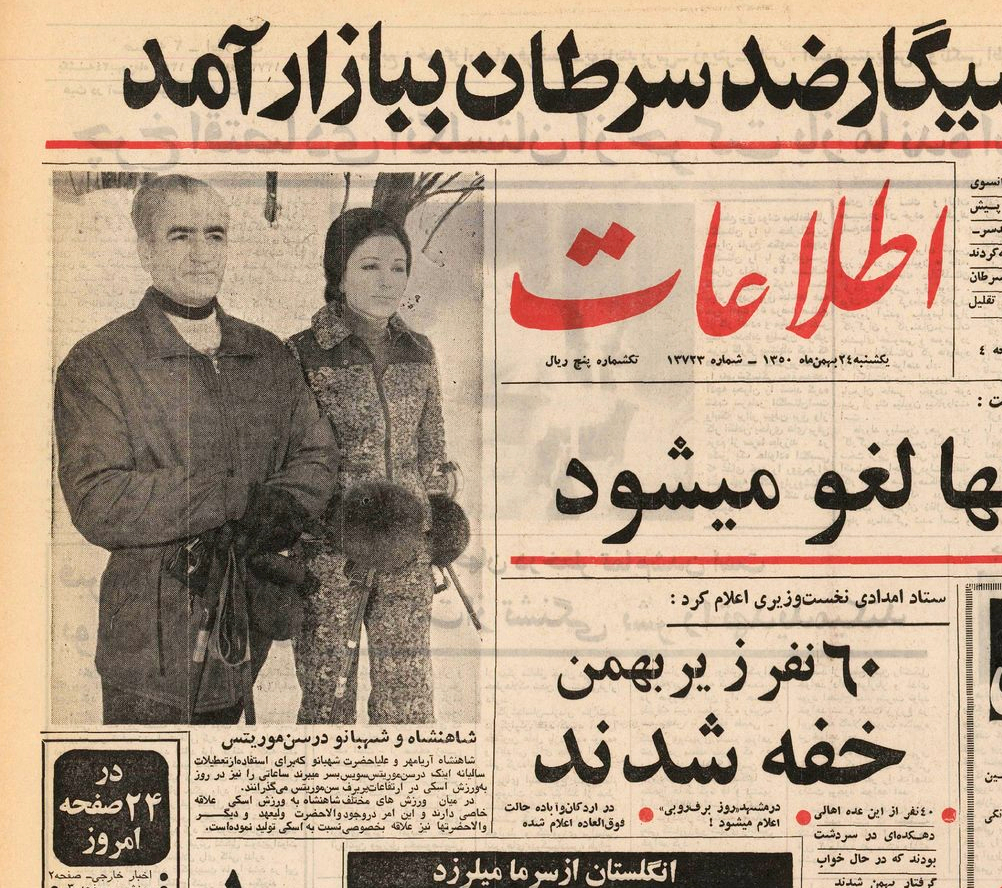
A portion of the Etella'at news paper first page published on 13 February 1972 during the 1972 Iran blizzard. The titles include "60 people suffocated under snow", referring to the 1972 Iran blizzard, and "King and Queen in Saint Moritz".

A series of snowstorms at the end of January had already accumulated over western Iran. Passing from Azerbaijan to Iran between February 3 and 8, the blizzard left up to 8 metres (26 ft) of snow. The wind and snow resulted in damage to trees, power lines, railways, roads, cars and entire villages.

At the height of the storm, authorities estimated that a region including all of western Iran was beneath the snow for a week. The supply of food and medicine was exhausted and the temperature plummeted to −25 °C (−13 °F), which rendered the survival of the snowstorm's victims uncertain. Furthermore, a flu epidemic had begun to hit rural areas at the start of winter, already claiming several lives.

The snowstorm cut off connectivity to hundreds of villages in Azerbaijan; 20 buses transporting people became trapped on both sides of Heyran mountain pass and a bus carrying 30 passengers crashed in the Heyran mountain pass, killing all of its passengers. Troops of the Soviet Army arrived too late to rescue the Soviet citizens who had been trapped. Avalanches landed on the Chalus road, and power was cut off at Anzali port. Hundreds of passengers and drivers were trapped on the roadways, and the country's main roads and Azerbaijan's train were stopped. Some individuals in Tabriz fainted from the cold. Foreign jet pilots did not dare to land at Mehrabad, and the citizens of Hamadan were trapped in their homes. Schools in 15 cities were all closed, as were numerous other events that made news.

On February 9, during a 24-hour lull, rescue helicopters were able to reach part of the region. Where there were villages, first-aid workers found large snowdrifts; when dug up, frozen corpses were often uncovered. In the village of Sheklab, they recovered 18 bodies before another blizzard struck on February 11. The rescue workers were forced to evacuate.

Army helicopters left behind two tons of provisions in the form of bread and dates, scattered on snowdrifts around villages. This was done in the hope that the inhabitants could resupply themselves if they were able to dig a tunnel out of their locations. However, few people were able to benefit from this. Out of Sheklab's 100 inhabitants, no one survived.

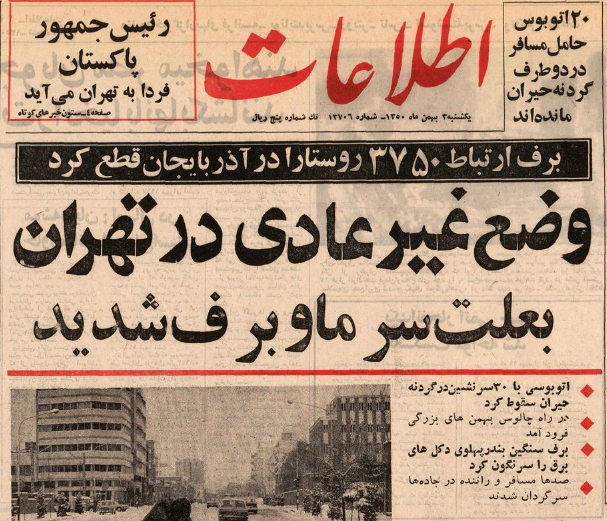
A portion of the Etella'at newspaper's first page published on 23 January 1972 during the 1972 Iran blizzard, the deadliest blizzard in the history. Some of the titles read: "Unusual conditions in Tehran due to heavy snows and cold" and "The snow cut the connection between 3750 villages in Azerbaijan province."

== See also ==
- Geography of Iran
- International rankings of Iran
- List of earthquakes in Iran
- List of natural disasters by death toll
