= Komehr =

Village in Fars province, Iran

Komehr Persian: كمهر
- Village
- Location within Iran
- Coordinates: 30°26′48″N 51°52′37″E
- Country: Iran
- Province: Fars
- County: Sepidan
- District: Central
- Rural District: Komehr

Population (2016)
  - Total: 1,583
- Time zone: UTC+3:30 (IRST)

Komehr (Persian: كمهر) (Note: Also known as Kūmehr) is a village in, and the capital of, Komehr Rural District of the Central District of Sepidan County, Fars province, Iran.

== History ==
The village was buried, leaving no survivors, during the 1972 Iran blizzard.

== Demographics ==
=== Population ===
At the time of the 2006 National Census, the village's population was 1,722 in 379 households. The following census in 2011 counted 1,759 people in 477 households. The 2016 census measured the population of the village as 1,583 people in 450 households. It was the most populous village in its rural district.
