= Shaklabad =

Shaklabad شكل اباد
- Village
- Location within Iran
- Coordinates: 37°15′24″N 44°51′17″E
- Country: Iran
- Province: West Azerbaijan
- County: Urmia
- Bakhsh: Silvaneh
- Rural District: Margavar

Population (2006)
  - Total: 437
- Time zone: UTC+3:30 (IRST)
  - Summer (DST): UTC+4:30 (IRDT)

Shaklabad (Persian: شكل اباد, also Romanized as Shaklābād; in Armenian: Շըխրաբադ) is a village in Margavar Rural District, Silvaneh District, Urmia County, West Azerbaijan Province, Iran. At the 2006 census, its population was 437, in 68 families.
