= Komehr Rural District =

Rural district in Fars province, Iran

Komehr Rural District Persian: دهستان كمهر
- Rural District
- Location within Iran
- Coordinates: 30°28′50″N 51°56′16″E
- Country: Iran
- Province: Fars
- County: Sepidan
- District: Central
- Capital: Komehr

Population (2016)
  - Total: 3,363
- Time zone: UTC+3:30 (IRST)

Komehr Rural District (Persian: دهستان كمهر) is in the Central District of Sepidan County, Fars province, Iran. Its capital is the village of Komehr.

== Demographics ==
=== Population ===
At the time of the 2006 National Census, the rural district's population was 3,812 in 853 households. There were 3,849 inhabitants in 1,107 households at the following census of 2011. The 2016 census measured the population of the rural district as 3,363 in 963 households. The most populous of its 17 villages was Komehr, with 1,583 people.
