= Rask =

Rask may refer to:

== Places in Iran ==
- Rask, Bardsir, a village in Kerman province
- Rask, Qaleh Ganj, a village in Kerman province
- Rask, Iran, a city in Sistan and Baluchestan province
- Rask County, an administrative division of Sistan and Baluchestan province
- Rask-i-Du or Rashk-e Olya, a village in Kuhbanan County, Kerman province
- Rask-i-Sar or Rashk-e Sofla, a village in Kuhbanan County, Kerman province

== Other uses ==
- HNoMS Rask, two Royal Norwegian Navy patrol boats
- Rask (surname)

== See also ==
- Rashk (disambiguation)
