= Rashk =

Rashk (Persian: راشك or رشك) may refer to:

- Rashk-e Olya, Fars, Fars Province
- Rashk-e Sofla, Fars, Fars Province
- Rashk, Hormozgan
- Rashk-e Olya, Kerman, Kerman Province
- Rashk-e Sofla, Kerman, Kerman Province
- Rashk-e Vosta, Kerman Province
- Rashk, Khuzestan
- Rashk, Sistan and Baluchestan

== See also ==
- Rashg (disambiguation)
