= Dar Kham =

Dar Kham درخم
- Village
- Location within Iran
- Coordinates: 31°31′48″N 56°12′00″E
- Country: Iran
- Province: Kerman
- County: Kuhbanan
- Bakhsh: Central
- Rural District: Khorramdasht

Population (2006)
  - Total: 14
- Time zone: UTC+3:30 (IRST)
  - Summer (DST): UTC+4:30 (IRDT)

Dar Kham (Persian: درخم) is a village in Khorramdasht Rural District, in the Central District of Kuhbanan County, Kerman Province, Iran. At the 2006 census, its population was 14, in 5 families.
