= Hoseynabad-e Chahar =

Hoseynabad-e Chahar حسين اباد4
- Village
- Location within Iran
- Coordinates: 31°36′15″N 56°10′08″E
- Country: Iran
- Province: Kerman
- County: Kuhbanan
- Bakhsh: Central
- Rural District: Javar
- Time zone: UTC+3:30 (IRST)
  - Summer (DST): UTC+4:30 (IRDT)

Hoseynabad-e Chahar (Persian: حسين اباد4, also Romanized as Ḩoseynābād-e Chahar; also known as Ḩoseynābād) is a village in Javar Rural District in the Central District of Kuhbanan County, Kerman Province, Iran. It appeared in the 2006 census but its population was not reported.
