= Moghisabad =

Moghisabad مغيث اباد
- Village
- Location within Iran
- Coordinates: 31°01′35″N 56°12′34″E
- Country: Iran
- Province: Kerman
- County: Kuhbanan
- Bakhsh: Toghrol Al Jerd
- Rural District: Shaab Jereh

Population (2006)
  - Total: 20
- Time zone: UTC+3:30 (IRST)
  - Summer (DST): UTC+4:30 (IRDT)

Moghisabad (Persian: مغيث اباد, also Romanized as Moghīs̄ābād; also known as Sheyūr and Sheyvar) is a village in Shaab Jereh Rural District, Toghrol Al Jerd District, Kuhbanan County, Kerman Province, Iran. At the 2006 census, its population was 20, in 6 families.
