= Dar Ab, Javar =

Dar Ab دراب
- Village
- Location within Iran
- Coordinates: 31°33′00″N 56°16′00″E
- Country: Iran
- Province: Kerman
- County: Kuhbanan
- Bakhsh: Central
- Rural District: Javar

Population (2006)
  - Total: 24
- Time zone: UTC+3:30 (IRST)
  - Summer (DST): UTC+4:30 (IRDT)

Dar Ab (Persian: دراب, also Romanized as Dar Āb; also known as Dar Āb-e Shengūn) is a village in Javar Rural District, in the Central District of Kuhbanan County, Kerman Province, Iran. At the 2006 census, its population was 24, in 5 families.
