= Deh-e Shur Akhund =

Deh-e Shur ده شوراخوند
- Village
- Location within Iran
- Coordinates: 31°22′45″N 56°17′59″E
- Country: Iran
- Province: Kerman
- County: Kuhbanan
- Bakhsh: Central
- Rural District: Javar

Population (2006)
  - Total: 25
- Time zone: UTC+3:30 (IRST)
  - Summer (DST): UTC+4:30 (IRDT)

Deh-e Shur (Persian: ده شوراخوند, also Romanized as Deh-e Shūr Ākhūnd; also known as Deh-e Shūr, Deh Shīr, and Deh Shūr) is a village in Javar Rural District, in the Central District of Kuhbanan County, Kerman Province, Iran. At the 2006 census, its population was 25, in 9 families.
