= Shekarabad, Kuhbanan =

Shekarabad شكراباد
- Village
- Location within Iran
- Coordinates: 31°26′17″N 56°07′25″E
- Country: Iran
- Province: Kerman
- County: Kuhbanan
- Bakhsh: Central
- Rural District: Khorramdasht

Population (2006)
  - Total: 90
- Time zone: UTC+3:30 (IRST)
  - Summer (DST): UTC+4:30 (IRDT)

Shekarabad (Persian: شكراباد, also Romanized as Shekarābād and Shokrābād) is a village in Khorramdasht Rural District, in the Central District of Kuhbanan County, Kerman Province, Iran. At the 2006 census, its population was 90, in 26 families.
