= Bab Abdan =

Bab Abdan باب عبدان
- Village
- Location within Iran
- Coordinates: 31°03′00″N 56°29′56″E
- Country: Iran
- Province: Kerman
- County: Kuhbanan
- Bakhsh: Toghrol Al Jerd
- Rural District: Toghrol Al Jerd

Population (2006)
  - Total: 182
- Time zone: UTC+3:30 (IRST)
  - Summer (DST): UTC+4:30 (IRDT)

Bab Abdan (Persian: باب عبدان, also Romanized as Bāb ‘Abdān) is a village in Toghrol Al Jerd Rural District, Toghrol Al Jerd District, Kuhbanan County, Kerman Province, Iran. At the 2006 census, its population was 182, in 46 families.
