= Kahan, Kuhbanan =

Kahan كهن
- Village
- Location within Iran
- Coordinates: 31°30′00″N 56°09′00″E
- Country: Iran
- Province: Kerman
- County: Kuhbanan
- Bakhsh: Central
- Rural District: Khorramdasht

Population (2006)
  - Total: 190
- Time zone: UTC+3:30 (IRST)
  - Summer (DST): UTC+4:30 (IRDT)

Kahan (Persian: كهن) is a village in Khorramdasht Rural District, in the Central District of Kuhbanan County, Kerman Province, Iran.

Kahn is one of the coldest places in Kerman. At the 2006 census, its population was 190, in 59 families.
