= Darreh-ye Hud =

Darreh-ye Hud دره هود
- Village
- Location within Iran
- Coordinates: 31°29′23″N 56°14′22″E
- Country: Iran
- Province: Kerman
- County: Kuhbanan
- Bakhsh: Central
- Rural District: Javar

Population (2006)
  - Total: 23
- Time zone: UTC+3:30 (IRST)
  - Summer (DST): UTC+4:30 (IRDT)

Darreh-ye Hud (Persian: دره هود, also Romanized as Darreh-ye Hūd; also known as Dar-e Hūd and Dar Hūk) is a village in Javar Rural District, in the Central District of Kuhbanan County, Kerman Province, Iran. At the 2006 census, its population was 23, in 8 families.
