= Deh-e Now-e Kahan =

Deh-e Now-e Kahan دهنوكهن
- Village
- Location within Iran
- Coordinates: 31°29′45″N 55°57′25″E
- Country: Iran
- Province: Kerman
- County: Kuhbanan
- Bakhsh: Central
- Rural District: Khorramdasht

Population (2006)
  - Total: 11
- Time zone: UTC+3:30 (IRST)
  - Summer (DST): UTC+4:30 (IRDT)

Deh-e Now-e Kahan (Persian: دهنوكهن; also known as Deh-e Now and Deh Now’īyeh) is a village in Khorramdasht Rural District, in the Central District of Kuhbanan County, Kerman Province, Iran. At the 2006 census, its population was 11, in 4 families.
