= Karevangah =

Karevangah كاروانگاه
- Village
- Location within Iran
- Coordinates: 31°32′47″N 56°18′58″E
- Country: Iran
- Province: Kerman
- County: Kuhbanan
- Bakhsh: Central
- Rural District: Javar

Population (2006)
  - Total: 65
- Time zone: UTC+3:30 (IRST)
  - Summer (DST): UTC+4:30 (IRDT)

Karevangah (Persian: كاروانگاه, also Romanized as Kārevāngāh) is a village in Javar Rural District, in the Central District of Kuhbanan County, Kerman Province, Iran. At the 2006 census, its population was 65, in 21 families.
