= Bidan-e Khvajeh =

Bidan-e Khvajeh بيدان خواجه
- Village
- Location within Iran
- Coordinates: 31°30′00″N 56°10′00″E
- Country: Iran
- Province: Kerman
- County: Kuhbanan
- Bakhsh: Central
- Rural District: Khorramdasht

Population (2006)
  - Total: 77
- Time zone: UTC+3:30 (IRST)
  - Summer (DST): UTC+4:30 (IRDT)

Bidan-e Khvajeh (Persian: بيدان خواجه, also Romanized as Bīdān-e Khvājeh; also known as Bidan, Bīdan-e Khvājeh Ra’īs, and Bidan Khvajeh Ra’is) is a village in Khorramdasht Rural District, in the Central District of Kuhbanan County, Kerman Province, Iran. At the 2006 census, its population was 77, in 22 families.
