= Estaj =

Estaj (Persian: استاج), also rendered as Estach, may refer to:

- Estaj, Kerman
- Estaj, Mashhad, Razavi Khorasan Province
- Estaj, Sabzevar, Razavi Khorasan Province
- Estaj, Yazd
