= Deh Shib =

Deh Shib or Deh-e Shib or Dehshib (Persian: ده شيب) may refer to:

- Deh Shib, Fars
- Deh Shib, Fasa, Fars Province
- Deh-e Shib, Kuhbanan, Kerman Province
- Deh-e Shib, Ravar, Kerman Province
- Deh Shib, Razavi Khorasan
- Deh Shib, South Khorasan
