= Fathabad, Kuhbanan =

Fathabad فتح اباد
- Village
- Location within Iran
- Coordinates: 31°20′31″N 56°00′52″E
- Country: Iran
- Province: Kerman
- County: Kuhbanan
- Bakhsh: Central
- Rural District: Khorramdasht

Population (2006)
  - Total: 120
- Time zone: UTC+3:30 (IRST)
  - Summer (DST): UTC+4:30 (IRDT)

Fathabad (Persian: فتح اباد, also Romanized as Fatḩābād) is a village in Khorramdasht Rural District, in the Central District of Kuhbanan County, Kerman Province, Iran. At the 2006 census, its population was 120, in 28 families.
