= Kamukhoshk =

Kamukhoshk كموخشك
- Village
- Location within Iran
- Coordinates: 31°30′00″N 56°18′00″E
- Country: Iran
- Province: Kerman
- County: Kuhbanan
- Bakhsh: Central
- Rural District: Javar

Population (2006)
  - Total: 71
- Time zone: UTC+3:30 (IRST)
  - Summer (DST): UTC+4:30 (IRDT)

Kamukhoshk (Persian: كموخشك, also Romanized as Kamūkhoshk) is a village in Javar Rural District, in the Central District of Kuhbanan County, Kerman Province, Iran. At the 2006 census, its population was 71, in 16 families.
