= Garakuiyeh =

Garakuiyeh گراكوييه
- Village
- Location within Iran
- Coordinates: 31°25′53″N 56°08′04″E
- Country: Iran
- Province: Kerman
- County: Kuhbanan
- Bakhsh: Central
- Rural District: Khorramdasht

Population (2006)
  - Total: 50
- Time zone: UTC+3:30 (IRST)
  - Summer (DST): UTC+4:30 (IRDT)

Garakuiyeh (Persian: گراكوييه, also Romanized as Garākū’īyeh; also known as Gāzerū’īyeh) is a village in Khorramdasht Rural District, in the Central District of Kuhbanan County, Kerman Province, Iran. At the 2006 census, its population was 50, in 13 families.
