= Fidkuiyeh =

Fidkuiyeh فيدكوئيه
- Village
- Location within Iran
- Coordinates: 31°27′31″N 56°11′17″E
- Country: Iran
- Province: Kerman
- County: Kuhbanan
- Bakhsh: Central
- Rural District: Khorramdasht

Population (2006)
  - Total: 27
- Time zone: UTC+3:30 (IRST)
  - Summer (DST): UTC+4:30 (IRDT)

Fidkuiyeh (Persian: فيدكوئيه, also Romanized as Fīdkū’īyeh and Fīd Kū’īyeh; also known as Bīd Kū”īyeh and Fītkū’īyeh) is a village in Khorramdasht Rural District, in the Central District of Kuhbanan County, Kerman Province, Iran. At the 2006 census, its population was 27, in 12 families.
