= Titu-ye Pain =

Titu-ye Pain تيتوپائين
- Village
- Location within Iran
- Coordinates: 31°31′56″N 56°17′38″E
- Country: Iran
- Province: Kerman
- County: Kuhbanan
- Bakhsh: Central
- Rural District: Javar

Population (2006)
  - Total: 35
- Time zone: UTC+3:30 (IRST)
  - Summer (DST): UTC+4:30 (IRDT)

Titu-ye Pain (Persian: تيتوپائين, also Romanized as Tītū-ye Pā’īn) is a village in Javar Rural District, in the Central District of Kuhbanan County, Kerman Province, Iran. At the 2006 census, its population was 35, in 9 families.
