= Deh Now-e Qalandar =

Deh Now-e Qalandar دهنوقلندر
- Village
- Location within Iran
- Coordinates: 31°28′45″N 56°20′13″E
- Country: Iran
- Province: Kerman
- County: Kuhbanan
- Bakhsh: Central
- Rural District: Javar

Population (2006)
  - Total: 19
- Time zone: UTC+3:30 (IRST)
  - Summer (DST): UTC+4:30 (IRDT)

Deh Now-e Qalandar (Persian: دهنوقلندر; also known as Deh Now) is a village in Javar Rural District, in the Central District of Kuhbanan County, Kerman Province, Iran. At the 2006 census, its population was 19, in 6 families.
