= Hezargaz =

Hezargaz هزارگز
- Village
- Location within Iran
- Coordinates: 31°05′08″N 56°25′24″E
- Country: Iran
- Province: Kerman
- County: Kuhbanan
- Bakhsh: Toghrol Al Jerd
- Rural District: Toghrol Al Jerd

Population (2006)
  - Total: 21
- Time zone: UTC+3:30 (IRST)
  - Summer (DST): UTC+4:30 (IRDT)

Hezargaz (Persian: هزارگز, also Romanized as Hezārgaz) is a village in Toghrol Al Jerd Rural District, Toghrol Al Jerd District, Kuhbanan County, Kerman Province, Iran. At the 2006 census, its population was 21, in 6 families.
