= Ab Korik =

Ab Korik ابكريك
- Village
- Location within Iran
- Coordinates: 31°31′29″N 56°16′49″E
- Country: Iran
- Province: Kerman
- County: Kuhbanan
- Bakhsh: Central
- Rural District: Javar

Population (2006)
  - Total: 21
- Time zone: UTC+3:30 (IRST)
  - Summer (DST): UTC+4:30 (IRDT)

Ab Korik (Persian: ابكريك, also Romanized as Āb Korīk and Ābkorīk) is a village in Javar Rural District, located in Central District of Kuhbanan County, Kerman Province, Iran. According to the 2006 census, its population was 21, consisting of 5 families.
