= Gitari =

Gitari گيتري
- Village
- Location within Iran
- Coordinates: 31°31′18″N 56°18′55″E
- Country: Iran
- Province: Kerman
- County: Kuhbanan
- Bakhsh: Central
- Rural District: Javar

Population (2006)
  - Total: 178
- Time zone: UTC+3:30 (IRST)
  - Summer (DST): UTC+4:30 (IRDT)

Gitari (Persian: گيتري, also Romanized as Gītarī and Gītrī) is a village in Javar Rural District, in the Central District of Kuhbanan County, Kerman Province, Iran. At the 2006 census, its population was 178, in 43 families.
