= Ratk =

Ratk رتك
- Village
- Location within Iran
- Coordinates: 31°29′00″N 56°02′29″E
- Country: Iran
- Province: Kerman
- County: Kuhbanan
- Bakhsh: Central
- Rural District: Khorramdasht

Population (2006)
  - Total: 121
- Time zone: UTC+3:30 (IRST)
  - Summer (DST): UTC+4:30 (IRDT)

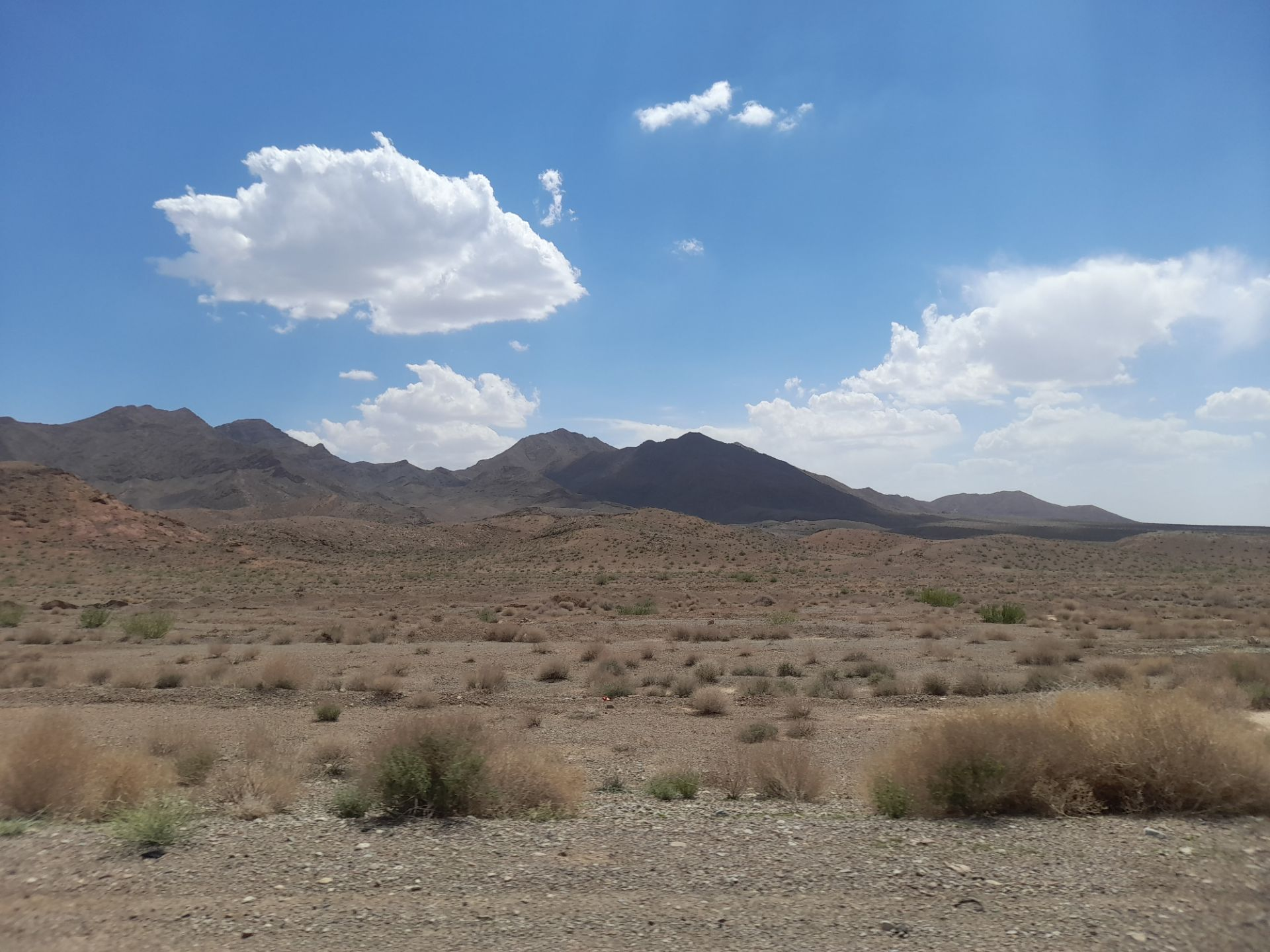

Ratk (Persian: رتك, also Romanized as Rotak) is a village in Khorramdasht Rural District, in the Central District of Kuhbanan County, Kerman Province, Iran. At the 2006 census, its population was 121, in 46 families.
