= Gaz Kohan =

Gaz Kohan گازكهن
- Village
- Location within Iran
- Coordinates: 31°28′01″N 56°20′59″E
- Country: Iran
- Province: Kerman
- County: Kuhbanan
- Bakhsh: Central
- Rural District: Javar

Population (2006)
  - Total: 40
- Time zone: UTC+3:30 (IRST)
  - Summer (DST): UTC+4:30 (IRDT)

Gaz Kohan (Persian: گازكهن, also romanized as Gāz Kohan, Gāz Kahan, and Gāz Kahn) is a village in Javar Rural District, in the Central District of Kuhbanan County, Kerman Province, Iran. At the 2006 census, its population was 40, with 11 families.
