= Rezaviyeh =

Rezaviyeh or Razuyeh or Razaviyeh or Razavieh (Persian: رضويه) may refer to:

- Razaviyeh, a city in Razavi Khorasan Province
- Razuyeh, Gonabad, Razavi Khorasan
- Razaviyeh, Kerman
- Razaviyeh, Kuhbanan, Kerman Province
- Rezaviyeh, South Khorasan
- Razaviyeh-ye Abkhvorak, South Khorasan Province
- Razaviyeh District, in Razavi Khorasan Province
