= Shurak-e Vosta =

Shurak-e Vosta شورك وسطي
- Village
- Location within Iran
- Coordinates: 31°24′55″N 56°25′00″E
- Country: Iran
- Province: Kerman
- County: Kuhbanan
- Bakhsh: Central
- Rural District: Javar

Population (2006)
  - Total: 7
- Time zone: UTC+3:30 (IRST)
  - Summer (DST): UTC+4:30 (IRDT)

Shurak-e Vosta (Persian: شورك وسطي, also Romanized as Shūrak-e Vosţá; also known as Shūrak-e Mīān, Shūrak-e Vasaţ, Shūrk-e Mīān, and Sūrk Vasati) is a village in Javar Rural District, in the Central District of Kuhbanan County, Kerman Province, Iran. At the 2006 census, its population was 7, in 4 families.
