= Deh-e Ali, Kuhbanan =

Deh-e Ali ده علي
- Village
- Location within Iran
- Coordinates: 31°40′49″N 56°12′08″E
- Country: Iran
- Province: Kerman
- County: Kuhbanan
- Bakhsh: Central
- Rural District: Javar

Population (2006)
  - Total: 13
- Time zone: UTC+3:30 (IRST)
  - Summer (DST): UTC+4:30 (IRDT)

Deh-e Ali (Persian: ده علي, also Romanized as Deh-e ‘Alī and Deh ‘Alī) is a village in Javar Rural District, in the Central District of Kuhbanan County, Kerman Province, Iran. At the 2006 census, its population was 13, in 5 families.
