= Sebotk =

Sabotk سبتك
- Village
- Location within Iran
- Coordinates: 31°05′44″N 56°26′18″E
- Country: Iran
- Province: Kerman
- County: Kuhbanan
- Bakhsh: Toghrol Al Jerd
- Rural District: Toghrol Al Jerd

Population (2006)
  - Total: 119
- Time zone: UTC+3:30 (IRST)
  - Summer (DST): UTC+4:30 (IRDT)

Sebotk (Persian: سبتك; also known as Seh Botk) is a village in Toghrol Al Jerd Rural District, Toghrol Al Jerd District, Kuhbanan County, Kerman Province, Iran. At the 2006 census, its population was 119, in 30 families.
