= Afzad =

Afzad افزاد
- Village
- Location within Iran
- Coordinates: 31°26′46″N 56°15′08″E
- Country: Iran
- Province: Kerman
- County: Kuhbanan
- Bakhsh: Central
- Rural District: Javar

Population (2006)
  - Total: 217
- Time zone: UTC+3:30 (IRST)
  - Summer (DST): UTC+4:30 (IRDT)

Afzad (Persian: افزاد, also Romanized as Afzād; also known as Abzāt, Afzād, Afzāţ, and Āhzād) is a village in Javar Rural District, in the Central District of Kuhbanan County, Kerman Province, Iran. At the 2006 census, its population was 217, in 69 families.
