= Deh-e Seyyedha =

Deh-e Seyyedha ده سيدها
- Village
- Location within Iran
- Coordinates: 31°26′36″N 56°21′30″E
- Country: Iran
- Province: Kerman
- County: Kuhbanan
- Bakhsh: Central
- Rural District: Javar

Population (2006)
  - Total: 23
- Time zone: UTC+3:30 (IRST)
  - Summer (DST): UTC+4:30 (IRDT)

Deh-e Seyyedha (Persian: ده سيدها, also Romanized as Deh-e Seyyedhā; also known as Dehseyyedā) is a village in Javar Rural District, in the Central District of Kuhbanan County, Kerman Province, Iran. At the 2006 census, its population was 23, in 5 families.
