= Deh-e Khvajeh, Kuhbanan =

Deh-e Khvajeh ده خواجه
- Village
- Location within Iran
- Coordinates: 31°26′20″N 56°15′23″E
- Country: Iran
- Province: Kerman
- County: Kuhbanan
- Bakhsh: Central
- Rural District: Javar

Population (2006)
  - Total: 67
- Time zone: UTC+3:30 (IRST)
  - Summer (DST): UTC+4:30 (IRDT)

Deh-e Khvajeh (Persian: ده خواجه, also Romanized as Deh-e Khvājeh and Deh Khvājeh) is a village in Javar Rural District, in the Central District of Kuhbanan County, Kerman Province, Iran. At the 2006 census, its population was 67, in 19 families.
