= Khanmakan =

Village in Kerman province, Iran

Khanmakan Persian: خانمكان
- Village
- Location within Iran
- Coordinates: 31°07′34″N 56°25′09″E
- Country: Iran
- Province: Kerman
- County: Kuhbanan
- District: Toghrol ol Jerd
- Rural District: Toghrol ol Jerd

Population (2016)
  - Total: 454
- Time zone: UTC+3:30 (IRST)

Khanmakan (Persian: خانمكان) (Note: Also romanized as Khānmakān; also known as Jannat Makān (جنت مكان), Khvāh Makān, and Khvān Makān) is a village in Toghrol ol Jerd Rural District, Toghrol ol Jerd District, Kuhbanan County, Kerman province, Iran.

== Demographics ==
=== Population ===
At the time of the 2006 National Census, the village's population was 238 in 58 households. The following census in 2011 counted 307 people in 86 households. The 2016 census measured the population of the village as 454 people in 129 households. It was the most populous village in its rural district.
