= Givaran, Kerman =

Givaran گيوران
- Village
- Location within Iran
- Coordinates: 31°09′31″N 56°04′31″E
- Country: Iran
- Province: Kerman
- County: Kuhbanan
- Bakhsh: Toghrol Al Jerd
- Rural District: Shaab Jereh

Population (2006)
  - Total: 16
- Time zone: UTC+3:30 (IRST)
  - Summer (DST): UTC+4:30 (IRDT)

Givaran (Persian: گيوران, also Romanized as Gīvarān; also known as Gīvmarān) is a village in Shaab Jereh Rural District, Toghrol Al Jerd District, Kuhbanan County, Kerman Province, Iran. At the 2006 census, its population was 16, in 4 families.
