= Deh-e Shib, Kuhbanan =

Deh-e Shib ده شيب
- Village
- Location within Iran
- Coordinates: 31°27′10″N 56°11′11″E
- Country: Iran
- Province: Kerman
- County: Kuhbanan
- Bakhsh: Central
- Rural District: Khorramdasht

Population (2006)
  - Total: 17
- Time zone: UTC+3:30 (IRST)
  - Summer (DST): UTC+4:30 (IRDT)

Deh-e Shib (Persian: ده شيب, also Romanized as Deh-e Shīb and Dehshīb) is a village in Khorramdasht Rural District, in the Central District of Kuhbanan County, Kerman Province, Iran. At the 2006 census, its population was 17, in 4 families.

== Tourism, Demographic, and Service Information of Deh Sheib Village ==
The natural landscape of Deh Sheib village in Khorramdast Rural District is mountainous, with valleys and hills. The village is accessible via a gravel road.

According to the 2011 census by the Statistical Center of Iran, the village has a total population of 27, comprising 15 men and 12 women. There are 9 households and 4 residential units in the village.

Regarding amenities, the village has the following features:

| The facility | availability |
|---|---|
| Sports field | No |
| Sports hall | No |
| Mosque | No |
| Imamzadeh shrine | No |
| National electricity grid | Yes |
| Diesel generator | No |
| Renewable energy (solar, wind, etc.) | No |
| Piped gas | No |
| Piped water | No |
| Public bathhouse | Yes |
| Public internet access | No |
| Access to public transportation | No |
| Grocery store | No |
| Bakery | NO |
