= Rizuiyeh =

Rizuiyeh ريزوئيه
- Village
- Location within Iran
- Coordinates: 31°05′34″N 56°17′18″E
- Country: Iran
- Province: Kerman
- County: Kuhbanan
- Bakhsh: Toghrol Al Jerd
- Rural District: Shaab Jereh

Population (2006)
  - Total: 45
- Time zone: UTC+3:30 (IRST)
  - Summer (DST): UTC+4:30 (IRDT)

Rizuiyeh (Persian: ريزوئيه, also Romanized as Rīzū’īyeh and Rizoo’eyeh; also known as Nīrū’īyeh, Razaviyeh, Rezu, Rīzū, and Tūkh Rāja) is a village in Shaab Jereh Rural District, Toghrol Al Jerd District, Kuhbanan County, Kerman Province, Iran. At the 2006 census, its population was 45, in 13 families.
