= Qaryeh Ali =

Village in Kerman province, Iran

Qaryeh Ali Persian: قريه علي
- Village
- Location within Iran
- Coordinates: 31°26′28″N 56°00′47″E
- Country: Iran
- Province: Kerman
- County: Kuhbanan
- District: Central
- Rural District: Khorramdasht

Population (2016)
  - Total: 902
- Time zone: UTC+3:30 (IRST)

Qaryeh Ali (Persian: قريه علي) (Note: Also romanized as Qaryeh ‘Alī; also known as Moḩammadābād, Muhammadābād, Deh-e Ali, and Khorramdasht) is a village in, and the capital of, Khorramdasht Rural District of the Central District of Kuhbanan County, Kerman province, Iran.

== Demographics ==
=== Population ===
At the time of the 2006 National Census, the village's population was 828 in 237 households. The following census in 2011 counted 922 people in 300 households. The 2016 census measured the population of the village as 902 people in 321 households. It was the most populous village in its rural district.
