= Gavar, Kerman =

Village in Kerman province, Iran

Gavar Persian: گور
- Village
- Location within Iran
- Coordinates: 31°21′37″N 56°16′51″E
- Country: Iran
- Province: Kerman
- County: Kuhbanan
- District: Central
- Rural District: Javar

Population (2016)
  - Total: 1,508
- Time zone: UTC+3:30 (IRST)

Gavar (Persian: گور) (Note: Also known as Jevar, Jowr, and Jūr) is a village in Javar Rural District of the Central District of Kuhbanan County, Kerman province, Iran.

== Demographics ==
=== Population ===
At the time of the 2006 National Census, the village's population was 1,519 in 418 households. The following census in 2011 counted 1,679 people in 494 households. The 2016 census measured the population of the village as 1,508 people in 474 households. It was the most populous village in its rural district.
