= Rashk-e Vosta =

Rashk-e Vosta رشك وسطي
- Village
- Location within Iran
- Coordinates: 31°04′10″N 56°27′33″E
- Country: Iran
- Province: Kerman
- County: Kuhbanan
- Bakhsh: Toghrol Al Jerd
- Rural District: Toghrol Al Jerd

Population (2006)
  - Total: 197
- Time zone: UTC+3:30 (IRST)
  - Summer (DST): UTC+4:30 (IRDT)

Rashk-e Vosta (Persian: رشك وسطي, also Romanized as Rashk-e Vosţá; also known as Rashk-e Mīān and Rashk-e Vasaţ) is a village in Toghrol Al Jerd Rural District, Toghrol Al Jerd District, Kuhbanan County, Kerman Province, Iran. At the 2006 census, its population was 197, in 51 families.
