= Rashk-e Sofla =

Rashk-e Sofla or Rashk Sofla (Persian: راشک‌سفلی or رشک سفلی) may refer to:

- Rashk-e Sofla, Fars (راشک‌سفلی - Rāshk-e Soflá)
- Rashk-e Sofla, Kerman (رشک سفلی - Rashk-e Soflá)
