= Sabluiyeh, Kuhbanan =

Sabluiyeh سبلوييه
- Village
- Location within Iran
- Coordinates: 31°30′33″N 56°10′02″E
- Country: Iran
- Province: Kerman
- County: Kuhbanan
- Bakhsh: Central
- Rural District: Khorramdasht

Population (2006)
  - Total: 15
- Time zone: UTC+3:30 (IRST)
  - Summer (DST): UTC+4:30 (IRDT)

Sabluiyeh (Persian: سبلوييه, also Romanized as Sablū’īyeh, S̄ablū’īyeh, and S̄eblū’īyeh) is a village in Khorramdasht Rural District, in the Central District of Kuhbanan County, Kerman Province, Iran. At the 2006 census, its population was 15, in 5 families.
