= Shaab Jereh =

Village in Kerman province, Iran

Shaab Jereh Persian: شعب جره
- Village
- Location within Iran
- Coordinates: 31°02′47″N 56°12′25″E
- Country: Iran
- Province: Kerman
- County: Zarand
- District: Yazdanabad
- Rural District: Shaab Jereh

Population (2016)
  - Total: 1,883
- Time zone: UTC+3:30 (IRST)

(Persian: شعب جره) (Note: Also romanized as Sha‘ab Jereh; also known as Shabjereh) is a village and capital of Shaab Jereh Rural District of Yazdanabad District, Zarand County, Kerman, Iran.

== Demographics ==
=== Population ===
In the 2006 National Census, its population was 1,689 in 437 households, when it was part of Toghrol ol Jerd District of Kuhbanan County. The 2011 census recorded 1,723 people in 531 households. By this time, the rural district had been transferred from Kuhbanan County to Yazdanabad District of Zarand County. The 2016 census recorded a population of 1,883 people in 594 households. It was the most populous village in its rural district.
