= Toghrol Al Jerd =

Toghrol Al Jerd (Persian: طغرالجرد) may refer to:

- Toghrol Al Jerd District
- Toghrol Al Jerd Rural District
