= Chul fair =

Chul fair is held at Gangardi of Garbada taluka and Raniyar village of Zhalod taluka. Tribal members of Panchmahal, Bharuch and Vadodara districts also enjoy Chul fair.

== Time ==
The Chul fair is held in March, on Dhuleti (the second day of Holi). .

== Events ==
Attendees gather at the fair before noon. Its specialty is that it is prepared by digging a pit one foot wide and five to six feet long. Large pieces (coals) of acacia wood etc. are burnt and embers are made.

According to News Plus Gujarati, "The Chul fair is not just about entertainment and refreshment, religious beliefs also associated with the Chul fair."

Tribal people walk barefoot on the burning embers seven times from one end to the other carrying a coconut and a jug of water. Then the coconut is sacrificed by bowing to Agnidev. People keep Votive of Agnidev for the protection of their children and animals.

Some men and young boys rub turmeric on their bodies. They apply collyrium on their eyes and black dots on their cheeks. Women bring their babies in short sleeved yellow or green blouses and red Odhni (dupatta or chunni). Men, women and children dance to the beat of drums with swords and sticks in their hands.
