= Kohneh Castle, Shaab Jereh =

Castle in Kerman Province, Iran

Kohneh Castle
- قلعه کهنه
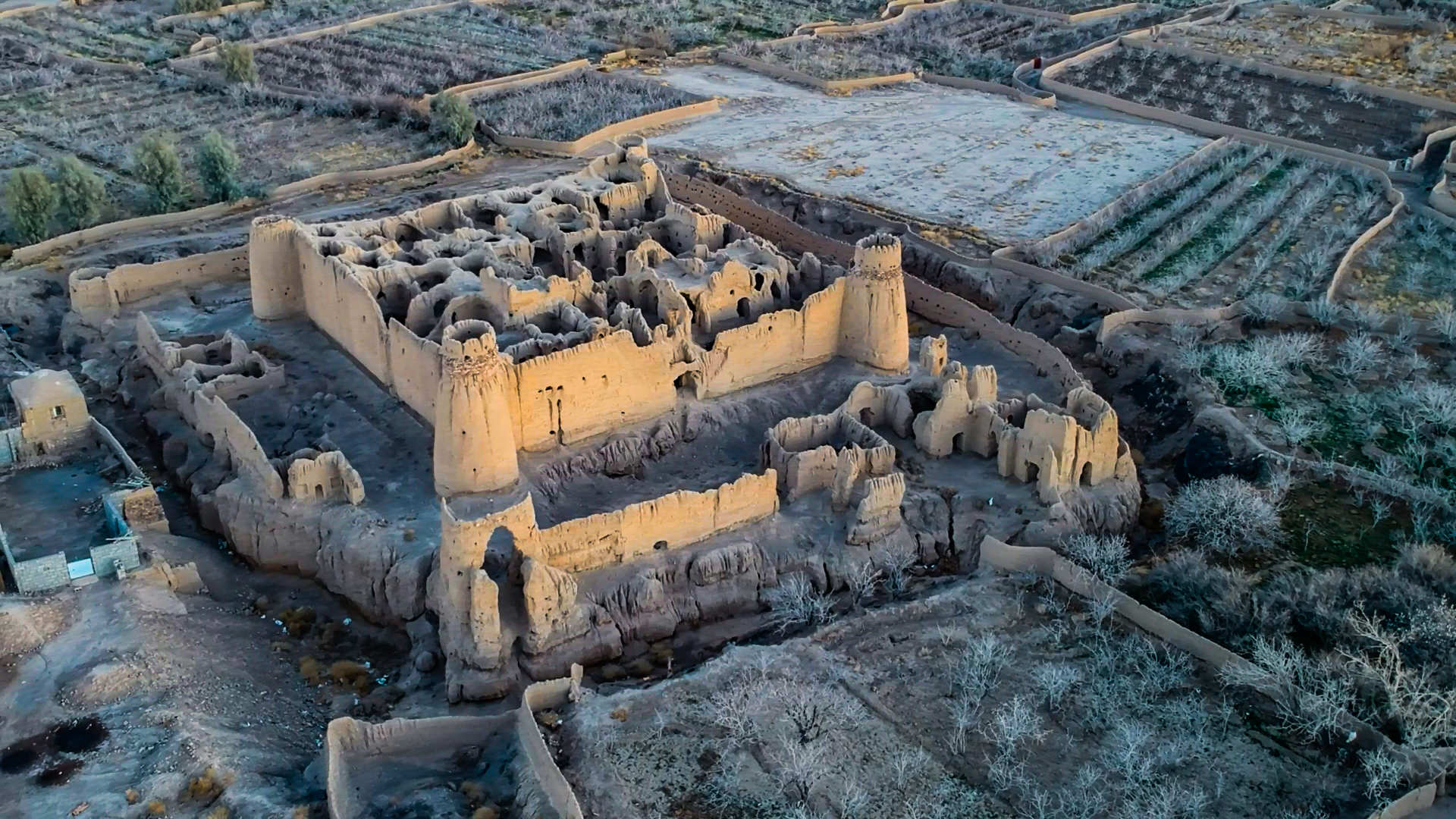
- Interactive map of the Kohneh Castle area

General information
- Type: Castle
- Location: Kuhbanan County, Iran
- Coordinates: 31.0368°N 56.2091°E

Kohneh Castle (Persian: قلعه کهنه) is a historical castle located in Kuhbanan County in Kerman Province, The longevity of this fortress dates back to the Safavid dynasty.
