= Deh-e Khvajeh =

Deh-e Khvajeh or Deh Khvajeh (Persian: ده خواجه) may refer to:

- Deh-e Khvajeh, Kuhbanan, Kerman Province
- Deh Khvajeh, Zarand, Kerman Province
- Deh-e Khvajeh, South Khorasan
