= Rasky =

Rasky is a surname. Notable people with the surname include:

- Harry Rasky (1928–2007), Canadian documentary film producer
- Susan Rasky (1952–2013), American university educator and political journalist

== See also ==
- Kasky
- Rask (disambiguation)
