= Givaran =

Givaran (Persian: گيوران) may refer to:

- Givaran, Kerman
- Givaran, West Azerbaijan
