= Rashg =

Rashg (Persian: راشگ) may refer to:

- Rashg-e Sarney
- Rashg-e Shavur

== See also ==
- Rashk (disambiguation)
