= Sabluiyeh =

Sabluiyeh or Sebluiyeh or Sabaluiyeh or Sobluiyeh or Sabalooeyeh (Persian: سبلوييه) may refer to:

- Sabluiyeh, Kuhbanan
- Sabluiyeh, Zarand
