= Kuhbanan =

City in Kerman province, Iran

Kuhbanan Persian: كوهبنان
- City
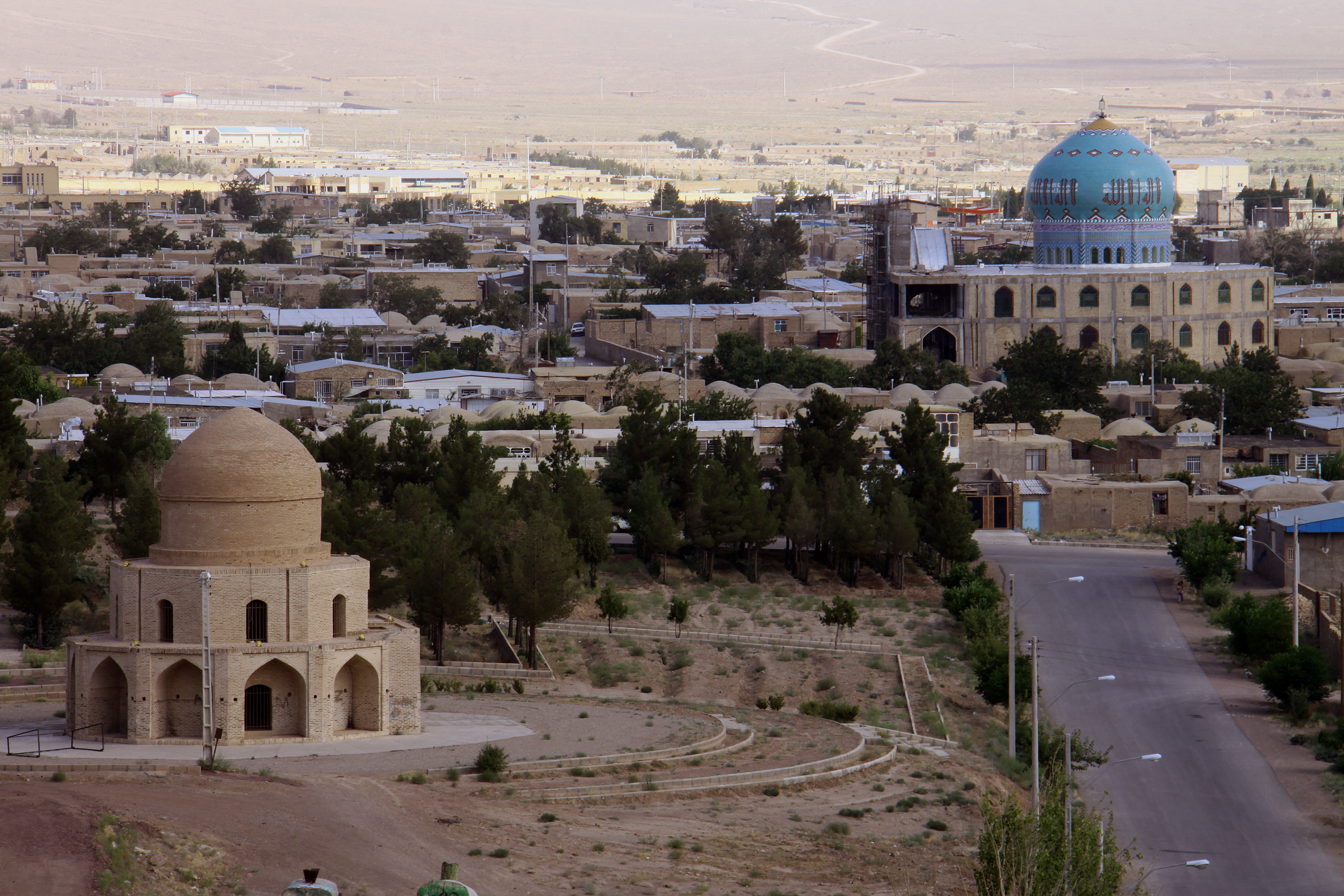

- Location within Iran
- Coordinates: 31°24′36″N 56°16′57″E
- Country: Iran
- Province: Kerman
- County: Kuhbanan
- District: Central

Population (2016)
  - Total: 10,761
- Time zone: UTC+3:30 (IRST)

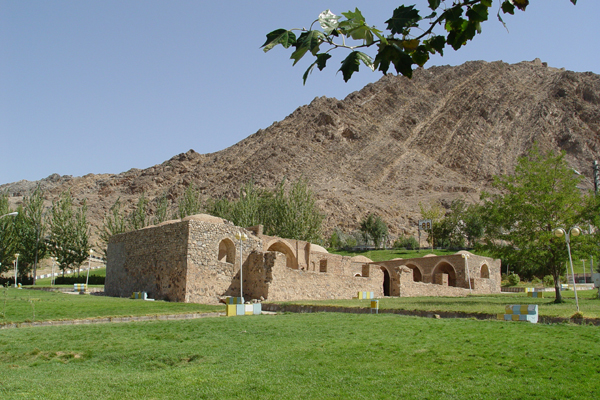

Kuhbanan (Persian: كوهبنان) (Note: Also romanized as Kūh Banān, Kūhbanān, and Kūhbonān; also known as Koobanan and Kūh Baneh) is a city in the Central District of Kuhbanan County, Kerman province, Iran, serving as capital of both the county and the district.

== Etymology ==
The name Kūhbanān means "pistachio-tree mountain", from the Persian words kūh, meaning "mountain", and banān, which refers to the wild pistachio.

== History ==
Kuhbanan was described by the 10th-century writer al-Muqaddasi as a small town with two gates. The town's jameh mosque was by one of these gates. Outside the walled part of the city was a suburban area, where there were bathhouses and caravanserais. Beyond this suburban area, Kuhbanan was surrounded by farms and orchards that extended as far as the foot of the nearby mountains.

Medieval Kuhbanan was renowned for its production of tutty, an impure oxide of zinc used as a salve for the eyes. As early as the 10th century, al-Muqaddasi listed tutty from Kuhbanan as one of the major exports of Kerman province. He wrote that it formed in finger-like "pipes", which were then purified by being roasted in long furnaces by the same mountainside where the ore was extracted. In the early 1200s, Yaqut al-Hamawi similarly described Kuhbanan, along with the nearby town of Behabad, as a major exporter of tutty. Marco Polo visited Kuhbinan, which he called Cobinan, in the 1300s, and provided a detailed description of the local tutty industry. Around the turn of the 20th century, the British traveler Percy Sykes witnessed the production of tutty in Kuhbanan; the process he described was essentially the same as that used hundreds of years earlier.

== Demographics ==
=== Population ===
At the time of the 2006 National Census, the city's population was 10,112 in 2,623 households. The following census in 2011 counted 11,093 people in 3,189 households. The 2016 census measured the population of the city as 10,761 people in 3,296 households.
