= Kohl (cosmetics) =

Eye cosmetic

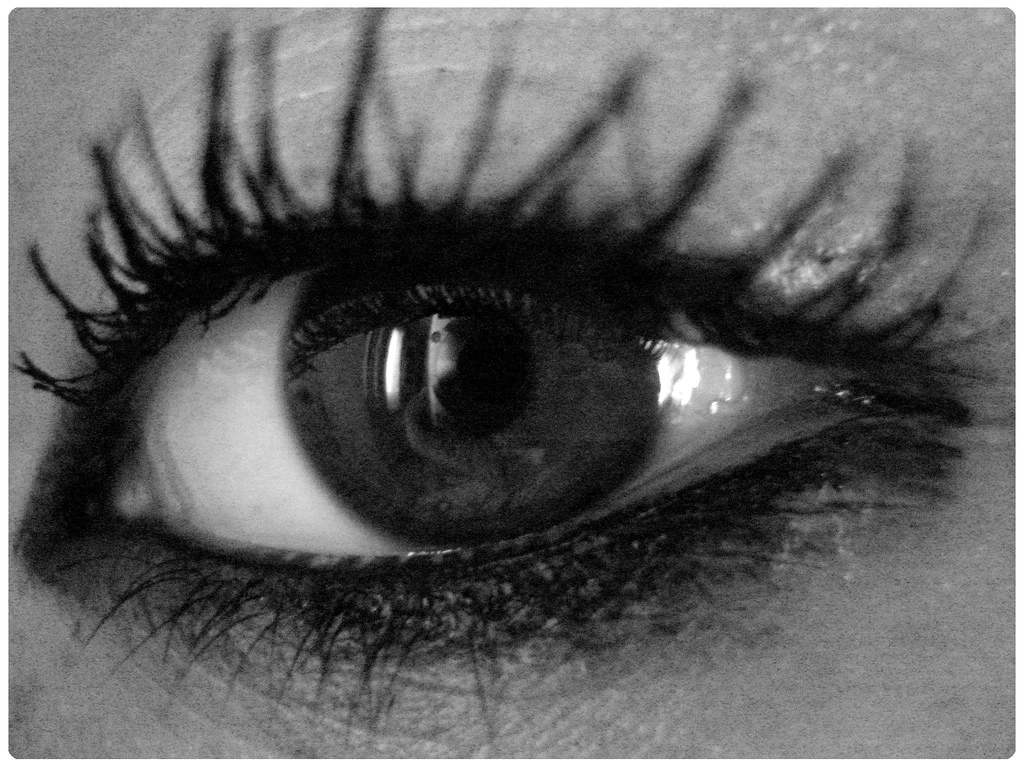
Eye shot of a woman with kohl

Kohl is a cosmetic product traditionally made by crushing stibnite (antimony sulfide). Modern kohl formulations often contain galena (lead sulfide), and in some cases charcoal or other pigments. Kohl is similar to eyeliner, and is widely used in many cultures to contour or darken the eyelids and heighten beauty marks. Several studies have questioned the safety of kohl out of fear of lead poisoning.

== Etymology ==
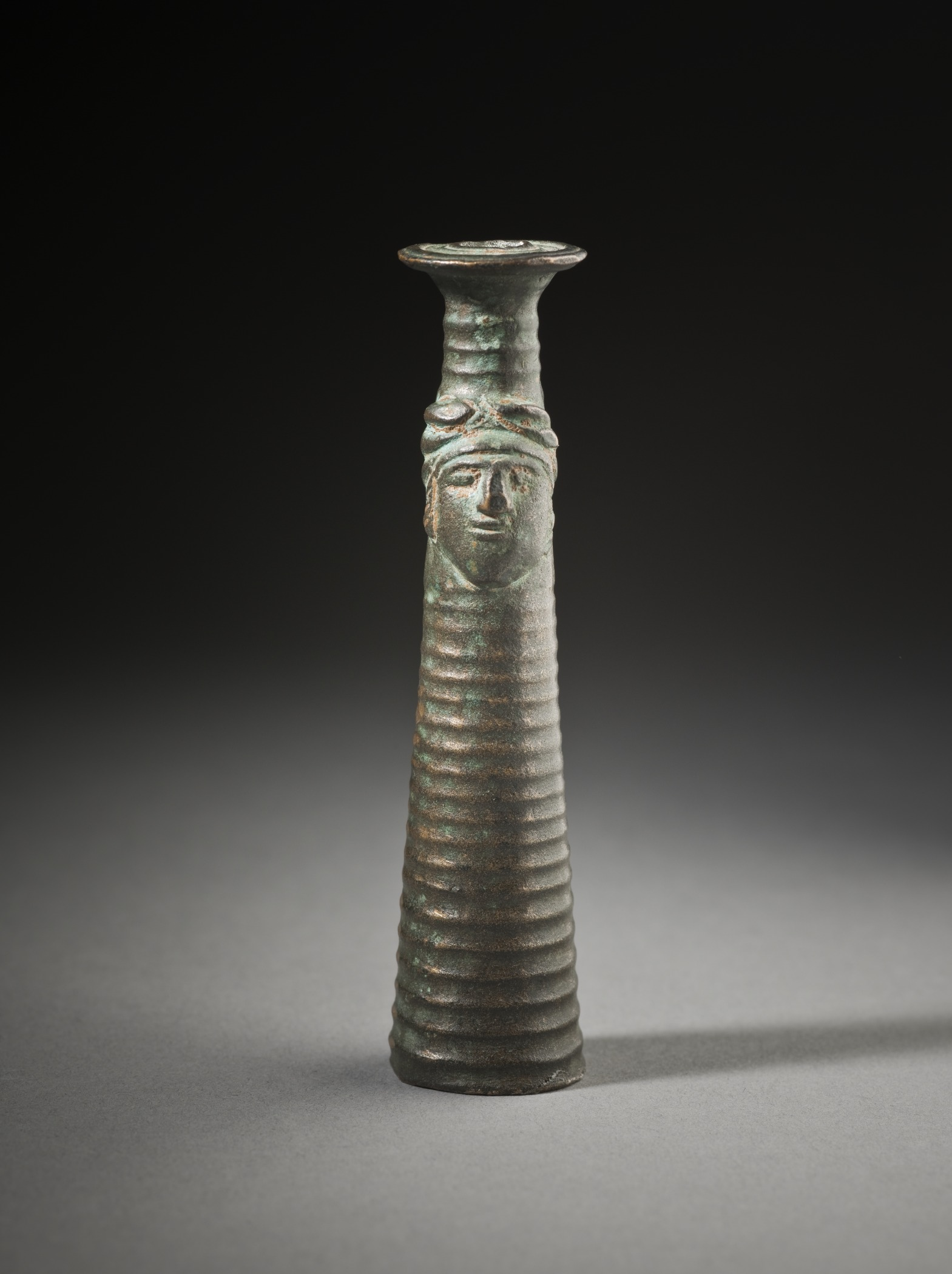
Ancient kohl cosmetic tube from western Iran, dated 800–500 BCE

The English word kohl derives from the Arabic kuḥl (كُحْل; also transliterated kuhl), traced to the triliteral root k-ḥ-l (ك-ح-ل). Kohl's Arabic name also survives in English by a second route: the word alcohol comes from the same Arabic root (ultimately the verb kahala, "to stain" or "to paint") transmitted through Middle Latin and French, The word originally referred to kohl itself, the finely ground antimony powder, before acquiring its modern definition in the 18th century.

== Middle East and North Africa ==
Kohl has been worn traditionally since the Naqada III era (c. 3100 BCE) by Egyptians of all social classes, originally as protection against eye ailments. There was also a belief that darkening the skin around the eyes would protect one from the harsh rays of the sun.

Archaeological and scientific research established the earliest direct evidence for use of kohl in Sudanese Lower Nubia. Lead isotope analysis of kohl samples from C-group and Pan-grave cemeteries in Debeira and Ashkeit, dated to Middle Bronze Age (c.2300 - 1500 BCE), demonstrates that Nubian populations were using and possibly producing kohl, with some materials sourced locally and others imported from Egypt. These findings are supported by the discovery of numerous kohl containers and applicators in Nubian graves that predate full Egyptian colonial control. The evidence challenges the traditional view that kohl use originated solely in Egypt, highlighting the central role of Nubian societies in development and spread of this iconic cosmetic.

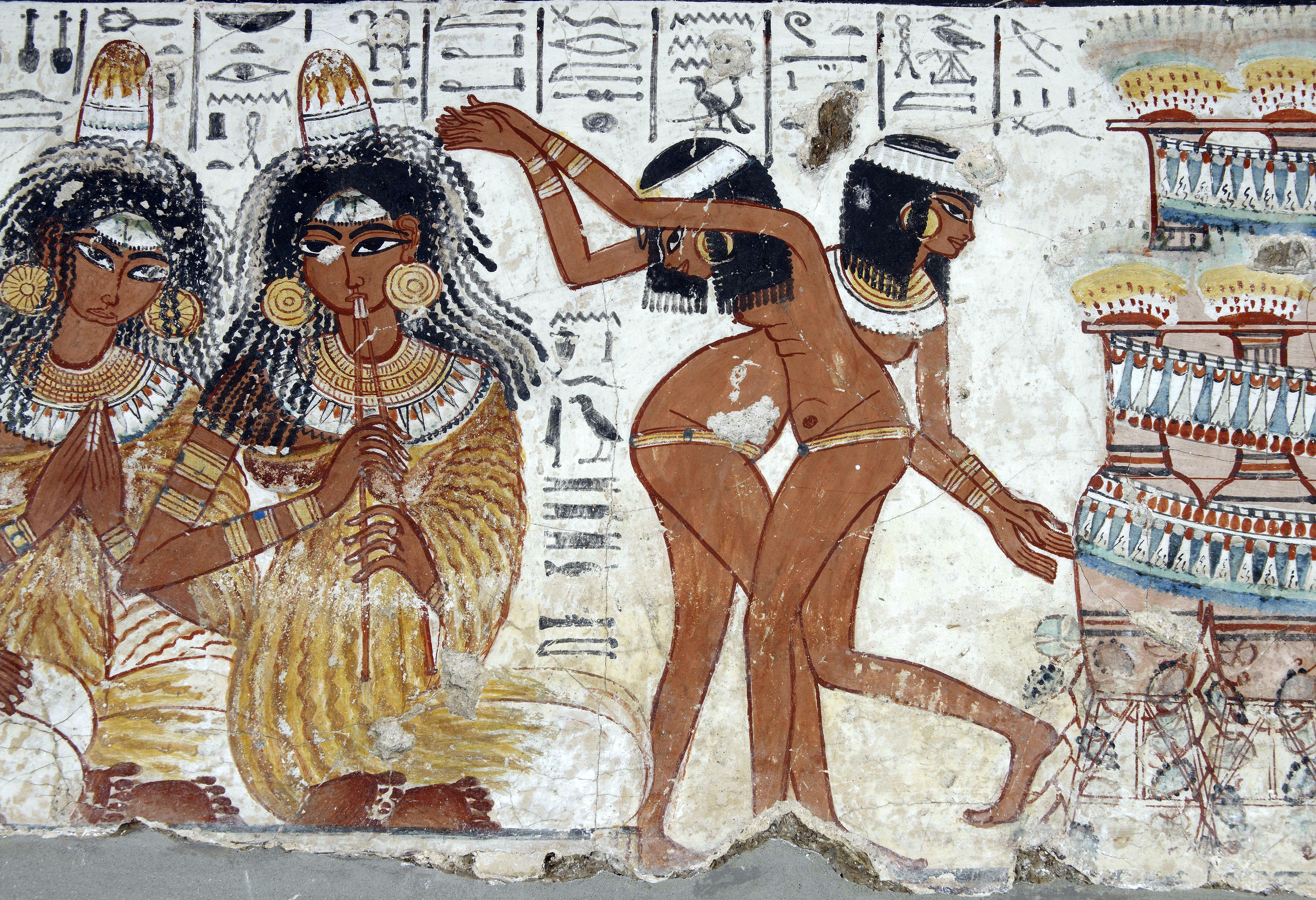
Ancient Egyptian women wearing kohl, from a tomb mural in Thebes (1420–1375 BCE)

Galena (lead sulfide) eye paint (later termed Kohl in Arabic from the Akkadian word for the cosmetic) was widely applied in ancient Egypt. The upper eyelids were painted black, and the lower ones were colored green, as depicted in ancient texts that describe the use of both black galena and green malachite. Ancient graves from the prehistoric Tasian culture point to the early application of galena in Egypt, a custom stretching from as old as the Badarian culture through to the Greco-Roman era. Although found locally, both black galena and green malachite were also imported from nearby regions in Western Asia, Coptos, and the Land of Punt.

The 18th Dynasty female Pharaoh Hatshepsut also had servants grind charred frankincense into kohl eyeliner. This is the first recorded use of the resin. The frankincense itself had originally been obtained during an expedition to the ancient Land of Punt in this New Kingdom dynasty (c. 1500 BCE). Cosmetic ingredients such as cinnamon bark and other spice components – used for fragrances – alongside copper kohl sticks were exported from the towns of Pomparippu and Kadiramalai-Kandarodai in Tamraparni (now, Sri Lanka) to ancient Egypt.

Additionally, the pioneering Muslim scholar ibn Abi Shaybah described in a legal compilation how to apply kohl to the eye, as narrated by earlier authorities. Berber and Semitic-speaking women in North Africa and the Middle East, respectively, also apply kohl to their faces. A vertical line is drawn from the bottom lip to the chin and along the bridge of the nose. Originally, the line from the bottom lip to the chin showed whether a woman was married or not. This form of using kohl on the face originated from the Arabian Peninsula, and was introduced in the seventh century to North Africa.

Kohl has also been used in Yemen as a cosmetic for a long time. In addition, mothers would apply kohl to their infants' eyes soon after birth. Some did this to "strengthen the child's eyes", and others believed it could prevent the child from being cursed by the evil eye.

== Horn of Africa ==
The usage of kohl eye paint in the Horn of Africa dates to the ancient Kingdom of Punt. Somali, Djiboutian, Ethiopian, and Eritrean women have long applied kohl (kuul) for cosmetic purposes, as well as to cleanse the eyes, lengthen eyelashes, and to protect the eyes from the sun's rays.

== West Africa ==
Kohl is also applied in by many peoples parts of West Africa, including the Fulani, the Hausa people, the Tuareg, and the Yoruba. In addition, it is utilized by Muslim inhabitants of the Sahel and Sahara regions. Kohl is used by both sexes and by people of all ages during weddings, festivals, and outings.

For women, kohl or black henna is applied to the face as well in a similar manner as that practiced by communities in North Africa.

== India ==
Although the terms kajal and Kohl are not identical, people often use them interchangeably. Traditionally kajal (pronounced kaa-jal/kājal) is made by burning oil/ghee and collecting soot, then mixing it with oils to form a paste. Sometimes it is mixed with camphor to give a cooling sensation. Herbs and sandalwood might be added for fragrance. In Indian culture, kajal is predominantly worn by women and children around their eyes. Some people apply dots of kajal to ward off bad omens and the evil eye (nazar).

Kajal is an integral part of classical dances in India, such as Bharatanatyam and Odissi. The dancers apply it broadly around their eyes to give them an elongated look so as to draw attention to their eye gestures and movements.

Surma is another popular cosmetic used in Indian subcontinent made of galena or other minerals. Both kajal and surma have been associated with potential chemical toxicity.

Ayurvedic texts describe Anjana as a collyrium made from various herbs and mineral compounds, including oxides and sulfides of metals such as antimony, zinc, and lead.

== Health concerns ==
The content of kohl and the recipes to prepare it vary greatly between regions. In North Africa and the Middle East, homemade kohl is often made by grinding galena (lead sulfide). Western manufacturers use amorphous carbon or organic charcoal instead of lead. Plant oils and the soot from various nuts, seeds, and gum resins are often added to the carbon powder. The non-lead products are considered to be of inferior quality to the older, traditional varieties, and so there has been an increase in the use of handmade, lead-based kohl.

For decades, various conflicting reports in literature have been published relating to kohl application to eyes being responsible for causing higher blood lead concentration, which may cause lead poisoning. At the same time, a number of research studies and reports have also been published, refuting any such links to increased blood lead levels upon kohl application.

A group of researchers in China tried to find some scientific basis of this claimed property of lead sulfide (galena) relating to absorption of sun rays when applied into the eyes in the form of kohl. The authors reported the ultraviolet (UV) absorption spectra of a thin film of lead sulfide prepared on an indium tin oxide (ITO) substrate. The spectra showed that thin films of lead sulfide had higher absorption and lower transmittance in the UV light band, which further increases with increased deposition voltage.

The drive to eliminate lead from kohl was sparked by studies in the early 1990s of preparations of kohl that found high levels of contaminants, including lead. Lead levels in commercial kohl preparations were as high as 84%. Kohl samples from Oman and Cairo, analyzed using X-ray powder diffraction and scanning electron microscopy, were found to contain galena. One decade later, a study of kohl manufactured in Egypt and India found that a third of the samples studied contained lead, while the remaining two-thirds contained amorphous carbon, zincite, cuprite, goethite, elemental silicon or talc, hematite, minium, and other organic compounds.

Lead-contaminated kohl use has been linked to increased levels of lead in the bloodstream, putting its users at risk of lead poisoning (also called lead intoxication). Complications of lead poisoning include anemia, developmental delay, low IQ, convulsions, and, in severe cases, death. Anemia from lead poisoning is of special concern in Middle Eastern and South Asian countries where other forms of anemia are prevalent, including iron deficiency anemia (from malnutrition) and hemoglobinopathy (sickle cell anemia, thalassemia).

These banned products are different from lead-free cosmetics that use the term "kohl" only to describe their shade or color rather than its actual ingredients. Some modern eye cosmetics are marketed as "kohl", but are prepared differently and follow relevant health standards.

Eye cosmetics such as surma are recognized as one of the important sources of lead exposure in Pakistan. As adverse health effects of heavy metals are a public health concern, where especially lead may cause negative health impacts to human fetal and infantile development, a study in Pakistan of pregnant women's nails in 2016, showed 13 nail samples out of 84 analyzed contained lead concentrations exceeding the 13.6 μg/g found in a fatal case of lead poisoning. The possibility of an external contamination was excluded. The observations showed that lead-containing surma consists of fine particles of galena in a respirable dust range (less than 10 μm), and relative in vitro bioavailability of lead in the surma was determined as 5.2%. Thus, lead-containing surma consists of inhalable and bioavailable particles, and it contributes to an increased risk of lead exposure.

"Blue" kohl is a dark-bluish black pigment composed of lead-based compounds as well as a compound of antimony. The lead-based compounds in kohl are galena (PbS) – dark grey and gloss, laurionite (PbCl(OH)) – white, phosgenite (PbCl)_{2}CO_{3}), and cerussite (PbCO_{3}) – blue. The antimony-based compound in kohl is stibnite (Sb_{2}S_{3}) – blue.

In January 2010, French researchers reported that the particular heavy eye makeup that ancient Egyptians wore may have had medical benefits. At submicromolar concentrations, the specially-made lead compounds can elicit overproduction of nitric oxide (NO), which in turn can trigger an enhancement of the immune response.

The ancient Egyptians, documented in the Ebers Papyrus (c. 1550 BCE), discuss these compounds within kohl as protective for the eyes. Indeed, kohl was used as both a cosmetic eyeliner and a medicine. There are a number of endemic ocular diseases in the Nile region including trachoma – which is caused by a chlamydial bacterium and can cause corneal scarring – and conjunctival cicatricial disease, with resulting visual loss. Kohl was used not only as a cosmetic but also as a medicinal collyrium (from Greek kollurion). Two of kohl's lead compounds – the lead chlorides laurionite and phosgenite – were not natural to the Nile valley. It is believed they were intentionally synthesized by the ancient Egyptians for this purpose. The widespread use of kohl across the Mediterranean and the Middle East attests to its ability to protect the eye from infectious disease and as well as being used as a cosmetic.

A test of kohl's anti microbial properties as found that kohl was especially able to inhibit the growth of Streptococcus pyogenes, and mildly able to inhibit Proteus vulgares and Staphylococcus aureus bacterias.

=== Legal status ===
In the United States, kohl is not on the list of color additives approved by the Food and Drug Administration, which considers kohl unsafe for use due to its potential lead content. It is illegal to import into, or sell in, the United States. Kohl is considered unsafe partly due to risk of lead exposure.

== Gallery ==
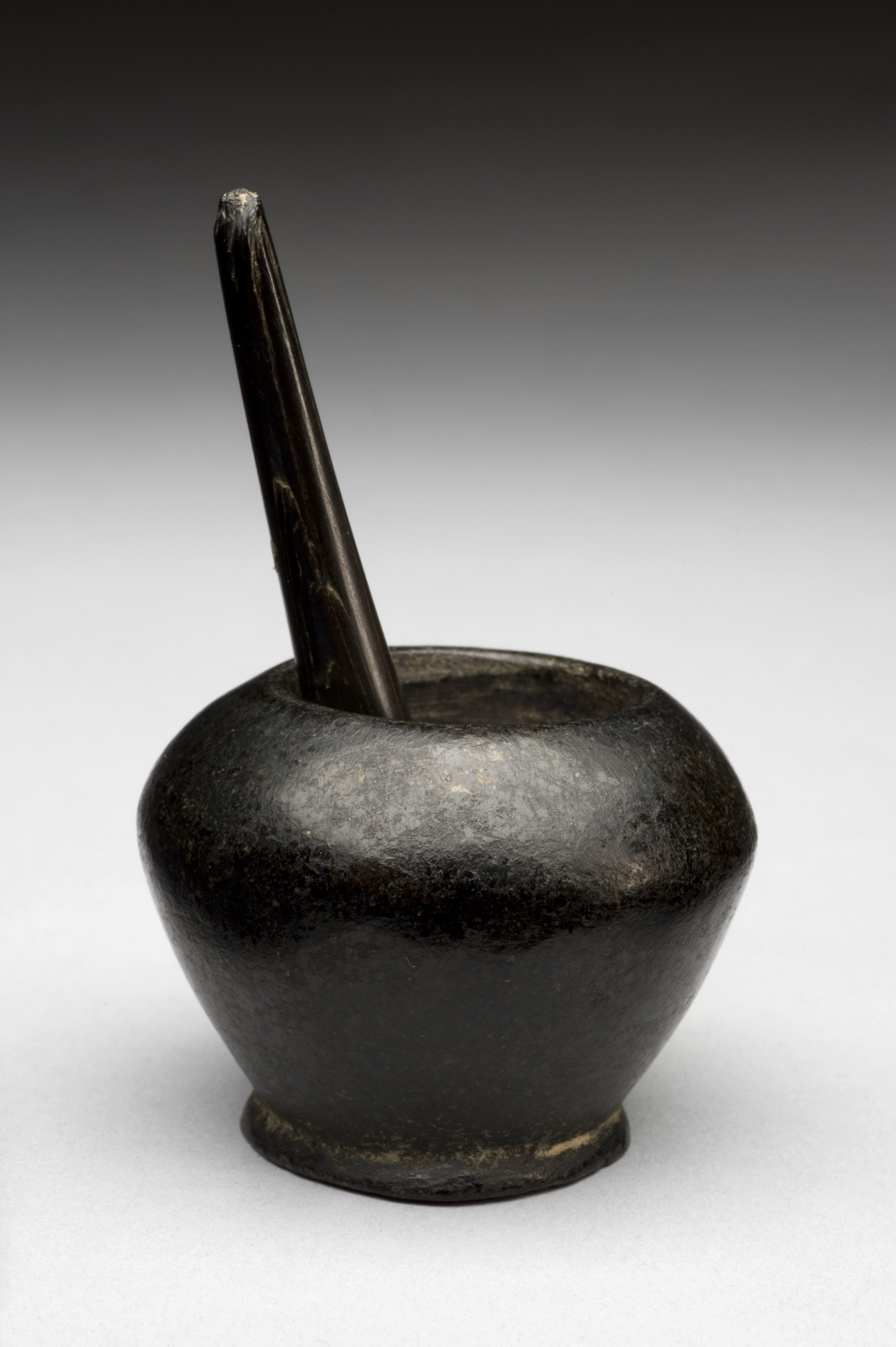
Ancient Egyptian kohl pot and stick, 1800-200 BCE

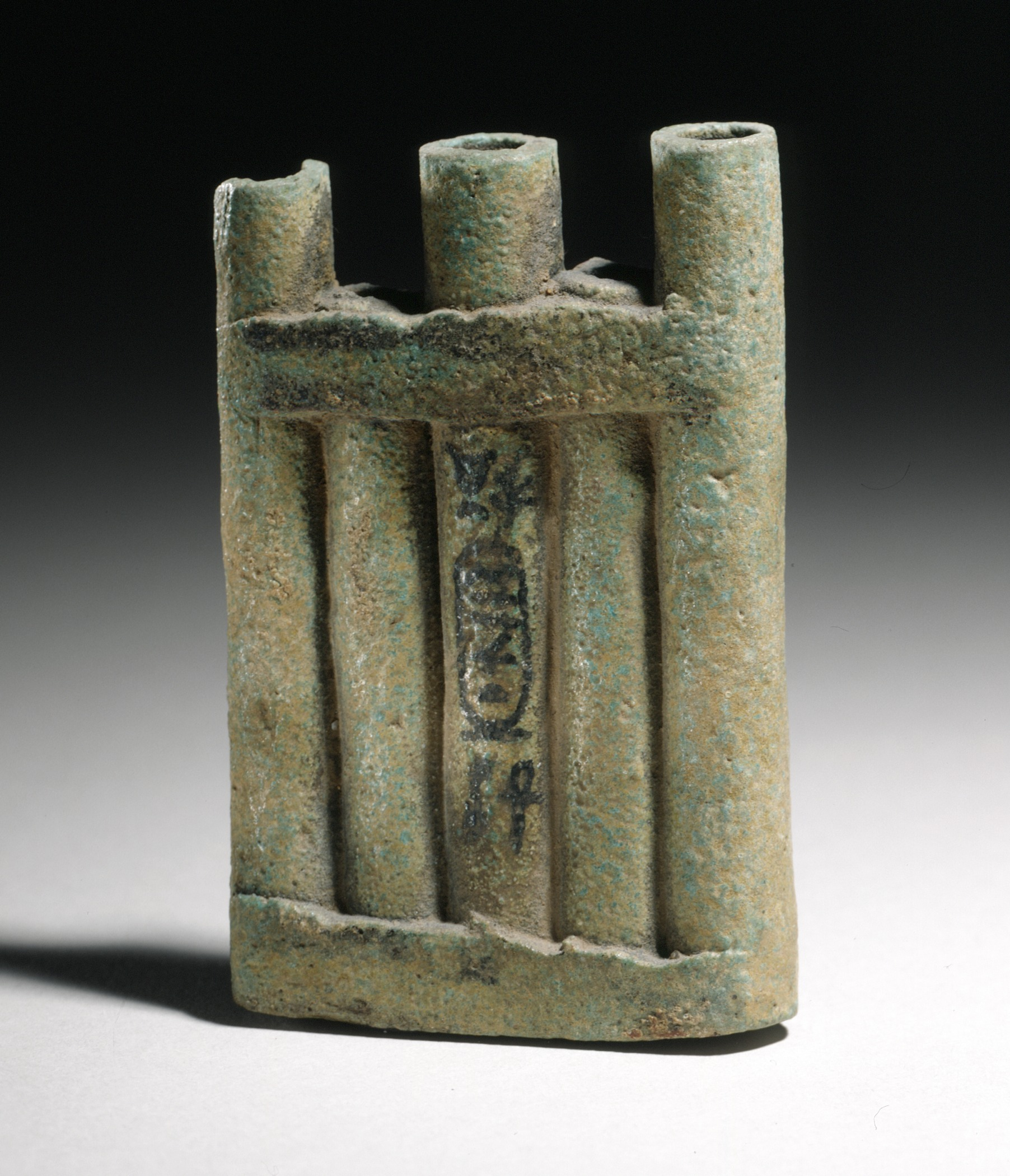
A kohl container from the 18th Dynasty of ancient Egypt, inscribed for Queen Tiye (1410–1372 BCE)

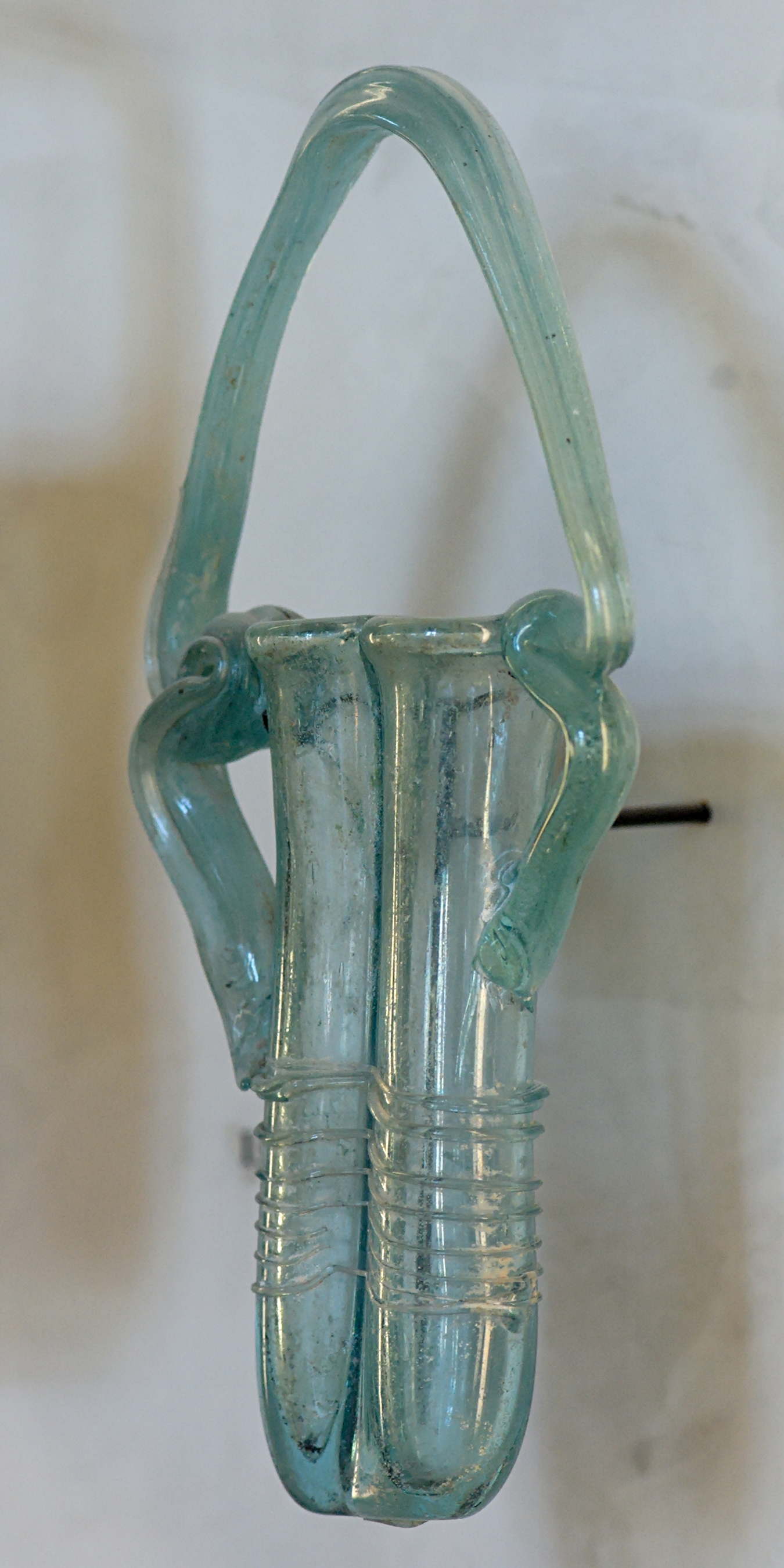
Double cosmetic tube (dilekythos) used for kohl; make-up was applied with an ivory, bronze or glass stick

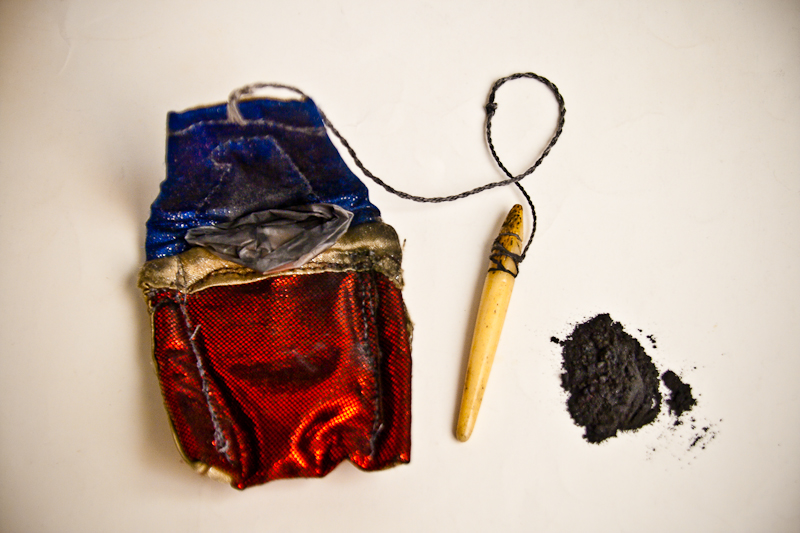
A Kurdish kohl (kil) set

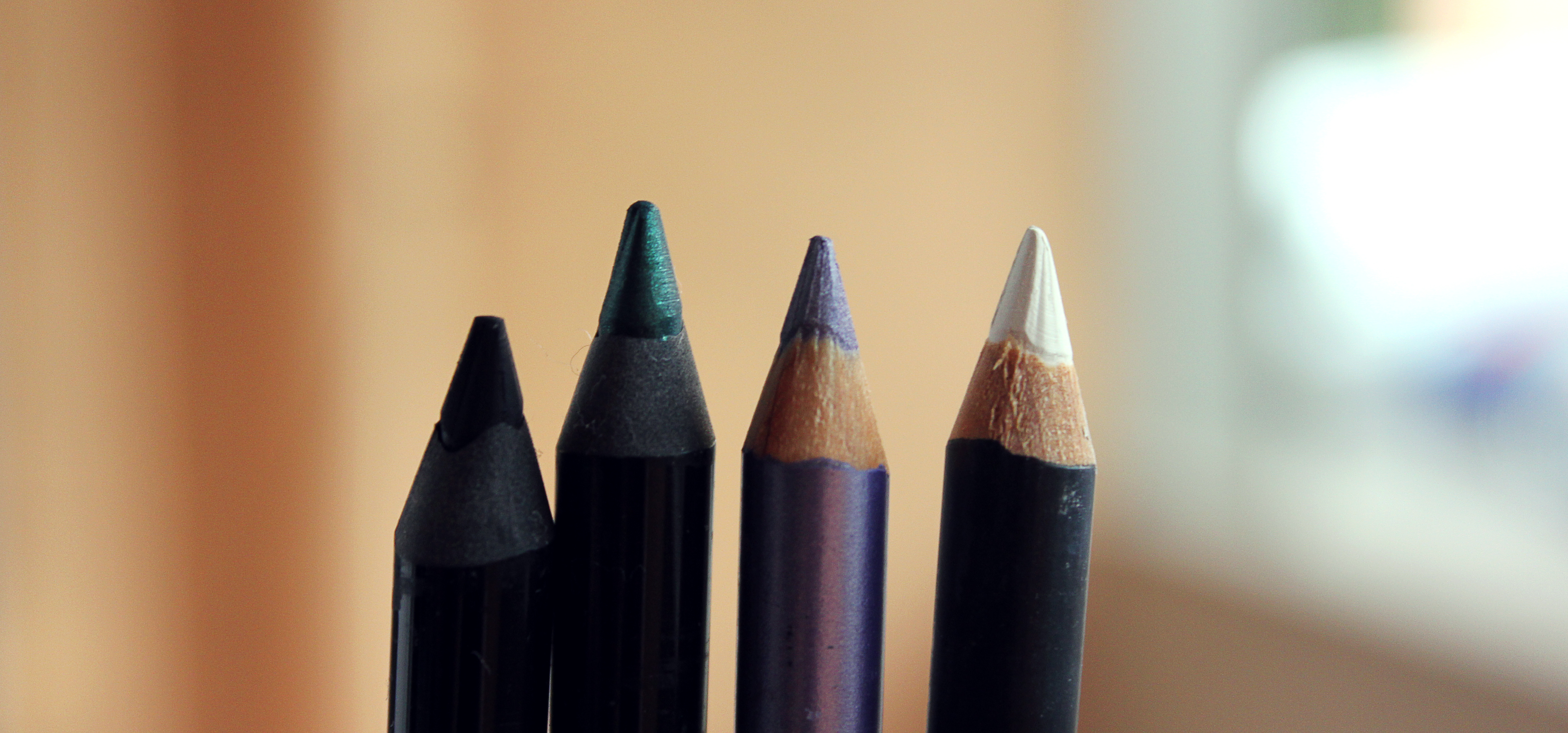
Modern kajal pencils

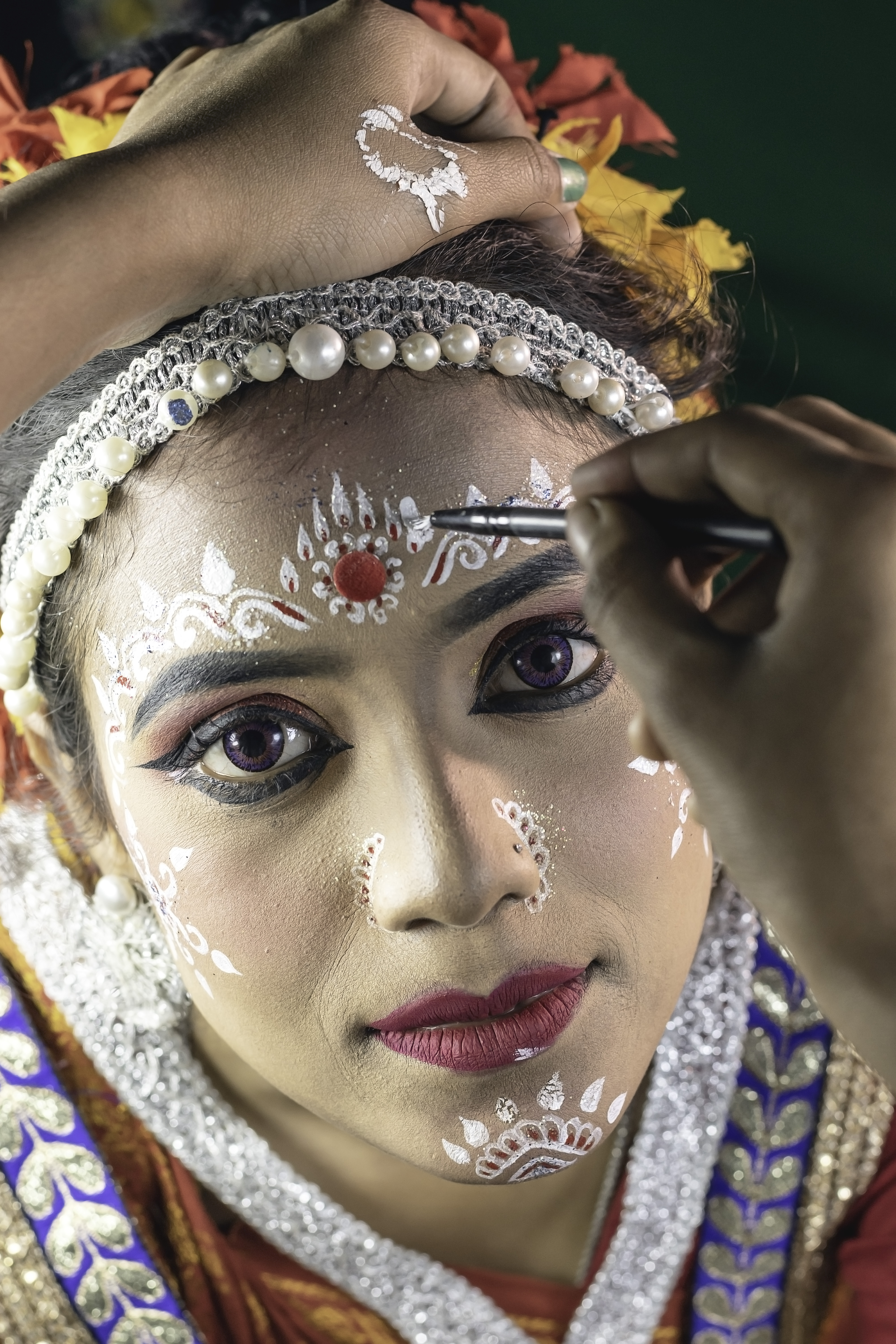
Make-up artist at work before a Gotipua Odissi dance performance

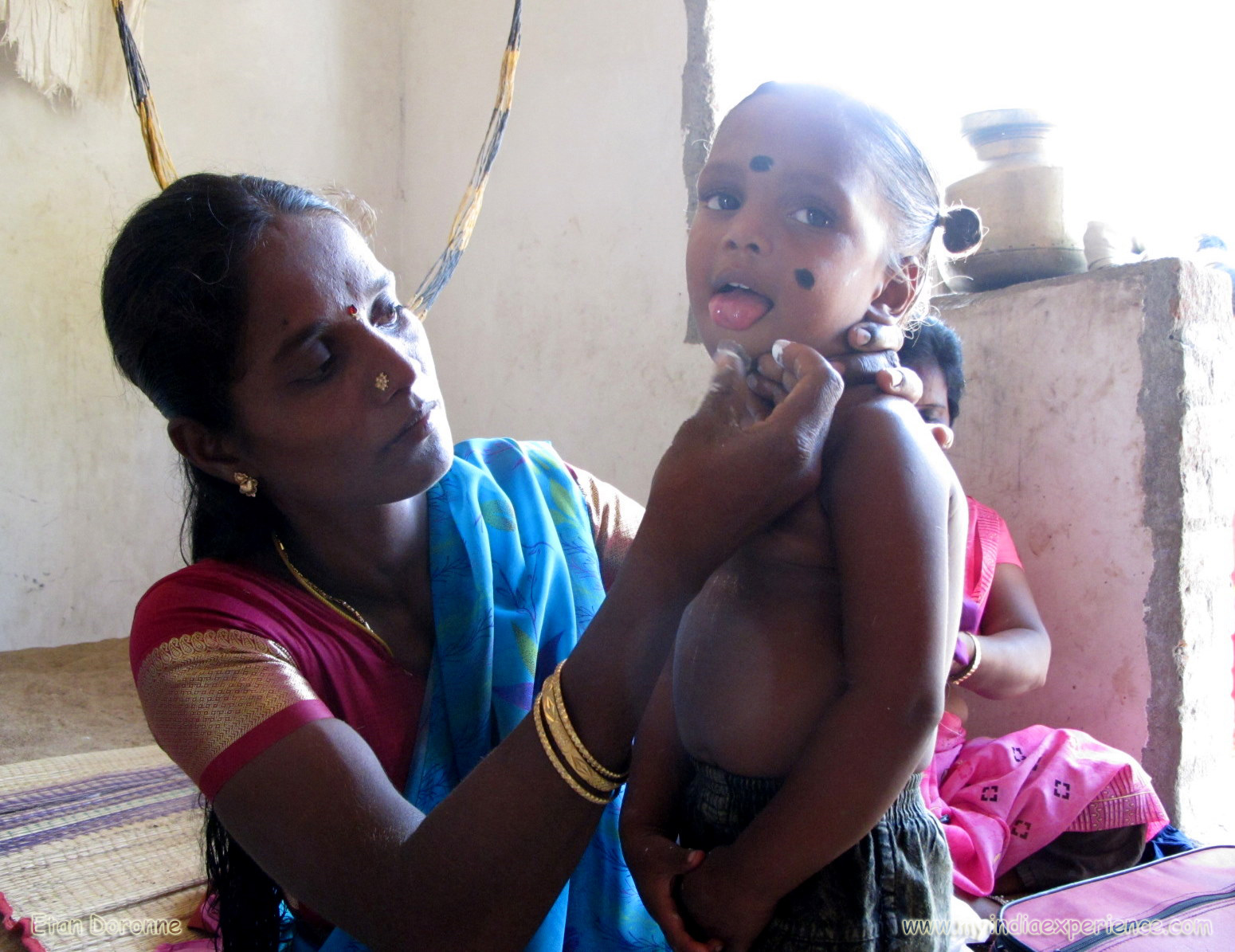
A Tamil woman applying kajal on her toddler son in India

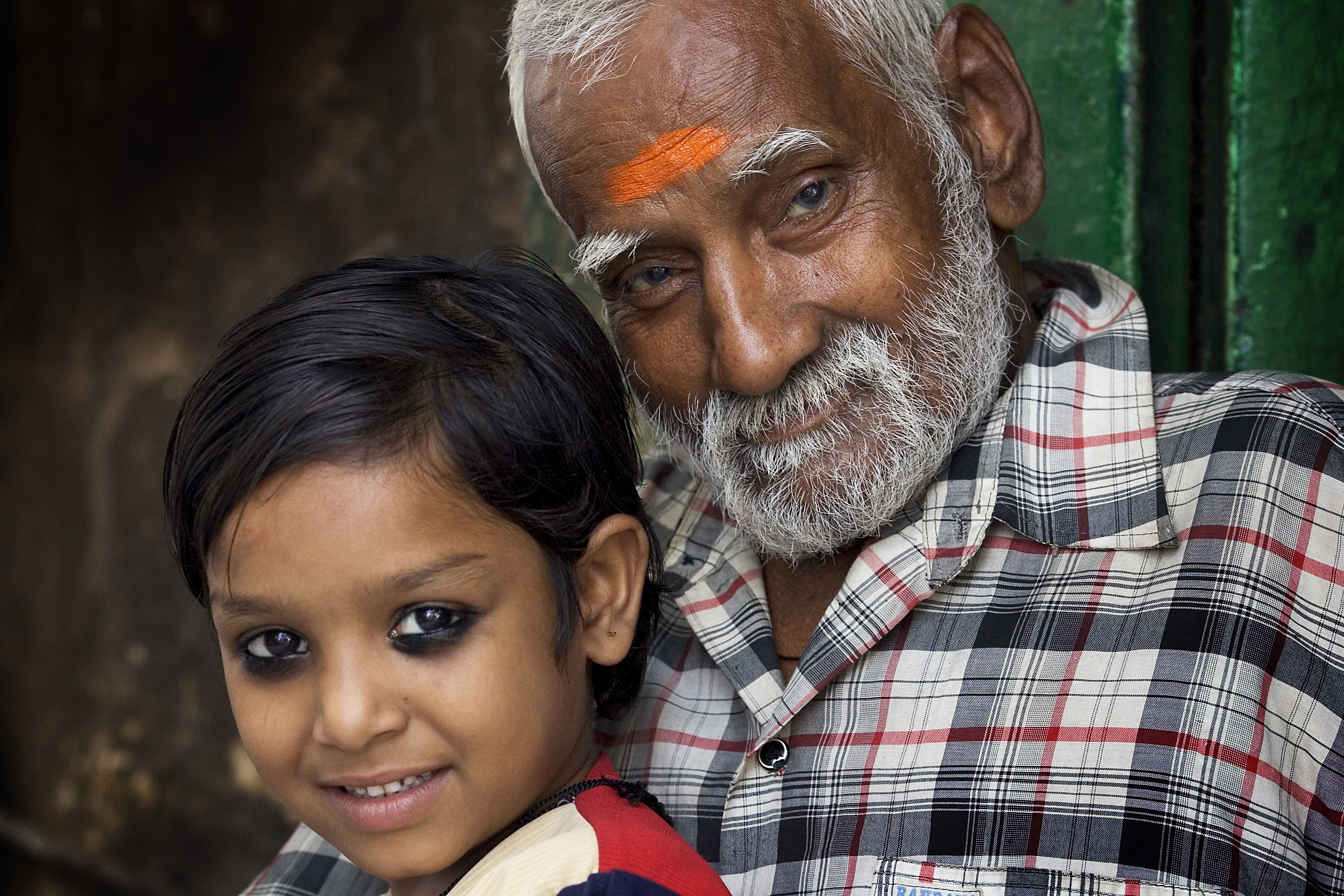
A Varanasi food seller with his granddaughter wearing kajal

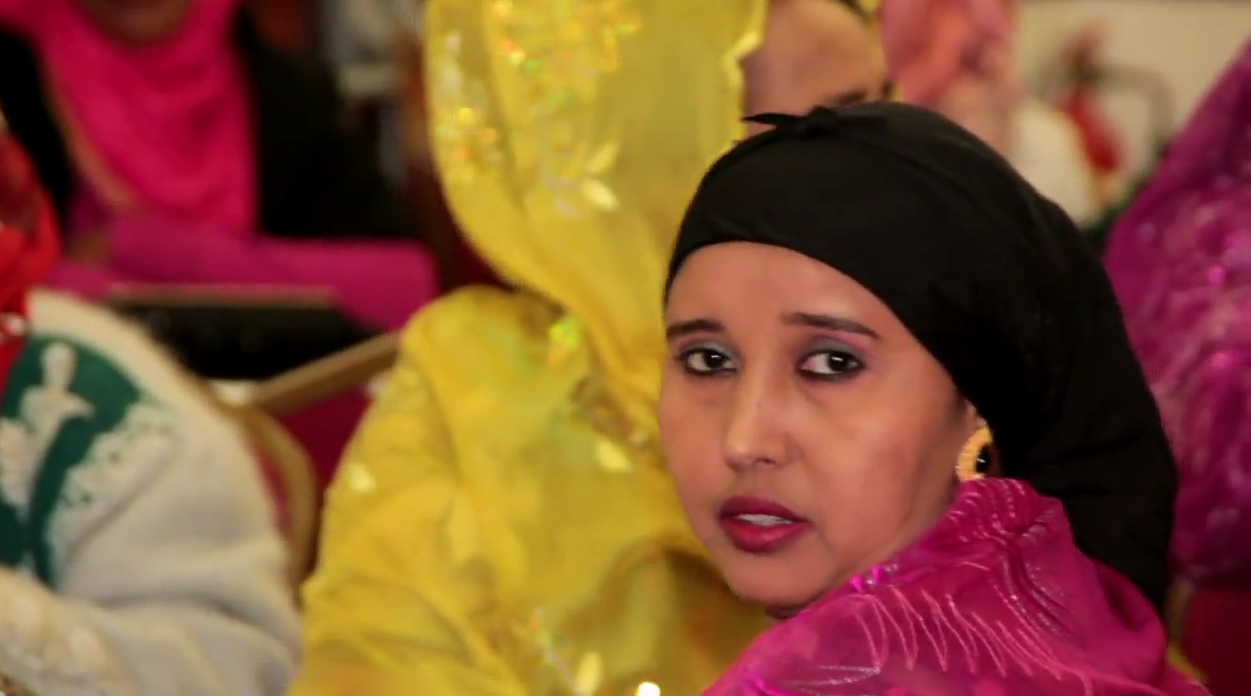
A Somali woman with indha kuul ("kohl eyes")

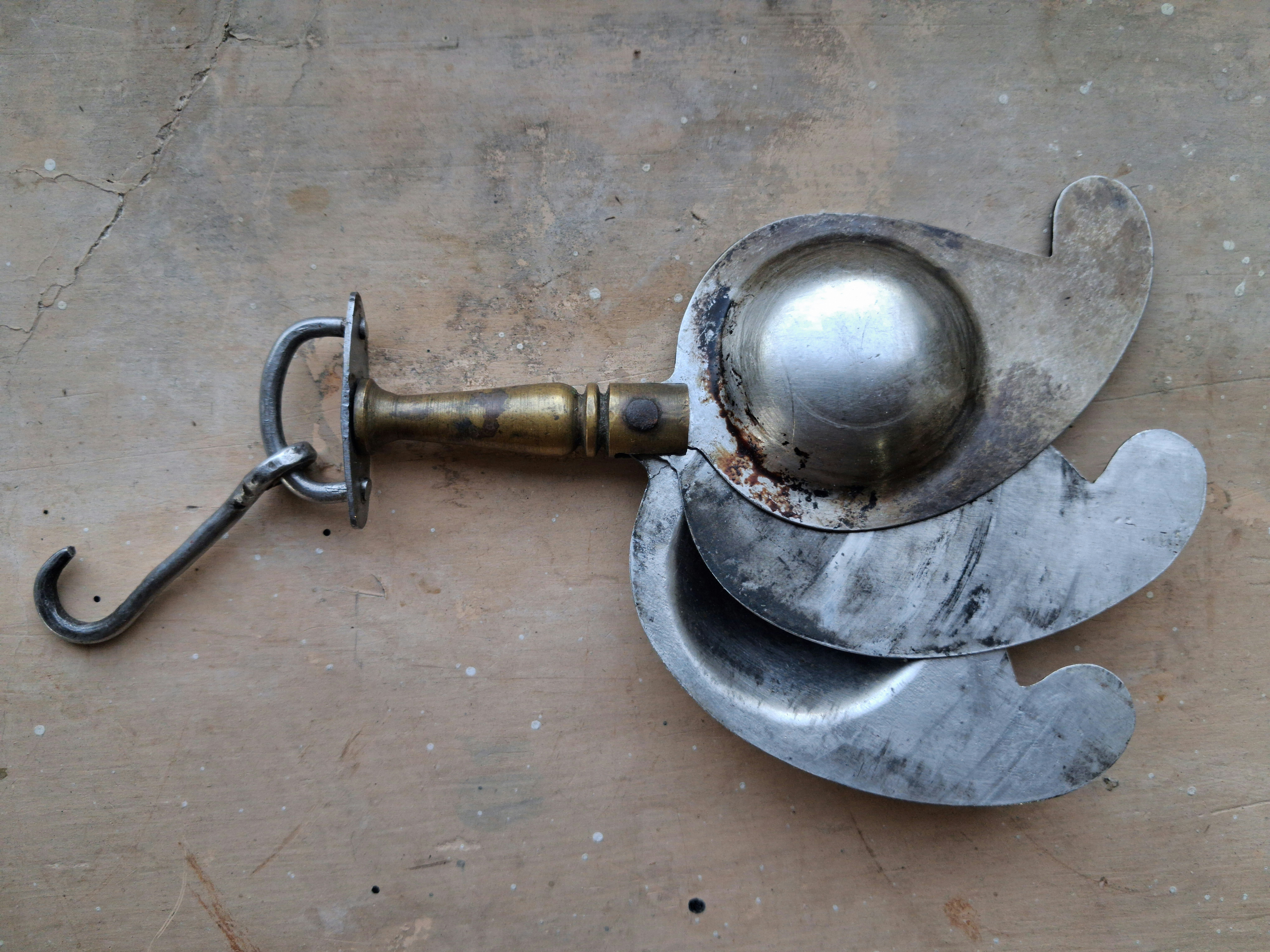
'Kajrauti'-Kohl container with steel body and brass handle in the paisley shape

== See also ==
- Henna
