= Rashk-e Olya, Kerman =

Rashk-e Olya رشک عليا
- Village
- Location within Iran
- Coordinates: 31°03′37″N 56°28′15″E
- Country: Iran
- Province: Kerman
- County: Kuhbanan
- Bakhsh: Toghrol Al Jerd
- Rural District: Toghrol Al Jerd

Population (2006)
  - Total: 176
- Time zone: UTC+3:30 (IRST)
  - Summer (DST): UTC+4:30 (IRDT)

Rashk-e Olya (Persian: رشک عليا, also Romanized as Rashk-e ‘Olyā and Rashk ‘Olyā; also known as Rashk, Rashk-e Bālā, Rask-e Bālā, and Rask-i-Du) is a village in Toghrol Al Jerd Rural District, Toghrol Al Jerd District, Kuhbanan County, Kerman Province, Iran. At the 2006 census, its population was 176, in 59 families.
