= Kianshahr =

City in Kerman province, Iran

Kianshahr Persian: كيانشهر
- City
- Location within Iran
- Coordinates: 31°09′16″N 56°22′58″E
- Country: Iran
- Province: Kerman
- County: Kuhbanan
- District: Toghrol ol Jerd

Population (2016)
  - Total: 4,543
- Time zone: UTC+3:30 (IRST)

Kianshahr (Persian: كيانشهر) (Note: Also romanized as Kian Shahr, Kīān Shahr and Kīyān Shār; also known as Shahrak-e Pābdānā) is a city in, and the capital of, Toghrol ol Jerd District of Kuhbanan County, Kerman province, Iran. It also serves as the administrative center for Toghrol ol Jerd Rural District.

== Demographics ==
=== Population ===
At the time of the 2006 National Census, the city's population was 6,503 in 1,555 households. The following census in 2011 counted 5,555 people in 1,494 households. The 2016 census measured the population of the city as 4,543 people in 1,257 households.
