= Rashk-e Sofla, Kerman =

Rashk-e Sofla رشك سفلي
- Village
- Location within Iran
- Coordinates: 31°04′53″N 56°26′57″E
- Country: Iran
- Province: Kerman
- County: Kuhbanan
- Bakhsh: Toghrol Al Jerd
- Rural District: Toghrol Al Jerd

Population (2006)
  - Total: 71
- Time zone: UTC+3:30 (IRST)
  - Summer (DST): UTC+4:30 (IRDT)

Rashk-e Sofla (Persian: رشك سفلي, also Romanized as Rashk-e Soflá and Rashk Soflá; also known as Rashk, Rashk-e Pā’īn, Rashksar, and Rask-i-Sar) is a village in Toghrol Al Jerd Rural District, Toghrol Al Jerd District, Kuhbanan County, Kerman Province, Iran. At the 2006 census, its population was 71, in 18 families.
