= Rask, Bardsir =

Rask راسك
- Village
- Location within Iran
- Coordinates: 29°29′28″N 57°11′08″E
- Country: Iran
- Province: Kerman
- County: Bardsir
- Bakhsh: Central
- Rural District: Golzar

Population (2006)
  - Total: 107
- Time zone: UTC+3:30 (IRST)
  - Summer (DST): UTC+4:30 (IRDT)

Rask (Persian: راسك, also Romanized as Rāsk and Rāsak) is a village in Golzar Rural District, in the Central District of Bardsir County, Kerman Province, Iran. At the 2006 census, its population was 107, in 22 families.
