= Shib (village) =

Shib شيب
- Village
- Location within Iran
- Coordinates: 36°04′55″N 58°54′37″E
- Country: Iran
- Province: Razavi Khorasan
- County: Nishapur
- Bakhsh: Central
- Rural District: Darbqazi

Population (2006)
  - Total: 139
- Time zone: UTC+3:30 (IRST)
  - Summer (DST): UTC+4:30 (IRDT)

Shib (Persian: شيب, also Romanized as Shīb; also known as Deh Shīb and Deh Sab) is a village in Darbqazi Rural District, in the Central District of Nishapur County, Razavi Khorasan Province, Iran. At the 2006 census, its population was 139, in 41 families.
