= Deh Shib, South Khorasan =

Deh Shib دهشيب
- Village
- Location within Iran
- Coordinates: 32°38′59″N 59°31′32″E
- Country: Iran
- Province: South Khorasan
- County: Sarbisheh
- Bakhsh: Mud
- Rural District: Mud

Population (2006)
  - Total: 71
- Time zone: UTC+3:30 (IRST)
  - Summer (DST): UTC+4:30 (IRDT)

Deh Shib (Persian: دهشيب, also Romanized as Deh Shīb) is a village in Mud Rural District, Mud District, Sarbisheh County, South Khorasan Province, Iran. According to the 2006 census, it had a population of 71 in 29 families.
