= Collyrium =

Type of pre-modern eyewash

In eye care, collyrium is an antique term for a lotion or liquid wash used as a cleanser for the eyes, particularly in diseases of the eye. The word collyrium comes from the Greek κολλύριον, eye-salve. The same name was also given to unguents used for the same purpose, such as unguent of tutty (Sanskrit tuttha meaning variously zinc oxide or blue vitriol). Lastly, the name was given, though improperly, to some liquid medicines used against venereal diseases.

Pre-modern medicine distinguished two kinds of collyriums: the one liquid, the other dry. Liquid collyriums were composed of ophthalmic powders, or waters, such as rose-water, plantain-water, that of fennel, eyebright, etc., in which was dissolved tutty, white vitriol, or some other proper powder. Dry collyriums were pastilles of Rhasis, sugar-candy, iris, tutty prepared and blown into the eye with a little pipe.

The 2nd century Mishnah mentions collyrium. The Sunan Abu Dawood reports, "Prophet Muhammad said: 'Among the best types of collyrium is antimony (ithmid) for it clears the vision and makes the hair sprout.'" Maimonides (12th century Egypt) mentions the use of this eye salve.
