= Estarj =

Estarj استارج
- Village
- Location within Iran
- Coordinates: 31°42′06″N 53°42′22″E
- Country: Iran
- Province: Yazd
- County: Taft
- Bakhsh: Central
- Rural District: Nasrabad

Population (2006)
  - Total: 13
- Time zone: UTC+3:30 (IRST)
  - Summer (DST): UTC+4:30 (IRDT)

Estarj (Persian: استارج, romanized: Estārj), also known as Estāj, is a village in Nasrabad Rural District, in the Central District of Taft County, Yazd Province, Iran. At the 2006 census, its population was 13, in 5 families.
