= Rezaviyeh, South Khorasan =

Rezaviyeh رضويه
- Village
- Location within Iran
- Coordinates: 32°33′00″N 59°07′24″E
- Country: Iran
- Province: South Khorasan
- County: Khusf
- Bakhsh: Jolgeh-e Mazhan
- Rural District: Jolgeh-e Mazhan

Population (2006)
  - Total: 52
- Time zone: UTC+3:30 (IRST)
  - Summer (DST): UTC+4:30 (IRDT)

Rezaviyeh (Persian: رضويه, also Romanized as Reẕavīyeh; also known as Morteẕavīyeh (Persian: مرتضويه) and Murtazavīyeh) is a village in Jolgeh-e Mazhan Rural District, Jolgeh-e Mazhan District, Khusf County, South Khorasan Province, Iran. At the 2006 census, its population was 52, in 13 families.
