= Estaj, Mashhad =

Estaj استاج
- Village
- Location within Iran
- Coordinates: 36°02′01″N 59°32′42″E
- Country: Iran
- Province: Razavi Khorasan
- County: Mashhad
- Bakhsh: Ahmadabad
- Rural District: Sarjam

Population (2006)
  - Total: 78
- Time zone: UTC+3:30 (IRST)
  - Summer (DST): UTC+4:30 (IRDT)

Estaj (Persian: استاج, also Romanized as Estāj) is a village in Sarjam Rural District, Ahmadabad District, Mashhad County, Razavi Khorasan Province, Iran. At the 2006 census, its population was 78, in 23 families.
