= Rashk, Hormozgan =

Village in Hormozgan, Iran

Rashk راشك
- Village
- Location within Iran
- Coordinates: 27°02′54″N 57°20′48″E
- Country: Iran
- Province: Hormozgan
- County: Minab
- Bakhsh: Tukahur
- Rural District: Tukahur

Population (2006)
  - Total: 75
- Time zone: UTC+3:30 (IRST)
  - Summer (DST): UTC+4:30 (IRDT)

Rashk (Persian: راشك, also Romanized as Rāshk; also known as Rājg-e Sarney, Rāshg-e Sarney, and Rāshk-e Sarney) is a village in Tukahur Rural District, Tukahur District, Minab County, Hormozgan Province, Iran. At the 2006 census, its population was 75, in 20 families.
