= Cadmia =

Cadmium buildup in furnaces

In alchemy, cadmia (Latin for cadmium) is an oxide of zinc (tutty; from Arabic: توتيا tutiya, via Persian, from Sanskrit तुत्थ tuttha) which collects on the sides of furnaces where copper or brass was smelted, and zinc sublimed. The term is also applied to an ore of cobalt.

For the cadmium produced in furnaces, there were five identified kinds: the first called botrytis, as being in the form of a bunch of grapes; the second, ostracitis, as resembling a sea shell; the third, placitis, for resembling a crust; the fourth, capnitis; and the fifth, calamitis, which hung around certain iron rods that were used to stir material in the furnace; being shaken off, the cadmium resembled the figure of a quill, called in the Latin, calamus. The cadmia botrytis was found in the middle of the furnace; the ostrytis at the bottom; the placitis at the top; and the capnitis at the mouth of the furnace.

Cadmia may be related to the ancient alloy known as Orichalcum, and may have at times been included in its mix.

In pre-modern medicine, cadmium was used as a desiccative and detersive, in moist stinking ulcers, causing the area to become healed by the formation of scar tissue. The botrytis and placitis were also used for diseases of the eyes.

The term cadmia was formerly applied to the mineral cadmium, or lapis calaminaris.
