= Rashk-e Sofla, Fars =

Village in Fars, Iran

Rashk-e Sofla راشكسفلي
- Village
- Location within Iran
- Coordinates: 30°05′39″N 51°49′19″E
- Country: Iran
- Province: Fars
- County: Sepidan
- Bakhsh: Hamaijan
- Rural District: Sornabad

Population (2006)
  - Total: 428
- Time zone: UTC+3:30 (IRST)
  - Summer (DST): UTC+4:30 (IRDT)

Rashk-e Sofla (Persian: راشكسفلي, also Romanized as Rāshk-e Soflá; also known as Rāshk and Rāshk-e Pā’īn) is a village in Sornabad Rural District, Hamaijan District, Sepidan County, Fars province, Iran. At the 2006 census, its population was 428, in 106 families.
