= Shaab Jereh Rural District =

Rural district in Kerman province, Iran

Shaab Jereh Rural District Persian: دهستان شعبجره
- Rural District
- Location within Iran
- Coordinates: 31°07′05″N 56°04′28″E
- Country: Iran
- Province: Kerman
- County: Zarand
- District: Yazdanabad
- Capital: Shaab Jereh

Population (2016)
  - Total: 2,383
- Time zone: UTC+3:30 (IRST)

Shaab Jereh Rural District (Persian: دهستان شعبجره) is in Yazdanabad District of Zarand County, Kerman province, Iran. Its capital is the village of Shaab Jereh.

== Demographics ==
=== Population ===
At the time of the 2006 National Census, the rural district's population (as a part of Toghrol ol Jerd District in Kuhbanan County) was 2,227 in 589 households. There were 1,790 inhabitants in 556 households at the following census of 2011, by which time the rural district had been separated from the county to join Yazdanabad District of Zarand County. The 2016 census measured the population of the rural district as 2,383 in 750 households. The most populous of its 21 villages was Shaab Jereh, with 1,883 people.
