= Toghrol ol Jerd Rural District =

Rural district in Kerman province, Iran

Toghrol ol Jerd Rural District Persian: دهستان طغرل الجرد
- Rural District
- Location within Iran
- Coordinates: 31°06′31″N 56°20′09″E
- Country: Iran
- Province: Kerman
- County: Kuhbanan
- District: Toghrol ol Jerd
- Capital: Kianshahr

Population (2016)
  - Total: 1,350
- Time zone: UTC+3:30 (IRST)

Toghrol ol Jerd Rural District (Persian: دهستان طغرل الجرد) is in Toghrol ol Jerd District of Kuhbanan County, Kerman province, Iran. It is administered from the city of Kianshahr.

== Demographics ==
=== Population ===
At the time of the 2006 National Census, the rural district's population was 1,200 in 387 households. There were 674 inhabitants in 196 households at the following census of 2011. The 2016 census measured the population of the rural district as 1,350 in 387 households. The most populous of its 63 villages was Khanmakan, with 454 people.
