= Khorramdasht Rural District (Kuhbanan County) =

Rural district in Kerman province, Iran

Khorramdasht Rural District Persian: دهستان خرمدشت
- Rural District
- Location within Iran
- Coordinates: 31°25′53″N 55°59′51″E
- Country: Iran
- Province: Kerman
- County: Kuhbanan
- District: Central
- Capital: Qaryeh Ali

Population (2016)
  - Total: 2,141
- Time zone: UTC+3:30 (IRST)

Khorramdasht Rural District (Persian: دهستان خرمدشت) is in the Central District of Kuhbanan County, Kerman province, Iran. Its capital is the village of Qaryeh Ali. (Note: Also known as Deh-e Ali and Khorramdasht)

== Demographics ==
=== Population ===
At the time of the 2006 National Census, the rural district's population was 1,640 in 480 households. There were 1,885 inhabitants in 631 households at the following census of 2011. The 2016 census measured the population of the rural district as 2,141 in 697 households. The most populous of its 58 villages was Qaryeh Ali, with 902 people.
