= Toghrol ol Jerd District =

District in Kerman province, Iran

Toghrol ol Jerd District Persian: بخش طغرل الجرد
- District
- Location within Iran
- Coordinates: 31°06′31″N 56°20′09″E
- Country: Iran
- Province: Kerman
- County: Kuhbanan
- Capital: Kianshahr

Population (2016)
  - Total: 5,893
- Time zone: UTC+3:30 (IRST)

Toghrol ol Jerd District (Persian: بخش طغرل الجرد) is in Kuhbanan County, Kerman province, Iran. Its capital is the city of Kianshahr.

== History ==
After the 2006 National Census, Shaab Jereh Rural District was separated from the district to join Zarand County.

== Demographics ==
=== Population ===
At the time of the 2006 census, the district's population was 9,930 in 2,471 households. The following census in 2011 counted 6,229 people in 1,690 households. The 2016 census measured the population of the district as 5,893 inhabitants in 1,644 households.

=== Administrative divisions ===
Toghrol ol Jerd District Population
Administrative Divisions	2006	2011	2016
Shaab Jereh RD (Note: Transferred to Zarand County)	2,227		
Toghrol ol Jerd RD	1,200	674	1,350
Kianshahr (city)	6,503	5,555	4,543
Total	9,930	6,229	5,893
RD = Rural District
