= Javar Rural District =

Rural district in Kerman province, Iran

Javar Rural District Persian: دهستان جور
- Rural District
- Location within Iran
- Coordinates: 31°26′52″N 56°17′35″E
- Country: Iran
- Province: Kerman
- County: Kuhbanan
- District: Central
- Capital: Gavar

Population (2016)
  - Total: 2,385
- Time zone: UTC+3:30 (IRST)

Javar Rural District (Persian: دهستان جور) is in the Central District of Kuhbanan County, Kerman province, Iran. Its capital is the village of Gavar.

== Demographics ==
=== Population ===
At the time of the 2006 National Census, the rural district's population was 2,783 in 774 households. There were 2,514 inhabitants in 770 households at the following census of 2011. The 2016 census measured the population of the rural district as 2,385 in 769 households. The most populous of its 113 villages was Gavar, with 1,508 people.
