= Central District (Kuhbanan County) =

District in Kerman province, Iran

Central District (Kuhbanan County) Persian: بخش مرکزی شهرستان کوهبنان
- District
- Location within Iran
- Coordinates: 31°26′56″N 56°07′01″E
- Country: Iran
- Province: Kerman
- County: Kuhbanan
- Capital: Kuhbanan

Population (2016)
  - Total: 15,287
- Time zone: UTC+3:30 (IRST)

The Central District of Kuhbanan County (Persian: بخش مرکزی شهرستان کوهبنان) is in Kerman province, Iran. Its capital is the city of Kuhbanan.

== Demographics ==
=== Population ===
At the time of the 2006 National Census, the district's population was 14,535 in 3,877 households. The following census in 2011 counted 15,492 people in 4,590 households. The 2016 census measured the population of the district as 15,287 inhabitants in 4,762 households.

=== Administrative divisions ===
Central District (Kuhbanan County) Population
Administrative Divisions	2006	2011	2016
Javar RD	2,783	2,514	2,385
Khorramdasht RD	1,640	1,885	2,141
Kuhbanan (city)	10,112	11,093	10,761
Total	14,535	15,492	15,287
RD = Rural District
