= Kuhbanan County =

County in Kerman province, Iran

Kuhbanan County Persian: شهرستان کوهبنان
- County
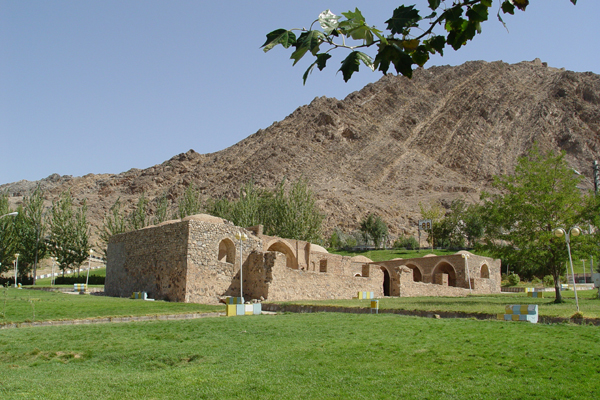

- Location of Kuhbanan County in Kerman province (top left, yellow)

- Location of Kerman province in Iran
- Coordinates: 31°17′N 56°12′E
- Country: Iran
- Province: Kerman
- Capital: Kuhbanan
- Districts: Central, Toghrol ol Jerd

Population (2016)
  - Total: 21,205
- Time zone: UTC+3:30 (IRST)

Kuhbanan County (Persian: شهرستان کوهبنان) is in Kerman province, Iran. Its capital is the city of Kuhbanan.

== History ==
After the 2006 National Census, Shaab Jereh Rural District was separated from the county to join Zarand County.

== Demographics ==
=== Population ===
At the time of the 2006 census, the county's population was 24,465 in 6,348 households. The following census in 2011 counted 21,721 people in 6,271 households. The 2016 census measured the population of the county as 21,205 in 6,413 households.

=== Administrative divisions ===
Kuhbanan County's population history and administrative structure over three consecutive censuses are shown in the following table.

Kuhbanan County Population
Administrative Divisions	2006	2011	2016
Central District	14,535	15,492	15,287
Javar RD	2,783	2,514	2,385
Khorramdasht RD	1,640	1,885	2,141
Kuhbanan (city)	10,112	11,093	10,761
Toghrol ol Jerd District	9,930	6,229	5,893
Shaab Jereh RD (Note: Transferred to Zarand County)	2,227		
Toghrol ol Jerd RD	1,200	674	1,350
Kianshahr (city)	6,503	5,555	4,543
Total	24,465	21,721	21,205
RD = Rural District

== See also ==
Media related to Kuhbanan County at Wikimedia Commons
