= Cheshmeh Sefid =

Cheshmeh Sefid or Chashmeh Sefid or Chashmeh Safid or Cheshmeh-ye Sefid or Cheshmehsefid (Persian: چشمه سفيد) may refer to:

== Fars Province ==
- Cheshmeh Sefid, Sepidan, a village in Sepidan County
- Cheshmeh Sefid, Hamaijan, a village in Sepidan County

== Kermanshah Province ==
- Cheshmeh Sefid, Dalahu, a village in Dalahu County
- Cheshmeh Sefid-e Sofla, Kermanshah, a village in Dalahu County
- Cheshmeh Sefid, Javanrud, a village in Javanrud County
- Baskeleh-ye Cheshmeh Sefid, a village in Gilan-e Gharb County County
- Cheshmeh Sefid-e Rutavand, a village in Gilan-e Gharb County County
- Cheshmeh Sefid-e Usin, a village in Gilan-e Gharb County County
- Cheshmeh Sefid, Mahidasht, a village in Kermanshah County
- Cheshmeh Sefid-e Aqabeygi, a village in Kermanshah County
- Cheshmeh Sefid, Ravansar, a village in Ravansar County
- Cheshmeh Sefid, Sarpol-e Zahab, a village in Sarpol-e Zahab County
- Cheshmeh Sefid, Sonqor, a village in Sonqor County

== Kurdistan Province ==
- Cheshmeh Sefid, Kurdistan, a village in Bijar County

== Lorestan Province ==
- Cheshmeh Sefid, Darb-e Gonbad, Lorestan Province
- Cheshmeh Sefid, Tarhan, Lorestan Province
- Cheshmeh Sefid-e Olya, Lorestan Province
- Cheshmeh Sefid-e Sofla, Lorestan

== Markazi Province ==
- Cheshmeh Sefid, Markazi

== Semnan Province ==
- Cheshmeh Sefid, Shahrud, Shahrud County, Semnan Province
- Cheshmeh Sefid, Meyami, Meyami County, Semnan Province
