= Murderaz =

Murderaz or Mur Deraz or Mowr Deraz (Persian: موردراز) may refer to various places in Iran:

- Mowr Deraz, Kavar, Fars Province
- Murderaz, Sepidan, Fars Province
- Mur Deraz, Dishmok, Kohgiluyeh County, Kohgiluyeh and Boyer-Ahmad Province
- Murderaz-e Olya, Kohgiluyeh and Boyer-Ahmad Province
- Murderaz-e Rahbar, Kohgiluyeh and Boyer-Ahmad Province
- Murderaz-e Sofla, Kohgiluyeh and Boyer-Ahmad Province
- Murderaz-e Vosta, Kohgiluyeh and Boyer-Ahmad Province
