= Saran, Iran =

Saran (Persian: ساران) in Iran may refer to:

- Saran, East Azerbaijan, a village in East Azerbaijan Province, Iran
- Saran-e Bala, a village in Fars Province, Iran
- Saran-e Pain, a village in Fars Province, Iran
- Saran, Hormozgan, a village in Hormozgan Province, Iran
- Saran, Kerman, a village in Kerman Province, Iran
- Saran, Kohgiluyeh and Boyer-Ahmad, a village in Kohgiluyeh and Boyer-Ahmad Province, Iran
- Saran-e Bala, Lorestan, a village in Lorestan Province, Iran
- Saran-e Pain, Lorestan, a village in Lorestan Province, Iran
- Saran, alternate name of Sari Kuchakeh, a village in Lorestan Province, Iran
- Saran, alternate name of Sagharan-e Olya, a village in Qazvin Province, Iran
- Saran, Kohgiluyeh and Boyer-Ahmad
- Saran, Mazandaran
- Saran, West Azerbaijan
