= Bahr Ghan =

Village in Fars province, Iran

Bahr Ghan Persian: بهرغان
- Village
- Location within Iran
- Coordinates: 30°12′48″N 52°01′05″E
- Country: Iran
- Province: Fars
- County: Sepidan
- District: Central
- Rural District: Shesh Pir

Population (2016)
  - Total: 3,167
- Time zone: UTC+3:30 (IRST)

Bahr Ghan (Persian: بهرغان) (Note: Also romanized as Bahr Ghān; also known as Bahr Khān, Barghān, Barqūn, Berghān, and Berghūn) is a village in, and the capital of, Shesh Pir Rural District of the Central District of Sepidan County, Fars province, Iran. It was the capital of Khafri Rural District until its capital was transferred to the village of Jowz-e Kangari.

== Demographics ==
=== Population ===
At the time of the 2006 National Census, the village's population was 1,651 in 392 households, when it was in Hamaijan District. The following census in 2011 counted 2,834 people in 776 households, by which time the rural district had been transferred to the Central District. The 2016 census measured the population of the village as 3,167 people in 901 households.
