= Benugir =

Benugir بنوگير
- Village
- Location within Iran
- Coordinates: 30°16′30″N 51°56′14″E
- Country: Iran
- Province: Fars
- County: Sepidan
- Bakhsh: Central
- Rural District: Khafri

Population (2006)
  - Total: 60
- Time zone: UTC+3:30 (IRST)
  - Summer (DST): UTC+4:30 (IRDT)

Benugir (Persian: بنوگير, also Romanized as Benūgīr) is a village in Khafri Rural District, in the Central District of Sepidan County, Fars province, Iran. At the 2006 census, its population was 60, in 19 families.
