= Shir Baba =

Shir Baba شيربابا
- Village
- Location within Iran
- Coordinates: 30°11′02″N 52°02′10″E
- Country: Iran
- Province: Fars
- County: Sepidan
- Bakhsh: Hamaijan
- Rural District: Shesh Pir

Population (2006)
  - Total: 257
- Time zone: UTC+3:30 (IRST)
  - Summer (DST): UTC+4:30 (IRDT)

Shir Baba (Persian: شيربابا, also Romanized as Shīr Bābā) is a village in Shesh Pir Rural District, Hamaijan District, Sepidan County, Fars province, Iran. At the 2006 census, its population was 257, in 67 families.
