= Gardan Kalat =

Gardan Kalat گردن كلات
- Village
- Location within Iran
- Coordinates: 30°12′27″N 51°55′42″E
- Country: Iran
- Province: Fars
- County: Sepidan
- Bakhsh: Central
- Rural District: Khafri

Population (2006)
  - Total: 132
- Time zone: UTC+3:30 (IRST)
  - Summer (DST): UTC+4:30 (IRDT)

Gardan Kalat (Persian: گردن كلات, also Romanized as Gardan Kalāt and Gardankalāt) is a village in Khafri Rural District, in the Central District of Sepidan County, Fars province, Iran. At the 2006 census, its population was 132, in 32 families.
