= Qaleh-ye Abbasabad, Fars =

Neighborhood in Fars province, Iran

Qaleh-ye Abbasabad Persian: قلعه عباس آباد
- Neighborhood
- Location within Iran
- Coordinates: 30°07′45″N 52°04′39″E
- Country: Iran
- Province: Fars
- County: Sepidan
- District: Hamaijan
- City: Hamashahr

Population (2006)
  - Total: 113
- Time zone: UTC+3:30 (IRST)

Qaleh-ye Abbasabad (Persian: قلعه عباس آباد) (Note: Also romanized as Qal‘eh-ye ‘Abbāsābād; also known as ‘Abbāsābād and Qal‘eh ‘Abbāsī) is a neighborhood in the city of Hamashahr in Hamaijan District of Sepidan County, Fars province, Iran.

== Demographics ==
=== Population ===
At the time of the 2006 National Census, Qaleh-ye Abbasabad's population was 113 in 29 households, when it was a village in Hamaijan Rural District.

After the census, the villages of Damqanat, Deh Bid, Dehpagah, Qaleh-ye Abbasabad, and Qaleh-ye Tiskhani merged to form the new city of Hamashahr.
