= Chal Anjaki =

Chal Anjaki چال انجکی
- Village
- Country: Iran
- Province: Fars
- County: Sepidan
- Bakhsh: Central
- Rural District: Khafri

Population (2006)
  - Total: 55
- Time zone: UTC+3:30 (IRST)
  - Summer (DST): UTC+4:30 (IRDT)

Chal Anjaki (Persian: چال انجکی, also Romanized as Chāl Ānjakī) is a village in Khafri Rural District, in the Central District of Sepidan County, Fars province, Iran. At the 2006 census, its population was 55, in 12 families.
