= Qaleh-ye Sartoli =

Qaleh-ye Sartoli قلعه سرتلي
- Village
- Location within Iran
- Coordinates: 30°08′35″N 52°04′12″E
- Country: Iran
- Province: Fars
- County: Sepidan
- Bakhsh: Hamaijan
- Rural District: Hamaijan

Population (2006)
  - Total: 631
- Time zone: UTC+3:30 (IRST)
  - Summer (DST): UTC+4:30 (IRDT)

Qaleh-ye Sartoli (Persian: قلعه سرتلي, also Romanized as Qal‘eh-ye Sartolī; also known as Sartolī) is a village in Hamaijan Rural District, Hamaijan District, Sepidan County, Fars province, Iran. At the 2006 census, its population was 631, in 153 families.
