= Patal Rahimi =

Patal Rahimi پاتل رحيمي
- Village
- Country: Iran
- Province: Fars
- County: Sepidan
- Bakhsh: Central
- Rural District: Khafri

Population (2006)
  - Total: 83
- Time zone: UTC+3:30 (IRST)
  - Summer (DST): UTC+4:30 (IRDT)

Patal Rahimi (Persian: پاتل رحيمي, also Romanized as Pātal Raḩīmī) is a village in Khafri Rural District, in the Central District of Sepidan County, Fars province, Iran. At the 2006 census, its population was 83, in 21 families.
