= Azarbeyglu =

Azarbeyglu اذربيگلو
- Village
- Country: Iran
- Province: Fars
- County: Sepidan
- Bakhsh: Central
- Rural District: Khafri

Population (2006)
  - Total: 35
- Time zone: UTC+3:30 (IRST)
  - Summer (DST): UTC+4:30 (IRDT)

Azarbeyglu (Persian: اذربيگلو, also Romanized as Āz̄arbeyglū) is a village in Khafri Rural District, in the Central District of Sepidan County, Fars province, Iran. At the 2006 census, its population was 35, in 11 families.
