= Qaleh-ye Mashhadi Karim =

Village in Fars, Iran

Qaleh-ye Mashhadi Karim قلعه مشهدي كريم
- Village
- Location within Iran
- Coordinates: 30°09′22″N 52°04′04″E
- Country: Iran
- Province: Fars
- County: Sepidan
- Bakhsh: Hamaijan
- Rural District: Hamaijan

Population (2006)
  - Total: 84
- Time zone: UTC+3:30 (IRST)
  - Summer (DST): UTC+4:30 (IRDT)

Qaleh-ye Mashhadi Karim (Persian: قلعه مشهدي كريم, also Romanized as Qal‘eh-ye Mashhadī Karīm; also known as Qal‘eh-ye Karīm) is a village in Hamaijan Rural District, Hamaijan District, Sepidan County, Fars province, Iran. At the 2006 census, its population was 84, in 25 families.
