= Behesht Makan =

Behesht Makan بهشت مكان
- Village
- Location within Iran
- Coordinates: 30°23′58″N 52°04′52″E
- Country: Iran
- Province: Fars
- County: Sepidan
- Bakhsh: Hamaijan
- Rural District: Shesh Pir

Population (2006)
  - Total: 243
- Time zone: UTC+3:30 (IRST)
  - Summer (DST): UTC+4:30 (IRDT)

Behesht Makan (Persian: بهشت مكان, also Romanized as Behesht Makān; also known as Bashtakān) is a village in Shesh Pir Rural District, Hamaijan District, Sepidan County, Fars province, Iran. At the 2006 census, its population was 243, in 51 families.
