= Cheshmeh Baklu =

Cheshmeh Baklu چشمه بكلو
- Village
- Location within Iran
- Coordinates: 30°06′13″N 52°00′05″E
- Country: Iran
- Province: Fars
- County: Sepidan
- Bakhsh: Hamaijan
- Rural District: Sornabad

Population (2006)
  - Total: 135
- Time zone: UTC+3:30 (IRST)
  - Summer (DST): UTC+4:30 (IRDT)

Cheshmeh Baklu (Persian: چشمه بكلو, also Romanized as Cheshmeh Baklū; also known as Cheshmeh Baglū and Cheshmeh Bayglū) is a village in Sornabad Rural District, Hamaijan District, Sepidan County, Fars province, Iran. At the 2006 census, its population was 135, in 34 families.
