= Tall Gord =

Tall Gord تل گرد
- Village
- Location within Iran
- Coordinates: 30°07′38″N 52°00′46″E
- Country: Iran
- Province: Fars
- County: Sepidan
- Bakhsh: Hamaijan
- Rural District: Hamaijan

Population (2006)
  - Total: 90
- Time zone: UTC+3:30 (IRST)
  - Summer (DST): UTC+4:30 (IRDT)

Tall Gord (Persian: تل گرد; also known as Tall Kord) is a village in Hamaijan Rural District, Hamaijan District, Sepidan County, Fars province, Iran. At the 2006 census, its population was 90, in 22 families.
