= Bereshneh =

Village in Fars province, Iran

Bereshneh Persian: برشنه
- Village
- Location within Iran
- Coordinates: 30°12′17″N 52°02′20″E
- Country: Iran
- Province: Fars
- County: Sepidan
- District: Central
- Rural District: Shesh Pir

Population (2016)
  - Total: 3,196
- Time zone: UTC+3:30 (IRST)

Bereshneh (Persian: برشنه) (Note: Also known as Bereshteh and Birishneh) is a village in Shesh Pir Rural District of the Central District of Sepidan County, Fars province, Iran.

== Demographics ==
=== Population ===
At the time of the 2006 National Census, the village's population was 2,190 in 481 households, when it was in Hamaijan District. The following census in 2011 counted 2,799 people in 720 households, by which time the rural district had been transferred to the Central District. The 2016 census measured the population of the village as 3,196 people in 872 households. It was the most populous village in its rural district.
