= Cheshmeh Dozdan =

Cheshmeh Dozdan چشمه دزدان
- Village
- Location within Iran
- Coordinates: 30°03′48″N 51°57′24″E
- Country: Iran
- Province: Fars
- County: Sepidan
- Bakhsh: Hamaijan
- Rural District: Sornabad

Population (2006)
  - Total: 27
- Time zone: UTC+3:30 (IRST)
  - Summer (DST): UTC+4:30 (IRDT)

Cheshmeh Dozdan (Persian: چشمه دزدان, also Romanized as Cheshmeh Dozdān and Chashmeh-e Dozdān) is a village in Sornabad Rural District, Hamaijan District, Sepidan County, Fars province, Iran. At the 2006 census, its population was 27, in 6 families.
