= Nivar (disambiguation) =

Nívar is a municipality in the province of Granada, Spain.

Nivar may also refer to:

- Nivar-e Olya, a village in Iran
- Nivar-e Sofla, a village in Iran
- Cyclone Nivar, a tropical cyclone
- Nivar (surname), a surname
