= Damqanat =

Neighborhood in Fars province, Iran

Damqanat Persian: دم قنات
- Neighborhood
- Location within Iran
- Coordinates: 30°05′49″N 52°05′28″E
- Country: Iran
- Province: Fars
- County: Sepidan
- District: Hamaijan
- City: Hamashahr

Population (2006)
  - Total: 628
- Time zone: UTC+3:30 (IRST)

Damqanat (Persian: دم قنات) (Note: Also romanized as Damqanāt) is a neighborhood in the city of Hamashahr in Hamaijan District of Sepidan County, Fars province, Iran.

== Demographics ==
=== Population ===
At the time of the 2006 National Census, Damqanat's population was 628 in 150 households, when it was a village in Hamaijan Rural District.

After the census, the villages of Damqanat, Deh Bid, Dehpagah, Qaleh-ye Abbasabad, and Qaleh-ye Tiskhani merged to form the new city of Hamashahr.
