= Rah Shahi =

Rah Shahi راه شاهی
- Village
- Location within Iran
- Coordinates: 30°15′19″N 51°57′44″E
- Country: Iran
- Province: Fars
- County: Sepidan
- Bakhsh: Central
- Rural District: Khafri

Population (2006)
  - Total: 79
- Time zone: UTC+3:30 (IRST)
  - Summer (DST): UTC+4:30 (IRDT)

Rah Shahi (Persian: راه شاهی, also Romanized as Rāh Shāhī; also known as Rāh-e Shāh) is a village in Khafri Rural District, in the Central District of Sepidan County, Fars province, Iran. At the 2006 census, its population was 79, in 21 families.
