= Ardeshiri =

Ardeshiri (Persian: اردشيري) may refer to:

- Ardeshiri-ye Olya
- Ardeshiri-ye Sofla
- Ardeshiri-ye Vosta
