= Bankastan =

Bankastan بنكستان
- Village
- Location within Iran
- Coordinates: 30°11′06″N 52°00′05″E
- Country: Iran
- Province: Fars
- County: Sepidan
- Bakhsh: Central
- Rural District: Khafri

Population (2006)
  - Total: 69
- Time zone: UTC+3:30 (IRST)
  - Summer (DST): UTC+4:30 (IRDT)

Bankastan (Persian: بنكستان, also Romanized as Bankastān; also known as Bangastān) is a village in Khafri Rural District, in the Central District of Sepidan County, Fars province, Iran. At the 2006 census, its population was 69, in 15 families.
