= Eshkeri =

Eshkeri اشكري
- Village
- Location within Iran
- Coordinates: 30°15′56″N 51°55′19″E
- Country: Iran
- Province: Fars
- County: Sepidan
- Bakhsh: Central
- Rural District: Khafri

Population (2006)
  - Total: 16
- Time zone: UTC+3:30 (IRST)
  - Summer (DST): UTC+4:30 (IRDT)

Eshkeri (Persian: اشكري, also Romanized as Eshkerī) is a village in Khafri Rural District, in the Central District of Sepidan County, Fars province, Iran. At the 2006 census, its population was 16, in 4 families.
