= Qaleh-ye Shahpur Khani =

Qaleh-ye Shahpur Khani قلعه شاهپورخاني
- Village
- Location within Iran
- Coordinates: 30°09′33″N 52°04′04″E
- Country: Iran
- Province: Fars
- County: Sepidan
- Bakhsh: Hamaijan
- Rural District: Hamaijan

Population (2006)
  - Total: 19
- Time zone: UTC+3:30 (IRST)
  - Summer (DST): UTC+4:30 (IRDT)

Qaleh-ye Shahpur Khani (Persian: قلعه شاهپورخاني, also Romanized as Qal‘eh-ye Shāhpūr Khānī; also known as Qal‘eh-ye 'Alī Jahāngīrī and Qal‘eh-ye Shāhpūr) is a village in Hamaijan Rural District, Hamaijan District, Sepidan County, Fars province, Iran. At the 2006 census, its population was 19, in 5 families.
