= Pol Khoda Afarin =

Pol Khoda Afarin پل خداافرين
- Village
- Country: Iran
- Province: Fars
- County: Sepidan
- Bakhsh: Hamaijan
- Rural District: Sornabad

Population (2006)
  - Total: 24
- Time zone: UTC+3:30 (IRST)
  - Summer (DST): UTC+4:30 (IRDT)

Pol Khoda Afarin (Persian: پل خداافرين, also Romanized as Pol Khodā Āfarīn) is a village in Sornabad Rural District, Hamaijan District, Sepidan County, Fars province, Iran. At the 2006 census, its population was 24, in 7 families.
