= Cheshmeh Talkhu =

Cheshmeh Talkhu چشمه تلخو
- Village
- Location within Iran
- Coordinates: 29°56′08″N 52°06′06″E
- Country: Iran
- Province: Fars
- County: Sepidan
- Bakhsh: Hamaijan
- Rural District: Hamaijan

Population (2006)
  - Total: 334
- Time zone: UTC+3:30 (IRST)
  - Summer (DST): UTC+4:30 (IRDT)

Cheshmeh Talkhu (Persian: چشمه تلخو, also Romanized as Cheshmeh Talkhū and Cheshmeh-ye Talkhū) is a village in Hamaijan Rural District, Hamaijan District, Sepidan County, Fars province, Iran. At the 2006 census, its population was 334, in 76 families.
