= Shesh Pir =

Shesh Pir شش پير
- Village
- Location within Iran
- Coordinates: 30°13′12″N 52°03′36″E
- Country: Iran
- Province: Fars
- County: Sepidan
- Bakhsh: Hamaijan
- Rural District: Shesh Pir

Population (2006)
  - Total: 33
- Time zone: UTC+3:30 (IRST)
  - Summer (DST): UTC+4:30 (IRDT)

Shesh Pir (Persian: شش پير, also Romanized as Shesh Pīr) is a village in Shesh Pir Rural District, Hamaijan District, Sepidan County, Fars province, Iran. At the 2006 census, its population was 33, in 9 families.
