= Qaleh-ye Tiskhani =

Neighborhood in Fars province, Iran

Qaleh-ye Tiskhani Persian: قلعه تیس خانی
- Neighborhood
- Location within Iran
- Coordinates: 30°06′55″N 52°05′38″E
- Country: Iran
- Province: Fars
- County: Sepidan
- District: Hamaijan
- City: Hamashahr

Population (2006)
  - Total: 336
- Time zone: UTC+3:30 (IRST)

Qaleh-ye Tiskhani (Persian: قلعه تیس خانی) (Note: Also romanized as Qal‘eh-ye Tīskhānī; also known as Qal‘eh-ye Ţīzkhānī, Tīskhānī, and Tīz Khānī) is a neighborhood in the city of Hamashahr in Hamaijan District of Sepidan County, Fars province, Iran.

== Demographics ==
=== Population ===
At the time of the 2006 National Census, Qaleh-ye Tiskhani's population was 336 in 74 households, when it was a village in Hamaijan Rural District.

After the census, the villages of Damqanat, Deh Bid, Dehpagah, Qaleh-ye Abbasabad, and Qaleh-ye Tiskhani merged to form the new city of Hamashahr.
