= Sahuk =

Sahuk سهوك
- Village
- Country: Iran
- Province: Fars
- County: Sepidan
- Bakhsh: Hamaijan
- Rural District: Sornabad

Population (2006)
  - Total: 35
- Time zone: UTC+3:30 (IRST)
  - Summer (DST): UTC+4:30 (IRDT)

Sahuk (Persian: سهوك, also Romanized as Sahūk) is a village in Sornabad Rural District, Hamaijan District, Sepidan County, Fars province, Iran. At the 2006 census, its population was 35, in 11 families.
