= Harayjan =

Harayjan هرايجان
- Village
- Location within Iran
- Coordinates: 29°59′55″N 52°03′13″E
- Country: Iran
- Province: Fars
- County: Sepidan
- Bakhsh: Hamaijan
- Rural District: Hamaijan

Population (2006)
  - Total: 1,250
- Time zone: UTC+3:30 (IRST)
  - Summer (DST): UTC+4:30 (IRDT)

Harayjan (Persian: هرايجان, also Romanized as Harāyjān; also known as Harāyjān-e Bālā and Harījān) is a village in Hamaijan Rural District, Hamaijan District, Sepidan County, Fars province, Iran. At the 2006 census, its population was 1,250, in 292 families.
