= Yek Dangeh =

Yek Dangeh يكدانگه
- Village
- Location within Iran
- Coordinates: 30°09′00″N 52°03′00″E
- Country: Iran
- Province: Fars
- County: Sepidan
- Bakhsh: Hamaijan
- Rural District: Hamaijan

Population (2006)
  - Total: 254
- Time zone: UTC+3:30 (IRST)
  - Summer (DST): UTC+4:30 (IRDT)

Yek Dangeh (Persian: يكدانگه, also Romanized as Yek Dāngeh) is a village in Hamaijan Rural District, Hamaijan District, Sepidan County, Fars province, Iran. At the 2006 census, its population was 254, in 56 families.
