= Sur-e Tahmasb =

Sur-e Tahmasb سورطهماسب
- Village
- Location within Iran
- Coordinates: 30°16′19″N 51°54′47″E
- Country: Iran
- Province: Fars
- County: Sepidan
- Bakhsh: Central
- Rural District: Khafri

Population (2006)
  - Total: 30
- Time zone: UTC+3:30 (IRST)
  - Summer (DST): UTC+4:30 (IRDT)

Sur-e Tahmasb (Persian: سورطهماسب, also Romanized as Sūr-e Ţahmāsb; also known as Shūr and Sūr) is a village in Khafri Rural District, in the Central District of Sepidan County, Fars province, Iran. At the 2006 census, its population was 30, in 7 families.
