= Vazak-e Moradi =

Vazak-e Moradi وزك مرادي
- Village
- Country: Iran
- Province: Fars
- County: Sepidan
- Bakhsh: Central
- Rural District: Khafri

Population (2006)
  - Total: 65
- Time zone: UTC+3:30 (IRST)
  - Summer (DST): UTC+4:30 (IRDT)

Vazak-e Moradi (Persian: وزك مرادي, also Romanized as Vazak-e Morādī) is a village in Khafri Rural District, in the Central District of Sepidan County, Fars province, Iran. At the 2006 census, its population was 65, in 22 families.
