= Dehlaleh =

Dehlaleh ده لاله
- Village
- Location within Iran
- Coordinates: 30°12′16″N 51°59′50″E
- Country: Iran
- Province: Fars
- County: Sepidan
- Bakhsh: Central
- Rural District: Khafri

Population (2006)
  - Total: 30
- Time zone: UTC+3:30 (IRST)
  - Summer (DST): UTC+4:30 (IRDT)

Dehlaleh (Persian: ده لاله, also Romanized as Dehlāleh and Deh-e Lāleh; also known as Deh Lāteh) is a village in Khafri Rural District, in the Central District of Sepidan County, Fars province, Iran. At the 2006 census, its population was 30, in 5 families.
