= Molla Balut =

Molla Balut ملابلوط
- Village
- Location within Iran
- Coordinates: 30°18′16″N 51°54′02″E
- Country: Iran
- Province: Fars
- County: Sepidan
- Bakhsh: Central
- Rural District: Khafri

Population (2006)
  - Total: 44
- Time zone: UTC+3:30 (IRST)
  - Summer (DST): UTC+4:30 (IRDT)

Molla Balut (Persian: ملابلوط, also Romanized as Mollā Balūţ; also known as Mollāy-ye Balūţ) is a village in Khafri Rural District, in the Central District of Sepidan County, Fars province, Iran. At the 2006 census, its population was 44, in 11 families.
