= Cheshmeh Zeytun =

Cheshmeh Zeytun چشمه زيتون
- Village
- Location within Iran
- Coordinates: 30°07′12″N 51°56′53″E
- Country: Iran
- Province: Fars
- County: Sepidan
- Bakhsh: Hamaijan
- Rural District: Sornabad

Population (2006)
  - Total: 85
- Time zone: UTC+3:30 (IRST)
  - Summer (DST): UTC+4:30 (IRDT)

Cheshmeh Zeytun (Persian: چشمه زيتون, also Romanized as Cheshmeh Zeytūn) is a village in Sornabad Rural District, Hamaijan District, Sepidan County, Fars province, Iran. At the 2006 census, its population was 85, in 26 families.
