= Chahar Mur =

Chahar Mur چهارمور
- Village
- Location within Iran
- Coordinates: 30°03′53″N 52°05′16″E
- Country: Iran
- Province: Fars
- County: Sepidan
- Bakhsh: Hamaijan
- Rural District: Hamaijan

Population (2006)
  - Total: 197
- Time zone: UTC+3:30 (IRST)
  - Summer (DST): UTC+4:30 (IRDT)

Chahar Mur (Persian: چهارمور, also Romanized as Chahār Mūr; also known as Chahār Mor and Ḩājjī Bānī) is a village in Hamaijan Rural District, Hamaijan District, Sepidan County, Fars province, Iran. At the 2006 census, its population was 197, in 43 families.
