= Qaleh-ye Mir Hasan =

Qaleh-ye Mir Hasan قلعه ميرحسن
- Village
- Country: Iran
- Province: Fars
- County: Sepidan
- Bakhsh: Hamaijan
- Rural District: Hamaijan

Population (2006)
  - Total: 123
- Time zone: UTC+3:30 (IRST)
  - Summer (DST): UTC+4:30 (IRDT)

Qaleh-ye Mir Hasan (Persian: قلعه ميرحسن, also Romanized as Qal‘eh-ye Mīr Ḩasan) is a village in Hamaijan Rural District, Hamaijan District, Sepidan County, Fars province, Iran. At the 2006 census, its population was 123, in 33 families.
