= Kharsor =

Kharsor خرسر
- Village
- Location within Iran
- Coordinates: 30°16′37″N 51°55′09″E
- Country: Iran
- Province: Fars
- County: Sepidan
- Bakhsh: Central
- Rural District: Khafri

Population (2006)
  - Total: 17
- Time zone: UTC+3:30 (IRST)
  - Summer (DST): UTC+4:30 (IRDT)

Kharsor (Persian: خرسر; also known as Ḩarsel and Kharsol) is a village in Khafri Rural District, in the Central District of Sepidan County, Fars province, Iran. At the 2006 census, its population was 17, in 5 families.
