= Kahkaran =

Kahkaran كهكران
- Village
- Location within Iran
- Coordinates: 30°22′09″N 52°04′12″E
- Country: Iran
- Province: Fars
- County: Sepidan
- Bakhsh: Hamaijan
- Rural District: Shesh Pir

Population (2006)
  - Total: 445
- Time zone: UTC+3:30 (IRST)
  - Summer (DST): UTC+4:30 (IRDT)

Kahkaran (Persian: كهكران, also Romanized as Kahkarān; also known as Kahkarūn) is a village in Shesh Pir Rural District, Hamaijan District, Sepidan County, Fars province, Iran. At the 2006 census, its population was 445, in 97 families.
