= Qaleh-ye Hajj Zu ol Faqar =

Qaleh-ye Hajj Zu ol Faqar قلعه حاج ذوالفقار
- Village
- Country: Iran
- Province: Fars
- County: Sepidan
- Bakhsh: Hamaijan
- Rural District: Hamaijan

Population (2006)
  - Total: 64
- Time zone: UTC+3:30 (IRST)
  - Summer (DST): UTC+4:30 (IRDT)

Qaleh-ye Hajj Zu ol Faqar (Persian: قلعه حاج ذوالفقار, also Romanized as Qal‘eh-ye Ḩājj Z̄ū ol Faqār) is a village in Hamaijan Rural District, Hamaijan District, Sepidan County, Fars province, Iran. At the 2006 census, its population was 64, in 12 families.
