= Deh Bid, Sepidan =

Neighborhood in Fars province, Iran

Deh Bid Persian: ده بيد
- Neighborhood
- Location within Iran
- Coordinates: 30°05′29″N 52°04′44″E
- Country: Iran
- Province: Fars
- County: Sepidan
- District: Hamaijan
- City: Hamashahr

Population (2006)
  - Total: 339
- Time zone: UTC+3:30 (IRST)

Deh Bid (Persian: ده بيد) (Note: Also romanized as Deh Bīd) is a neighborhood in the city of Hamashahr in Hamaijan District of Sepidan County, Fars province, Iran.

== Demographics ==
=== Population ===
At the time of the 2006 National Census, Deh Bid's population was 339 in 72 households, when it was a village in Hamaijan Rural District.

After the census, the villages of Damqanat, Deh Bid, Dehpagah, Qaleh-ye Abbasabad, and Qaleh-ye Tiskhani merged to form the new city of Hamashahr.
