= Darreh Susan =

Darreh Susan دره سوسن
- Village
- Location within Iran
- Coordinates: 30°04′08″N 52°01′42″E
- Country: Iran
- Province: Fars
- County: Sepidan
- Bakhsh: Hamaijan
- Rural District: Sornabad

Population (2006)
  - Total: 48
- Time zone: UTC+3:30 (IRST)
  - Summer (DST): UTC+4:30 (IRDT)

Darreh Susan (Persian: دره سوسن, also Romanized as Darreh Sūsan) is a village in Sornabad Rural District, Hamaijan District, Sepidan County, Fars province, Iran. At the 2006 census, its population was 48 in 12 families.
