= Rudshir =

Rud Shir or Rudshir (Persian: رودشير), also known as Rudshir-e Bala, may refer to:

- Rudshir-e Bid Mohammadi
- Rudshir-e Olya
- Rudshir-e Ziranbuh
