= Mowruzeh =

Mowruzeh موروزه
- Village
- Location within Iran
- Coordinates: 30°10′46″N 52°02′44″E
- Country: Iran
- Province: Fars
- County: Sepidan
- Bakhsh: Hamaijan
- Rural District: Shesh Pir

Population (2006)
  - Total: 184
- Time zone: UTC+3:30 (IRST)
  - Summer (DST): UTC+4:30 (IRDT)

Mowruzeh (Persian: موروزه, also Romanized as Mowrūzeh; also known as Mowrūz and Nowrūzeh) is a village in Shesh Pir Rural District, Hamaijan District, Sepidan County, Fars province, Iran. At the 2006 census, its population was 184, in 47 families.
