= Sarqanat =

Sarqanat or Sar Qanat (Persian: سرقنات) may refer to:

- Sarqanat, Bushehr
- Sarqanat, Hamaijan, Sepidan County, Fars Province
- Sar Qanat, Sornabad, Sepidan County, Fars Province
- Sar Qanat-e Qobad Chenar, Kohgiluyeh and Boyer-Ahmad Province
