= Bergaki =

Bergaki برگكي
- Village
- Location within Iran
- Coordinates: 30°08′33″N 51°52′43″E
- Country: Iran
- Province: Fars
- County: Sepidan
- Bakhsh: Hamaijan
- Rural District: Sornabad

Population (2006)
  - Total: 73
- Time zone: UTC+3:30 (IRST)
  - Summer (DST): UTC+4:30 (IRDT)

Bergaki (Persian: برگكي, also Romanized as Bergakī and Bargakī; also known as Barkakī) is a village in Sornabad Rural District, Hamaijan District, Sepidan County, Fars province, Iran. At the 2006 census, its population was 73, in 16 families.
