= Murderaz-e Bala =

Murderaz-e Bala (Persian: موردراز بالا) may refer to:

- Murderaz-e Bala, Fars
- Murderaz-e Bala, Kohgiluyeh and Boyer-Ahmad
