= Saran-e Pain =

Saran-e Pain ساران پائين
- Village
- Location within Iran
- Coordinates: 30°23′43″N 52°05′57″E
- Country: Iran
- Province: Fars
- County: Sepidan
- Bakhsh: Hamaijan
- Rural District: Shesh Pir

Population (2006)
  - Total: 710
- Time zone: UTC+3:30 (IRST)
  - Summer (DST): UTC+4:30 (IRDT)

Saran-e Pain (Persian: ساران پائين, also Romanized as Sārān-e Pā’īn; also known as Deh-e Dameshgaftī, Sārān, Sārān-e Seyyed Moḩammad, Sārān-e Soflá, and Sārān Soflá) is a village in Shesh Pir Rural District, Hamaijan District, Sepidan County, Fars province, Iran. At the 2006 census, its population was 710, in 147 families.
