= Cheshmeh Sefid-e Sofla =

Cheshmeh Sefid-e Sofla (Persian: چشمه سفيدسفلي) may refer to:

- Cheshmeh Sefid-e Sofla, Kermanshah
- Cheshmeh Sefid-e Sofla, Lorestan
