= Hamaijan =

Hamaijan (Persian: همایجان) may refer to:

- Hamaijan District
- Hamaijan Rural District
