= Khvosh Makan, Fars =

Khvosh Makan خوش مكان
- Village
- Location within Iran
- Coordinates: 30°13′22″N 51°58′32″E
- Country: Iran
- Province: Fars
- County: Sepidan
- Bakhsh: Central
- Rural District: Khafri

Population (2006)
  - Total: 114
- Time zone: UTC+3:30 (IRST)
  - Summer (DST): UTC+4:30 (IRDT)

Khvosh Makan (Persian: خوش مكان, also romanized as Khvosh Makān and Khowsh Makān; also known as Khosh Makān) is a village in Khafri Rural District, in the Central District of Sepidan County, Fars province, Iran. At the 2006 census, its population was 114, in 18 families.
