= Ardeshiri-ye Bala =

Ardeshiri-ye Bala اردشيري بالا
- Village
- Location within Iran
- Coordinates: 30°05′09″N 52°01′01″E
- Country: Iran
- Province: Fars
- County: Sepidan
- Bakhsh: Hamaijan
- Rural District: Sornabad

Population (2006)
  - Total: 343
- Time zone: UTC+3:30 (IRST)
  - Summer (DST): UTC+4:30 (IRDT)

Ardeshiri-ye Bala (Persian: اردشيري بالا, also Romanized as Ardeshīrī-ye Bālā; also known as Ardeshīrī-ye 'Olyā) is a village in Sornabad Rural District, Hamaijan District, Sepidan County, Fars province, Iran. At the 2006 census, its population was 343, in 79 families.
