= Sarqanat, Hamaijan =

Sarqanat سرقنات
- Village
- Location within Iran
- Coordinates: 29°58′47″N 52°03′01″E
- Country: Iran
- Province: Fars
- County: Sepidan
- Bakhsh: Hamaijan
- Rural District: Hamaijan

Population (2006)
  - Total: 18
- Time zone: UTC+3:30 (IRST)
  - Summer (DST): UTC+4:30 (IRDT)

Sarqanat (Persian: سرقنات, also Romanized as Sarqanāt; also known as Sar Qanāt-e Harījān) is a village in Hamaijan Rural District, Hamaijan District, Sepidan County, Fars province, Iran. At the 2006 census, its population was 18, in 6 families.
