= Dalin, Iran =

Village in Fars province, Iran

Dalin Persian: دالين
- Village
- Location within Iran
- Coordinates: 30°03′37″N 52°07′25″E
- Country: Iran
- Province: Fars
- County: Sepidan
- District: Hamaijan
- Rural District: Hamaijan

Population (2016)
  - Total: 2,403
- Time zone: UTC+3:30 (IRST)

Dalin (Persian: دالين) (Note: Also romanized as Dālīn; also known as Dehāli) is a village in Hamaijan Rural District of Hamaijan District, Sepidan County, Fars province, Iran.

== Demographics ==
=== Population ===
At the time of the 2006 National Census, the village's population was 2,256 in 509 households. The following census in 2011 counted 2,445 people in 258640households. The 2016 census measured the population of the village as 2,403 people in 684 households. It was the most populous village in its rural district.
