= Dehpagah, Sepidan =

Neighborhood in Fars province, Iran

Dehpagah Persian: ده پاگاه
- Neighborhood
- Location within Iran
- Coordinates: 30°07′00″N 52°04′48″E
- Country: Iran
- Province: Fars
- County: Sepidan
- District: Hamaijan
- Rural District: Hamaijan

Population (2006)
  - Total: 969
- Time zone: UTC+3:30 (IRST)

Dehpagah (Persian: ده پاگاه) (Note: Also romanized as Dehpāgāh; also known as Deh Pāgā, Dehpaka, and Paigāb) is a neighborhood in the city of Hamashahr in Hamaijan District of Sepidan County, Fars province, Iran.

== Demographics ==
=== Population ===
At the time of the 2006 National Census, Dehpagah's population was 969 in 224 households, when it was a village in Hamaijan Rural District.

After the census, the villages of Damqanat, Deh Bid, Dehpagah, Qaleh-ye Abbasabad, and Qaleh-ye Tiskhani merged to establish the new city of Hamashahr.
