= Mirzamohammadi-ye Pain =

Mirzamohammadi-ye Pain ميرزامحمدي پايين
- Village
- Location within Iran
- Coordinates: 30°05′12″N 51°57′30″E
- Country: Iran
- Province: Fars
- County: Sepidan
- Bakhsh: Hamaijan
- Rural District: Sornabad

Population (2006)
  - Total: 19
- Time zone: UTC+3:30 (IRST)
  - Summer (DST): UTC+4:30 (IRDT)

Mirzamohammadi-ye Pain (Persian: ميرزامحمدي پايين, also Romanized as Mīrzāmoḩammadī-ye Pā’īn; also known as Mīrzāmoḩammadī-ye Soflá) is a village in Sornabad Rural District, Hamaijan District, Sepidan County, Fars province, Iran. At the 2006 census, its population was 19, in 6 families.
