= Nivar, Iran =

Nivar (Persian: نيوار) in Iran may refer to:

- Nivar-e Olya
- Nivar-e Sofla
