= Bazmak-e Sofla =

Bazmak-e Sofla بزمكسفلي
- Village
- Location within Iran
- Coordinates: 30°08′00″N 51°56′00″E
- Country: Iran
- Province: Fars
- County: Sepidan
- Bakhsh: Hamaijan
- Rural District: Sornabad

Population (2006)
  - Total: 52
- Time zone: UTC+3:30 (IRST)
  - Summer (DST): UTC+4:30 (IRDT)

Bazmak-e Sofla (Persian: بزمكسفلي, also Romanized as Bazmak-e Soflá; also known as Bazmak-e Pā’īn) is a village in Sornabad Rural District, Hamaijan District, Sepidan County, Fars province, Iran. At the 2006 census, its population was 52, in 13 families.
