= Sar Qanat, Sornabad =

Sar Qanat سرقنات
- Village
- Location within Iran
- Coordinates: 30°07′13″N 51°56′56″E
- Country: Iran
- Province: Fars
- County: Sepidan
- Bakhsh: Hamaijan
- Rural District: Sornabad

Population (2006)
  - Total: 85
- Time zone: UTC+3:30 (IRST)
  - Summer (DST): UTC+4:30 (IRDT)

Sar Qanat (Persian: سرقنات, also Romanized as Sar Qanāt) is a village in Sornabad Rural District, Hamaijan District, Sepidan County, Fars province, Iran. At the 2006 census, its population was 85, in 23 families.
