= Farsijan, Fars =

Farsijan فارسيجان
- Village
- Location within Iran
- Coordinates: 30°12′44″N 51°59′09″E
- Country: Iran
- Province: Fars
- County: Sepidan
- Bakhsh: Central
- Rural District: Khafri

Population (2006)
  - Total: 247
- Time zone: UTC+3:30 (IRST)
  - Summer (DST): UTC+4:30 (IRDT)

Farsijan (Persian: فارسيجان, also Romanized as Fārsījān; also known as Pārsegūn) is a village in Khafri Rural District, in the Central District of Sepidan County, Fars province, Iran. At the 2006 census, its population was 247, in 44 families.
