= Cheshmeh Anjir, Sepidan =

Cheshmeh Anjir چشمه انجير
- Village
- Location within Iran
- Coordinates: 30°06′00″N 51°57′00″E
- Country: Iran
- Province: Fars
- County: Sepidan
- Bakhsh: Hamaijan
- Rural District: Shesh Pir

Population (2006)
  - Total: 9
- Time zone: UTC+3:30 (IRST)
  - Summer (DST): UTC+4:30 (IRDT)

Cheshmeh Anjir (Persian: چشمه انجير, also Romanized as Cheshmeh Anjīr; also known as Mollā Elyāsī) is a village in Shesh Pir Rural District, Hamaijan District, Sepidan County, Fars province, Iran. At the 2006 census, its population was 9, in 4 families.
