= Saran-e Bala =

Saran-e Bala ساران بالا
- Village
- Location within Iran
- Coordinates: 30°26′01″N 52°03′38″E
- Country: Iran
- Province: Fars
- County: Sepidan
- Bakhsh: Hamaijan
- Rural District: Shesh Pir

Population (2006)
  - Total: 353
- Time zone: UTC+3:30 (IRST)
  - Summer (DST): UTC+4:30 (IRDT)

Saran-e Bala (Persian: ساران بالا, also Romanized as Sārān-e Bālā; also known as Deh-e Bālā’ī, Sārān, Sārān-e 'Olyā, and Sarān 'Olyā) is a village in Shesh Pir Rural District, Hamaijan District, Sepidan County, Fars province, Iran. At the 2006 census, its population was 353, in 74 families.
