= Bazmak =

Bazmak or Bezmak (Persian: بزمك), also rendered as Bizmak, may refer to:

- Bazmak-e Olya
- Bazmak-e Sofla
