= Shah Mohammadi =

Village in Fars province, Iran

Shah Mohammadi Persian: شاه‌محمدی
- Village
- Location within Iran
- Coordinates: 30°05′51″N 51°57′22″E
- Country: Iran
- Province: Fars
- County: Sepidan
- District: Hamaijan
- Rural District: Sornabad

Population (2016)
  - Total: 120
- Time zone: UTC+3:30 (IRST)

Shah Mohammadi (Persian: شاه‌محمدی) (Note: Also romanized as Shāh Moḩammadī) is a village in, and the capital of, Sornabad Rural District of Hamaijan District, Sepidan County, Fars province, Iran.

== Demographics ==
=== Population ===
At the time of the 2006 National Census, the village's population was 89 in 17 households. The following census in 2011 counted 60 people in 17 households. The 2016 census measured the population of the village as 120 people in 34 households.
