= Jowz-e Kangari =

Village in Fars province, Iran

Jowz-e Kangari Persian: جوز كنگري
- Village
- Location within Iran
- Coordinates: 30°14′07″N 51°58′56″E
- Country: Iran
- Province: Fars
- County: Sepidan
- District: Central
- Rural District: Khafri

Population (2016)
  - Total: 440
- Time zone: UTC+3:30 (IRST)

Jowz-e Kangari (Persian: جوز كنگري) (Note: Also romanized as Jowz-e Kangarī; also known as Jowz-e Langarī) is a village in, and the capital of, Khafri Rural District of the Central District of Sepidan County, Fars province, Iran. The previous capital of the rural district was the village of Bahr Ghan.

== Demographics ==
=== Population ===
At the time of the 2006 National Census, the village's population was 337 in 78 households. The following census in 2011 counted 363 people in 106 households. The 2016 census measured the population of the village as 440 people in 123 households.
