= Rudshir-e Olya =

Rud Shir-e Olya رودشیر علیا
- Village
- Location within Iran
- Coordinates: 30°12′54″N 51°53′13″E
- Country: Iran
- Province: Fars
- County: Sepidan
- Bakhsh: Central
- Rural District: Khafri

Population (2006)
  - Total: 84
- Time zone: UTC+3:30 (IRST)
  - Summer (DST): UTC+4:30 (IRDT)

Rud Shir-e Olya (Persian: رودشیر علیا, also Romanized as Rūd Shīr-e 'Olyā; also known as Bīd Moḩammadī, Rūd Shīr-e Bālā, and Rūd Shīr-e Bīd Moḩammadī) is a village in Khafri Rural District, in the Central District of Sepidan County, Fars province, Iran. At the 2006 census, its population was 84, in 22 families.
