= Rikan =

Rikan or Reykan (Persian: ريكان) may refer to:

- Rikan, Fars
- Rikan, Sepidan, Fars Province
- Rikan, Hamadan
- Rikan, Semnan
- Rikan, West Azerbaijan
