= Cheshmeh Sefid, Hamaijan =

Cheshmeh Sefid چشمه سفيد
- Village
- Location within Iran
- Coordinates: 30°06′50″N 51°57′25″E
- Country: Iran
- Province: Fars
- County: Sepidan
- Bakhsh: Hamaijan
- Rural District: Sornabad

Population (2006)
  - Total: 179
- Time zone: UTC+3:30 (IRST)
  - Summer (DST): UTC+4:30 (IRDT)

Cheshmeh Sefid (Persian: چشمه سفيد, also Romanized as Cheshmeh Sefīd and Chashmeh Safīd) is a village in Sornabad Rural District, Hamaijan District, Sepidan County, Fars province, Iran. At the 2006 census, its population was 179, in 51 families.
