= Bazmak-e Olya =

Bazmak-e Olya بزمكعليا
- Village
- Location within Iran
- Coordinates: 30°07′48″N 51°56′07″E
- Country: Iran
- Province: Fars
- County: Sepidan
- Bakhsh: Hamaijan
- Rural District: Sornabad

Population (2006)
  - Total: 24
- Time zone: UTC+3:30 (IRST)
  - Summer (DST): UTC+4:30 (IRDT)

Bazmak-e Olya (Persian: بزمكعليا, also Romanized as Bazmak-e 'Olyā; also known as Bazmak, Bazmak-e Bālā, Bezmak, and Bīzmak) is a village in Sornabad Rural District, Hamaijan District, Sepidan County, Fars province, Iran. At the 2006 census, its population was 24, in 7 families.
