= Mirzamohammadi-ye Bala =

Mirzamohammadi-ye Bala ميرزامحمدي بالا
- Village
- Location within Iran
- Coordinates: 30°05′22″N 51°57′25″E
- Country: Iran
- Province: Fars
- County: Sepidan
- Bakhsh: Hamaijan
- Rural District: Sornabad

Population (2006)
  - Total: 45
- Time zone: UTC+3:30 (IRST)
  - Summer (DST): UTC+4:30 (IRDT)

Mirzamohammadi-ye Bala (Persian: ميرزامحمدي بالا, also Romanized as Mīrzāmoḩammadī-ye Bālā; also known as Mīrzāmoḩammadī-ye 'Olyā) is a village in Sornabad Rural District, Hamaijan District, Sepidan County, Fars province, Iran. At the 2006 census, its population was 45, in 10 families.
