= Ardeshiri-ye Vosta =

Ardeshiri-ye Vosta اردشيري وسطي
- Village
- Location within Iran
- Coordinates: 30°04′08″N 52°01′42″E
- Country: Iran
- Province: Fars
- County: Sepidan
- Bakhsh: Hamaijan
- Rural District: Sornabad

Population (2006)
  - Total: 76
- Time zone: UTC+3:30 (IRST)
  - Summer (DST): UTC+4:30 (IRDT)

Ardeshiri-ye Vosta (Persian: اردشيري وسطي, also Romanized as Ardeshīrī-ye Vosţá; also known as Ardeshīrī-ye Mīānī) is a village in Sornabad Rural District, Hamaijan District, Sepidan County, Fars province, Iran. At the 2006 census, its population was 76, in 18 families.
