= Bon Rud, Fars =

Bon Rud بن رود
- Village
- Location within Iran
- Coordinates: 30°20′15″N 51°51′59″E
- Country: Iran
- Province: Fars
- County: Sepidan
- Bakhsh: Central
- Rural District: Khafri

Population (2006)
  - Total: 18
- Time zone: UTC+3:30 (IRST)
  - Summer (DST): UTC+4:30 (IRDT)

Bon Rud (Persian: بن رود, also Romanized as Bon Rūd; also known as Bon Rūd-e Khalīfeh) is a village in Khafri Rural District, in the Central District of Sepidan County, Fars province, Iran. At the 2006 census, its population was 18, in 4 families.
