= Mirzamohammadi =

Mirzamohammadi (Persian: ميرزامحمدي) may refer to:

- Mirzamohammadi-ye Bala
- Mirzamohammadi-ye Pain
