= Cheshmeh Anjir =

Cheshmeh Anjir (Persian: چشمه انجير) may refer to:

- Cheshmeh Anjir, Sepidan, Fars Province
- Cheshmeh Anjir, Kohgiluyeh and Boyer-Ahmad
- Cheshmeh Anjir, Razavi Khorasan
