= Ardeshiri-ye Sofla =

Ardeshiri-ye Sofla اردشيري سفلي
- Village
- Location within Iran
- Coordinates: 30°03′42″N 52°01′45″E
- Country: Iran
- Province: Fars
- County: Sepidan
- Bakhsh: Hamaijan
- Rural District: Sornabad

Population (2006)
  - Total: 141
- Time zone: UTC+3:30 (IRST)
  - Summer (DST): UTC+4:30 (IRDT)

Ardeshiri-ye Sofla (Persian: اردشيري سفلي, also Romanized as Ardeshīrī-ye Soflá; also known as Ardeshīrī-ye Ḩoseynābād and Ardeshīrī-ye Pā’īn) is a village in Sornabad Rural District, Hamaijan District, Sepidan County, Fars province, Iran. At the 2006 census, its population was 141, in 35 families.
