= Shesh Pir (river) =

River in Iran

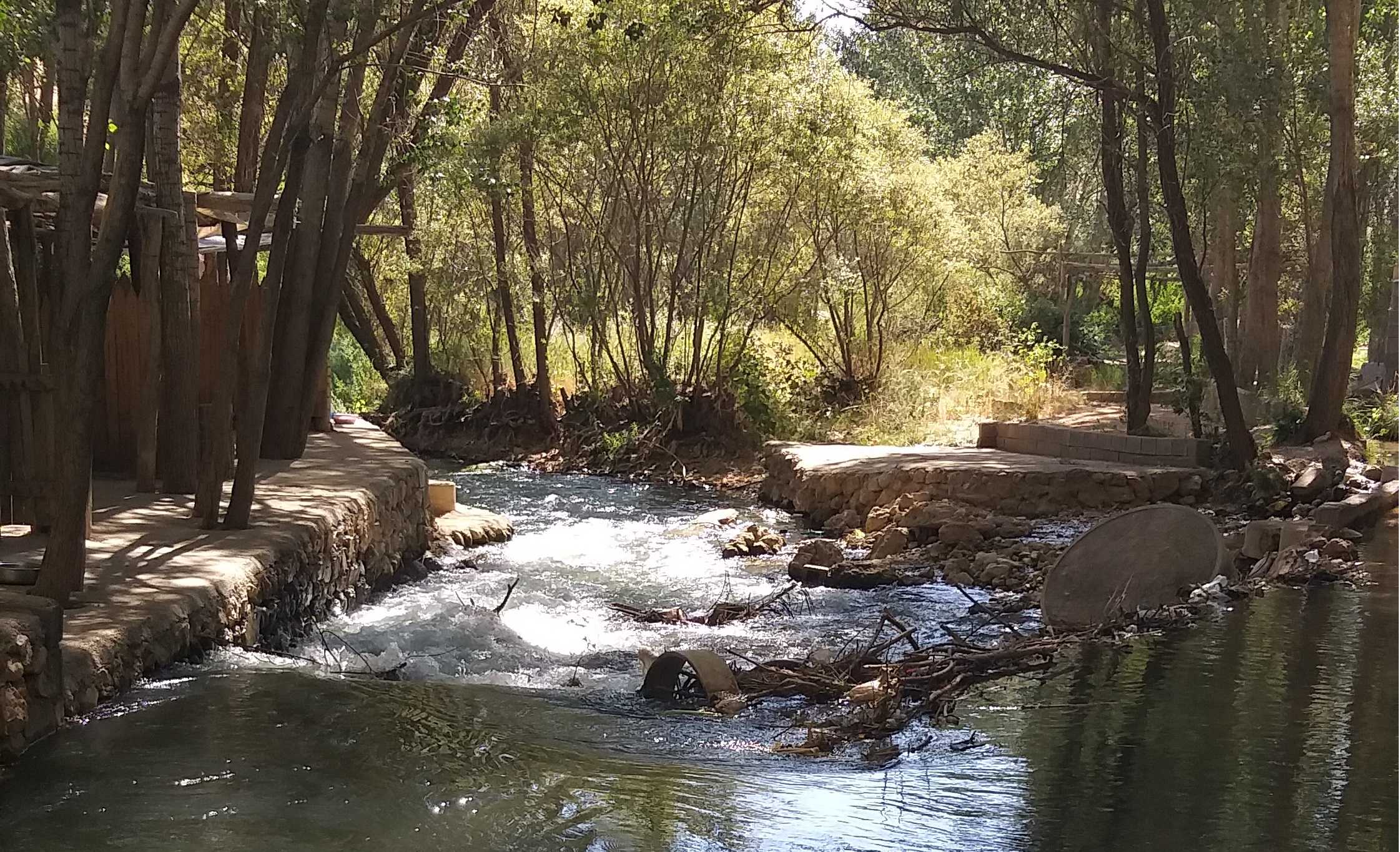
- Shesh pir river

Location
- Country: Iran
- State: Fars

Physical characteristics
- Width
  - average: 5m

Shashpir river (Persian: رودخانه شش‌پیر) is the name of one of the rivers in Fars province. The source of this river is Spring Shesh Pir, 15 km from Sepidan city.
