= Rashk-e Olya, Fars =

Village in Fars province, Iran

Rashk-e Olya Persian: راشك عليا
- Village
- Location within Iran
- Coordinates: 30°05′46″N 51°48′54″E
- Country: Iran
- Province: Fars
- County: Sepidan
- District: Hamaijan
- Rural District: Sornabad

Population (2016)
  - Total: 398
- Time zone: UTC+3:30 (IRST)

Rashk-e Olya (Persian: راشكعليا) (Note: Also romanized as Rāshk ‘Olyā and Rāshk-e ‘Olya; also known as Jahāneh, Rāshk-e Bālā, and Rāshk-e Balūţ) is a village in Sornabad Rural District of Hamaijan District, Sepidan County, Fars province, Iran.

== Demographics ==
=== Population ===
At the time of the 2006 National Census, the village's population was 742 in 181 households. The following census in 2011 counted 528 people in 172 households. The 2016 census measured the population of the village as 398 people in 140 households. It was the most populous village in its rural district.
