= Rahbar (disambiguation) =

Rahbar (رهبر, lit. 'Leader') is the common name in Persian for the Supreme Leader of Iran. It may also refer to:

== People ==
=== First name ===
- Rahbar Wahed Khan (born 1996), Bangladeshi footballer

== Other uses ==
- Rahbar (newspaper), Iranian newspaper
- Supreme Leader of Afghanistan

== See also ==
- Murderaz-e Rahbar, village in Kohgiluyeh and Boyer-Ahmad Province, Iran
