= Nivar-e Olya =

Nivar-e Olya نيوارعليا
- Village
- Location within Iran
- Coordinates: 30°07′50″N 51°53′35″E
- Country: Iran
- Province: Fars
- County: Sepidan
- Bakhsh: Hamaijan
- Rural District: Sornabad

Population (2006)
  - Total: 124
- Time zone: UTC+3:30 (IRST)
  - Summer (DST): UTC+4:30 (IRDT)

Nivar-e Olya (Persian: نيوارعليا, also Romanized as Nīvār-e 'Olyā; also known as Nīvār and Nīvār-e Bālā) is a village in Sornabad Rural District, Hamaijan District, Sepidan County, Fars province, Iran. At the 2006 census, its population was 124, in 32 families.
