= Khvosh Makan =

Khvosh Makan or Khowsh Makan (Persian: خوش مكان) may refer to:

- Khvosh Makan, Bushehr
- Khvosh Makan, Fars
