= Murderaz, Sepidan =

Murderaz موردراز
- Village
- Location within Iran
- Coordinates: 30°16′31″N 51°55′27″E
- Country: Iran
- Province: Fars
- County: Sepidan
- Bakhsh: Central
- Rural District: Khafri

Population (2006)
  - Total: 32
- Time zone: UTC+3:30 (IRST)
  - Summer (DST): UTC+4:30 (IRDT)

Murderaz (Persian: موردراز, also Romanized as Mūrderāz; also known as Mūrdāz-e Bozorg and Mūrderāz-e Bālā) is a village in Khafri Rural District, in the Central District of Sepidan County, Fars province, Iran. At the 2006 census, its population was 32, in 9 families.
