= Nivar-e Sofla =

Nivar-e Sofla نيوارسفلي
- Village
- Location within Iran
- Coordinates: 30°06′00″N 51°54′00″E
- Country: Iran
- Province: Fars
- County: Sepidan
- Bakhsh: Hamaijan
- Rural District: Sornabad

Population (2006)
  - Total: 17
- Time zone: UTC+3:30 (IRST)
  - Summer (DST): UTC+4:30 (IRDT)

Nivar-e Sofla (Persian: نيوارسفلي, also Romanized as Nīvār-e Soflá; also known as Nevārdūmen and Nīvār-e Pā’īn Jāvīd) is a village in Sornabad Rural District, Hamaijan District, Sepidan County, Fars province, Iran. At the 2006 census, its population was 17, in 5 families.
