= Farsi Jan =

Farsi Jan or Farsijan (Persian: فارسيجان) may refer to:

- Farsijan, Fars
- Farsi Jan, Markazi
