= Rigan, Fars =

Village in Fars province, Iran

Rigan Persian: ريگان
- Village
- Location within Iran
- Coordinates: 30°22′24″N 51°49′15″E
- Country: Iran
- Province: Fars
- County: Sepidan
- District: Central
- Rural District: Khafri

Population (2016)
  - Total: 749
- Time zone: UTC+3:30 (IRST)

Rigan (Persian: ريگان) (Note: Also romanized as Rīgān; also known as Rīkān) is a village in Khafri Rural District of the Central District of Sepidan County, Fars province, Iran.

== Demographics ==
=== Population ===
At the time of the 2006 National Census, the village's population was 738 in 185 households. The following census in 2011 counted 743 people in 235 households. The 2016 census measured the population of the village as 749 people in 242 households. It was the most populous village in its rural district.
