= Rashk-e Olya =

Rashk-e Olya or Rashk Olya (Persian: راشكعليا or رشک عليا), also known as Rashk-e Bala, may refer to:

- Rashk-e Olya, Fars (راشكعليا - Rāshk-e ‘Olyā)
- Rashk-e Olya, Kerman (رشک عليا - Rashk-e ‘Olyā)
