= Bon Rud =

Bon Rud (Persian: بن رود) may refer to:

- Bon Rud, Fars
- Bon Rud District, in Isfahan Province
