= Ardakan, Fars =

City in Fars province, Iran

Ardakan Persian: اردكان
- City
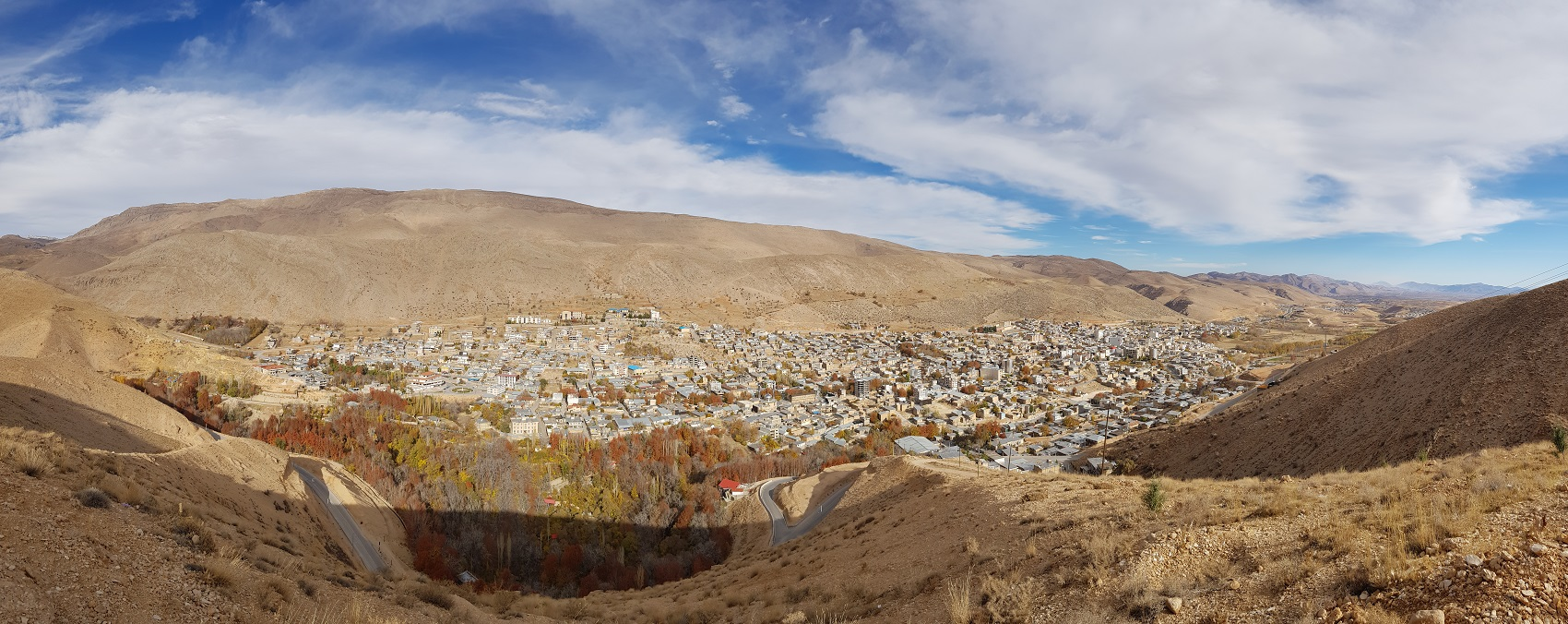
- Ardekan City panaromic view

- Location within Iran
- Coordinates: 30°15′34″N 51°59′07″E
- Country: Iran
- Province: Fars
- County: Sepidan
- District: Central

Population (2016)
  - Total: 14,633
- Time zone: UTC+3:30 (IRST)

Ardakan (Persian: اردكان) (Note: Also romanized as Ārdaḵān; also known as Artagan) is a city in the Central District of Sepidan County, Fars province, Iran, serving as capital of both the county and the district. Its name derives from the words arta (brave man) and kan or gan (place), or "place of brave men." The city is midway between Yasuj and Shiraz.

== Demographics ==
=== Population ===
At the time of the 2006 National Census, the city's population was 16,212 in 3,534 households. The following census in 2011 counted 16,661 people in 4,019 households. The 2016 census measured the population of the city as 14,633 people in 4,117 households.
