= Hamashahr =

City in Fars province, Iran

Hamashahr Persian: هماشهر
- City
- Location within Iran
- Coordinates: 30°06′56″N 52°04′57″E
- Country: Iran
- Province: Fars
- County: Sepidan
- District: Hamaijan

Population (2016)
  - Total: 3,852
- Time zone: UTC+3:30 (IRST)

Hamashahr (Persian: هماشهر) (Note: Formerly Dehpagah) is a city in, and the capital of, Hamaijan District of Sepidan County, Fars province, Iran. It also serves as the administrative center for Hamaijan Rural District. Hamahahr is the merger of the villages of Damqanat, Deh Bid, Dehpagah, Qaleh-ye Abbasabad, and Qaleh-ye Tiskhani.

== Demographics ==
=== Population ===
At the time of the 2006 National Census, the population (as the total of its constituent villages before the merger) was 2,385 in 549 households, when it was in Hamaijan Rural District. The following census in 2011 counted 3,233 people in 892 households, by which time the villages had merged to form the city of Hamashahr. The 2016 census measured the population of the city as 3,852 people in 1,129 households.
