= Murderaz-e Vosta =

Murderaz-e Vosta موردرازوسطي
- Village
- Location within Iran
- Coordinates: 30°36′47″N 51°33′26″E
- Country: Iran
- Province: Kohgiluyeh and Boyer-Ahmad
- County: Boyer-Ahmad
- Bakhsh: Central
- Rural District: Sarrud-e Jonubi

Population (2006)
  - Total: 244
- Time zone: UTC+3:30 (IRST)
  - Summer (DST): UTC+4:30 (IRDT)

Murderaz-e Vosta (Persian: موردرازوسطي, also Romanized as Mūrderāz-e Vosţá; also known as Mūrderāz-e Mīānī and Mūrderāz-e Vasaţ) is a village in Sarrud-e Jonubi Rural District, in the Central District of Boyer-Ahmad County, Kohgiluyeh and Boyer-Ahmad Province, Iran. At the 2006 census, its population was 244, in 44 families.
