= Cheshmeh Sefid-e Olya =

Cheshmeh Sefid-e Olya چشمه سفيدعليا
- Village
- Location within Iran
- Coordinates: 34°11′00″N 47°42′00″E
- Country: Iran
- Province: Lorestan
- County: Delfan
- Bakhsh: Kakavand
- Rural District: Kakavand-e Sharqi

Population (2006)
  - Total: 70
- Time zone: UTC+3:30 (IRST)
  - Summer (DST): UTC+4:30 (IRDT)

Cheshmeh Sefid-e Olya (Persian: چشمه سفيدعليا, also Romanized as Cheshmeh Sefīd-e 'Olyā) is a village in Kakavand-e Sharqi Rural District, Kakavand District, Delfan County, Lorestan province, Iran. At the 2006 census, its population was 70, in 14 families.
