= Saran, Kerman =

Saran سرن
- Village
- Location within Iran
- Coordinates: 26°58′28″N 58°05′01″E
- Country: Iran
- Province: Kerman
- County: Qaleh Ganj
- Bakhsh: Chah Dadkhoda
- Rural District: Marz

Population (2006)
  - Total: 44
- Time zone: UTC+3:30 (IRST)
  - Summer (DST): UTC+4:30 (IRDT)

Saran (Persian: سرن) is a village in Marz Rural District, Chah Dadkhoda District, Qaleh Ganj County, Kerman Province, Iran. At the time of the 2006 census, its population was 44 people who made up 15 families.
