= Deh Sefid, Sarpol-e Zahab =

Village in Kermanshah, Iran

Deh Sefid ده سفيد
- Village
- Location within Iran
- Coordinates: 34°37′37″N 45°59′03″E
- Country: Iran
- Province: Kermanshah
- County: Sarpol-e Zahab
- Bakhsh: Central
- Rural District: Posht Tang

Population (2006)
  - Total: 31
- Time zone: UTC+3:30 (IRST)
  - Summer (DST): UTC+4:30 (IRDT)

Deh Sefid (Persian: ده سفيد, also Romanized as Deh Sefīd; also known as Cheshmeh Sefīd) is a village in Posht Tang Rural District, in the Central District of Sarpol-e Zahab County, Kermanshah Province, Iran. At the 2006 census, its population was 31, in 6 families.
