= Saran-e Barshaku =

Saran-e Barshaku سران بارشكو
- Village
- Location within Iran
- Coordinates: 25°58′49″N 57°49′03″E
- Country: Iran
- Province: Hormozgan
- County: Jask
- Bakhsh: Central
- Rural District: Jask

Population (2006)
  - Total: 61
- Time zone: UTC+3:30 (IRST)
  - Summer (DST): UTC+4:30 (IRDT)

Saran-e Barshaku (Persian: سران بارشكو, also Romanized as Sarān Bārshakū; also known as Sarān) is a village in Jask Rural District, in the Central District of Jask County, Hormozgan Province, Iran. At the 2006 census, its population was 61, in 20 families.
