= Cheshmeh Sefid, Dalahu =

Cheshmeh Sefid چشمه سفيد
- Village
- Location within Iran
- Coordinates: 34°12′40″N 46°18′22″E
- Country: Iran
- Province: Kermanshah
- County: Dalahu
- Bakhsh: Central
- Rural District: Howmeh-ye Kerend

Population (2006)
  - Total: 432
- Time zone: UTC+3:30 (IRST)
  - Summer (DST): UTC+4:30 (IRDT)

Cheshmeh Sefid (Persian: چشمه سفيد, also Romanized as Cheshmeh Sefīd and Chashmeh Safid; also known as Cheshmeh Sefīd Rūtvand) is a village in Howmeh-ye Kerend Rural District, in the Central District of Dalahu County, Kermanshah Province, Iran. At the 2006 census, its population was 432, in 103 families.
