= Cheshmeh Sefid-e Shobankareh =

Cheshmeh Sefid-e Shobankareh چشمه سفيدشبانكاره
- Village
- Location within Iran
- Coordinates: 34°41′19″N 46°32′18″E
- Country: Iran
- Province: Kermanshah
- County: Ravansar
- Bakhsh: Central
- Rural District: Dowlatabad

Population (2006)
  - Total: 124
- Time zone: UTC+3:30 (IRST)
  - Summer (DST): UTC+4:30 (IRDT)

Cheshmeh Sefid-e Shobankareh (Persian: چشمه سفيدشبانكاره, also Romanized as Cheshmeh Sefīd-e Shobānkāreh; also known as Cheshmeh Sefīd) is a village in Dowlatabad Rural District, in the Central District of Ravansar County, Kermanshah Province, Iran. At the 2006 census, its population was 124, in 31 families.
