= Mur Deraz, Dishmok =

Village in Kohgiluyeh and Boyer-Ahmad, Iran

Mur Deraz موردراز
- Village
- Location within Iran
- Coordinates: 30°38′53″N 51°10′26″E
- Country: Iran
- Province: Kohgiluyeh and Boyer-Ahmad
- County: Kohgiluyeh
- Bakhsh: Dishmok
- Rural District: Bahmayi-ye Sarhadi-ye Sharqi

Population (2006)
  - Total: 145
- Time zone: UTC+3:30 (IRST)
  - Summer (DST): UTC+4:30 (IRDT)

Mur Deraz (Persian: موردراز, also Romanized as Mūr Derāz) is a village in Bahmayi-ye Sarhadi-ye Sharqi Rural District, Dishmok District, Kohgiluyeh County, Kohgiluyeh and Boyer-Ahmad Province, Iran. At the 2006 census, its population was 145, in 22 families.
