= Cheshmeh Sefid-e Aqabeygi =

Cheshmeh Sefid-e Aqabeygi چشمه سفيداقابيگي
- Village
- Location within Iran
- Coordinates: 34°24′03″N 46°31′59″E
- Country: Iran
- Province: Kermanshah
- County: Kermanshah
- Bakhsh: Kuzaran
- Rural District: Haft Ashiyan

Population (2006)
  - Total: 14
- Time zone: UTC+3:30 (IRST)
  - Summer (DST): UTC+4:30 (IRDT)

Cheshmeh Sefid-e Aqabeygi (Persian: چشمه سفيداقابيگي, also Romanized as Cheshmeh Sefīd-e Āqābeygī) is a village in Haft Ashiyan Rural District, Kuzaran District, Kermanshah County, Kermanshah Province, Iran. At the 2006 census, its population was 14, in 5 families.
