= Cheshmeh Anjir-e Firuzabad =

Village in Kohgiluyeh and Boyer-Ahmad, Iran

Cheshmeh Anjir-e Firuzabad چشمه انجيرفيروزاباد
- Village
- Location within Iran
- Coordinates: 30°44′28″N 51°26′26″E
- Country: Iran
- Province: Kohgiluyeh and Boyer-Ahmad
- County: Boyer-Ahmad
- Bakhsh: Central
- Rural District: Sarrud-e Jonubi

Population (2006)
  - Total: 204
- Time zone: UTC+3:30 (IRST)
  - Summer (DST): UTC+4:30 (IRDT)

Cheshmeh Anjir-e Firuzabad (Persian: چشمه انجيرفيروزاباد, also Romanized as Cheshmeh Anjīr-e Fīrūzābād; also known as Cheshmeh Anjīr and Cheshmeh Anjīrī) is a village in Sarrud-e Jonubi Rural District, in the Central District of Boyer-Ahmad County, Kohgiluyeh and Boyer-Ahmad Province, Iran. At the 2006 census, its population was 204, in 49 families.
