= Rikan, West Azerbaijan =

Rikan ريكان
- Village
- Location within Iran
- Coordinates: 37°31′06″N 45°11′12″E
- Country: Iran
- Province: West Azerbaijan
- County: Urmia
- Bakhsh: Central
- Rural District: Bakeshluchay

Population (2006)
  - Total: 125
- Time zone: UTC+3:30 (IRST)
  - Summer (DST): UTC+4:30 (IRDT)

Rikan (Persian: ريكان, also Romanized as Rīkān) is a village in Bakeshluchay Rural District, in the Central District of Urmia County, West Azerbaijan Province, Iran. At the 2006 census, its population was 125, in 40 families.
