= Cheshmeh Sefid, Markazi =

Cheshmeh Sefid چشمه سفيد
- Village
- Location within Iran
- Coordinates: 33°35′33″N 50°13′11″E
- Country: Iran
- Province: Markazi
- County: Khomeyn
- Bakhsh: Central
- Rural District: Galehzan

Population (2006)
  - Total: 29
- Time zone: UTC+3:30 (IRST)
  - Summer (DST): UTC+4:30 (IRDT)

Cheshmeh Sefid (Persian: چشمه سفيد, also Romanized as Cheshmeh Sefīd and Chashmeh Safīd) is a village in Galehzan Rural District, in the Central District of Khomeyn County, Markazi Province, Iran. At the 2006 census, its population was 29, in 11 families.
