= Cheshmeh Sefid, Javanrud =

Cheshmeh Sefid چشمه سفيد
- Village
- Location within Iran
- Coordinates: 34°44′24″N 46°28′30″E
- Country: Iran
- Province: Kermanshah
- County: Javanrud
- Bakhsh: Central
- Rural District: Palanganeh

Population (2006)
  - Total: 63
- Time zone: UTC+3:30 (IRST)
  - Summer (DST): UTC+4:30 (IRDT)

Cheshmeh Sefid (Persian: چشمه سفيد, Sorani Kurdish: کانی چەرمێ, also Romanized as Cheshmeh Sefīd; also known as Kānī Charmow) is a village in Palanganeh Rural District, in the Central District of Javanrud County, Kermanshah Province, Iran. At the 2006 census, its population was 63, in 14 families.
