= Sar Qanat-e Qobad Chenar =

Sar Qanat-e Qobad Chenar سرقنات قبادچنار
- Village
- Country: Iran
- Province: Kohgiluyeh and Boyer-Ahmad
- County: Dana
- Bakhsh: Kabgian
- Rural District: Chenar

Population (2006)
  - Total: 22
- Time zone: UTC+3:30 (IRST)
  - Summer (DST): UTC+4:30 (IRDT)

Sar Qanat-e Qobad Chenar (Persian: سرقنات قبادچنار, also Romanized as Sar Qanāt-e Qobād Chenār) is a village in Chenar Rural District, Kabgian District, Dana County, Kohgiluyeh and Boyer-Ahmad Province, Iran. At the 2006 census, its population was 22, in 5 families.
