= Cheshmeh Sefid, Sonqor =

Cheshmeh Sefid چشمه سفيد
- Village
- Location within Iran
- Coordinates: 35°00′12″N 47°27′24″E
- Country: Iran
- Province: Kermanshah
- County: Sonqor
- Bakhsh: Kolyai
- Rural District: Agahan

Population (2006)
  - Total: 245
- Time zone: UTC+3:30 (IRST)
  - Summer (DST): UTC+4:30 (IRDT)

Cheshmeh Sefid (Persian: چشمه سفيد, also Romanized as Cheshmeh Sefīd) is a village in Agahan Rural District, Kolyai District, Sonqor County, Kermanshah Province, Iran. At the 2006 census, its population was 245, in 51 families.
