= Nivar (surname) =

Nivar is a hispanic surname associated with the Dominican Republic. It originated as a shortening of the French surname Nivard. Notable people with the surname include:

- Indya Nivar (born 2004), American basketball player
- May Nivar, American politician
- Ramón Nivar (born 1980), Dominican-American baseball player
