= Cheshmeh Sefid-e Sofla, Kermanshah =

Cheshmeh Sefid-e Sofla چشمه سفيدسفلي
- Village
- Location within Iran
- Coordinates: 34°30′01″N 46°25′37″E
- Country: Iran
- Province: Kermanshah
- County: Dalahu
- Bakhsh: Gahvareh
- Rural District: Gurani

Population (2006)
  - Total: 69
- Time zone: UTC+3:30 (IRST)
  - Summer (DST): UTC+4:30 (IRDT)

Cheshmeh Sefid-e Sofla (Persian: چشمه سفيدسفلي, also Romanized as Cheshmeh Sefīd-e Soflá; also known as Cheshmeh Sefīd and Kānī Chamrow-e Tofangī) is a village in Gurani Rural District, Gahvareh District, Dalahu County, Kermanshah Province, Iran. At the 2006 census, its population was 69, in 19 families.
