= Murderaz-e Rahbar =

Murderaz-e Rahbar موردرازرهبر
- Village
- Location within Iran
- Coordinates: 30°36′55″N 51°33′39″E
- Country: Iran
- Province: Kohgiluyeh and Boyer-Ahmad
- County: Boyer-Ahmad
- Bakhsh: Central
- Rural District: Sarrud-e Jonubi

Population (2006)
  - Total: 390
- Time zone: UTC+3:30 (IRST)
  - Summer (DST): UTC+4:30 (IRDT)

Murderaz-e Rahbar (Persian: موردرازرهبر, also Romanized as Mūrderāz-e Rahbar) is a village in Sarrud-e Jonubi Rural District, in the Central District of Boyer-Ahmad County, Kohgiluyeh and Boyer-Ahmad Province, Iran. At the 2006 census, its population was 390, in 72 families.
