= Murderaz-e Olya =

Murderaz-e Olya موردرازعليا
- Village
- Location within Iran
- Coordinates: 30°36′29″N 51°33′14″E
- Country: Iran
- Province: Kohgiluyeh and Boyer-Ahmad
- County: Boyer-Ahmad
- Bakhsh: Central
- Rural District: Sarrud-e Jonubi

Population (2006)
  - Total: 353
- Time zone: UTC+3:30 (IRST)
  - Summer (DST): UTC+4:30 (IRDT)

Murderaz-e Olya (Persian: موردرازعليا, also Romanized as Mūrderāz-e ‘Olyā; also known as Mūrderāz-e Bālā) is a village in Sarrud-e Jonubi Rural District, in the Central District of Boyer-Ahmad County, Kohgiluyeh and Boyer-Ahmad Province, Iran. At the 2006 census, its population was 353, in 70 families.
