= Cheshmeh Sefid-e Sofla, Lorestan =

Cheshmeh Sefid-e Sofla چشمه سفيدسفلي
- Village
- Location within Iran
- Coordinates: 34°10′53″N 47°42′21″E
- Country: Iran
- Province: Lorestan
- County: Delfan
- Bakhsh: Kakavand
- Rural District: Kakavand-e Sharqi

Population (2006)
  - Total: 62
- Time zone: UTC+3:30 (IRST)
  - Summer (DST): UTC+4:30 (IRDT)

Cheshmeh Sefid-e Sofla (Persian: چشمه سفيدسفلي, also Romanized as Cheshmeh Sefīd-e Soflá; also known as Cheshmeh Sefīd) is a village in Kakavand-e Sharqi Rural District, Kakavand District, Delfan County, Lorestan Province, Iran. At the 2006 census, its population was 62, in 12 families.
