= Shesh Pir Rural District =

Rural district in Fars province, Iran

Shesh Pir Rural District Persian: دهستان شش پير
- Rural District
- Location within Iran
- Coordinates: 30°18′08″N 52°05′50″E
- Country: Iran
- Province: Fars
- County: Sepidan
- District: Central
- Capital: Bahr Ghan

Population (2016)
  - Total: 10,355
- Time zone: UTC+3:30 (IRST)

Shesh Pir Rural District (Persian: دهستان شش پير) is in the Central District of Sepidan County, Fars province, Iran. Its capital is the village of Bahr Ghan.

== Demographics ==
=== Population ===
At the time of the 2006 National Census, the rural district's population (as a part of Hamaijan District) was 8,197 in 1,799 households. There were 9,885 inhabitants in 2,584 households at the following census of 2011, by which time the rural district had been transferred to the Central District. The 2016 census measured the population of the rural district as 10,355 in 2,862 households. The most populous of its 26 villages was Bereshneh, with 3,196 people.
