= Sornabad Rural District =

Rural district in Fars province, Iran

Sornabad Rural District Persian: دهستان سرناباد
- Rural District
- Location within Iran
- Coordinates: 30°05′57″N 51°54′37″E
- Country: Iran
- Province: Fars
- County: Sepidan
- District: Hamaijan
- Capital: Shah Mohammadi

Population (2016)
  - Total: 2,289
- Time zone: UTC+3:30 (IRST)

Sornabad Rural District (Persian: دهستان سرناباد) is in Hamaijan District of Sepidan County, Fars province, Iran. Its capital is the village of Shah Mohammadi.

== Demographics ==
=== Population ===
At the time of the 2006 National Census, the rural district's population was 3,402 in 854 households. There were 2,636 inhabitants in 794 households at the following census of 2011. The 2016 census measured the population of the rural district as 2,289 in 748 households. The most populous of its 34 villages was Rashk-e Olya, with 398 people.
