= Hamaijan Rural District =

Rural district in Fars province, Iran

Hamaijan Rural District Persian: دهستان همایجان
- Rural District
- Location within Iran
- Coordinates: 30°03′38″N 52°09′26″E
- Country: Iran
- Province: Fars
- County: Sepidan
- District: Hamaijan
- Capital: Hamashahr

Population (2016)
  - Total: 12,073
- Time zone: UTC+3:30 (IRST)

Hamaijan Rural District (Persian: دهستان همایجان) is in Hamaijan District of Sepidan County, Fars province, Iran. It is administered from the city of Hamashahr. (Note: Formerly Dehpagah.)

== Demographics ==
=== Population ===
At the time of the 2006 National Census, the rural district's population was 15,449 in 3,546 households. There were 12,124 inhabitants in 3,324 households at the following census of 2011. The 2016 census measured the population of the rural district as 12,073 in 3,588 households. The most populous of its 59 villages was Dalin, with 2,403 people.
