= Khafri Rural District =

Rural district in Fars province, Iran

Khafri Rural District Persian: دهستان خفرئ
- Rural District
- Location within Iran
- Coordinates: 30°15′57″N 51°53′41″E
- Country: Iran
- Province: Fars
- County: Sepidan
- District: Central
- Capital: Jowz-e Kangari

Population (2016)
  - Total: 4,594
- Time zone: UTC+3:30 (IRST)

Khafri Rural District (Persian: دهستان خفرئ) is in the Central District of Sepidan County, Fars province, Iran. Its capital is the village of Jowz-e Kangari. The previous capital of the rural district was the village of Bahr Ghan.

== Demographics ==
=== Population ===
At the time of the 2006 National Census, the rural district's population was 4,035 in 976 households. There were 4,083 inhabitants in 1,177 households at the following census of 2011. The 2016 census measured the population of the rural district as 4,594 in 1,437 households. The most populous of its 77 villages was Rigan, with 749 people.
