= Central District (Sepidan County) =

District in Fars province, Iran

Central District (Sepidan County) Persian: بخش مرکزی شهرستان سپیدان
- District
- Location within Iran
- Coordinates: 30°20′38″N 51°59′44″E
- Country: Iran
- Province: Fars
- County: Sepidan
- Capital: Ardakan

Population (2016)
  - Total: 32,945
- Time zone: UTC+3:30 (IRST)

The Central District of Sepidan County (Persian: بخش مرکزی شهرستان سپیدان) is in Fars province, Iran. Its capital is the city of Ardakan.

== History ==
After the 2006 National Census, Shesh Pir Rural District was separated from Hamaijan District to join the Central District.

== Demographics ==
=== Population ===
At the time of the 2006 census, the district's population was 24,059 in 5,363 households. The following census in 2011 counted 34,478 people in 8,887 households. The 2016 census measured the population of the district as 32,945 inhabitants in 9,379 households.

=== Administrative divisions ===
Central District (Sepidan County) Population
Administrative Divisions	2006	2011	2016
Khafri RD	4,035	4,083	4,594
Komehr RD	3,812	3,849	3,363
Shesh Pir RD (Note: Transferred from Hamaijan District)		9,885	10,355
Ardakan (city)	16,212	16,661	14,633
Total	24,059	34,478	32,945
RD = Rural District
