= Hamaijan District =

District in Fars province, Iran

Hamaijan District Persian: بخش همایجان
- District
- Location within Iran
- Coordinates: 30°03′38″N 52°02′30″E
- Country: Iran
- Province: Fars
- County: Sepidan
- Capital: Hamashahr

Population (2016)
  - Total: 18,214
- Time zone: UTC+3:30 (IRST)

Hamaijan District (Persian: بخش همایجان) is in Sepidan County, Fars province, Iran. Its capital is the city of Hamashahr.

== History ==
After the 2006 National Census, five villages merged in the establishment of the new city of Hamashahr. Shesh Pir Rural District was separated from the district to join the Central District.

== Demographics ==
=== Population ===
At the time of the 2006 census, the district's population was 27,048 in 6,199 households. The following census in 2011 counted 17,993 people in 5,010 households. The 2016 census measured the population of the district as 18,214 inhabitants in 5,465 households.

=== Administrative divisions ===
Hamaijan District Population
Administrative Divisions	2006	2011	2016
Hamaijan RD	15,449	12,124	12,073
Shesh Pir RD (Note: Transferred to the Central District)	8,197		
Sornabad RD	3,402	2,636	2,289
Hamashahr (city) (Note: Merger of several villages)		3,233	3,852
Total	27,048	17,993	18,214
RD = Rural District
