= Sepidan County =

County in Fars province, Iran

Sepidan County Persian: شهرستان سپیدان
- County
- Location of Sepidan County in Fars province (top left, purple)

- Location of Fars province in Iran
- Coordinates: 30°15′N 52°00′E
- Country: Iran
- Province: Fars
- Capital: Ardakan
- Districts: Central, Hamaijan

Population (2016)
  - Total: 91,049
- Time zone: UTC+3:30 (IRST)

Sepidan County (Persian: شهرستان سپیدان) is in Fars province, Iran. Its capital is the city of Ardakan.

== History ==
After the 2006 National Census, five villages merged to form the new city of Hamashahr. Shesh Pir Rural District was separated from Hamaijan District to join the Central District.

In 2019, Beyza District was separated from the county in the establishment of Beyza County.

== Demographics ==
=== Population ===
At the time of the 2006 census, the county's population was 87,801 in 20,127 households. The following census in 2011 counted 89,398 people in 24,172 households. The 2016 census measured the population of the county as 91,049 in 26,381 households.

=== Administrative divisions ===
Sepidan County's population history and administrative structure over three consecutive censuses are shown in the following table.

Sepidan County Population
Administrative Divisions	2006	2011	2016
Central District	24,059	34,478	32,945
Khafri RD	4,035	4,083	4,594
Komehr RD	3,812	3,849	3,363
Shesh Pir RD		9,885	10,355
Ardakan (city)	16,212	16,661	14,633
Beyza District (Note: Transferred to Beyza County)	36,694	36,737	39,883
Banesh RD	9,718	9,422	9,397
Beyza RD	13,761	12,233	12,349
Kushk-e Hezar RD	9,622	10,848	10,885
Beyza (city) (Note: Formerly Harabal)	3,593	4,234	7,252
Hamaijan District	27,048	17,993	18,214
Hamaijan RD	15,449	12,124	12,073
Shesh Pir RD	8,197		
Sornabad RD	3,402	2,636	2,289
Hamashahr (city) (Note: Merger of several villages)		3,233	3,852
Total	87,801	89,398	91,049
RD = Rural District

== Handicrafts and tourism ==
Its cool summer climate, snow-covered mountains, and natural tourist attractions, such as Tizab Gorge, Chelleh-gah, and riding tracks and ski slopes, have helped boost the tourism industry.

== See also ==
Media related to Sepidan County at Wikimedia Commons
